= Marcia (given name) =

Marcia (/ˈmɑːrsiə, ˈmɑːrʃə/) is a female given name of Italian origin, derived from Latin meaning "dedicated to Mars". It is a female form of Marcius. Marcy/Marcie is a short form.

Notable people and characters with this name include:

== People ==
- Queen Marcia, legendary monarch of Britain
- Marcia (mistress of Commodus)
- Marcia (mother of Trajan)
- Marcia (wife of Cato)
- Marcia (vestal), Roman Vestal
- Marcia Anastasia Christoforides
- Marcia M. Anderson, first African-American woman to attain major general in the United States Army Reserve
- Marcia Andrade Braga, Brazilian military officer and peacekeeper
- Marcia Angell, American physician and author
- Marcia Ball, American blues singer and pianist
- Marcia Sherlon Barnwell, Vincentian politician
- Marcia Barrett, Jamaican-British singer
- Marcia Brown, American writer and illustrator
- Marcia Ciol, Brazilian-American statistician
- Marcia Clark, American prosecutor, author, television correspondent and television producer
- Marcia Cross, American actress
- Marcia Cruz-Correa, Puerto Rican physician-scientist and gastroenterologist
- Marcia Davenport, American writer and music critic
- Marcia Falkender, Baroness Falkender, British labor politician, civil servant and life peer
- Marcia Fudge, American attorney and politician
- Marcia Gallo, American historian and author
- Marcia Mitzman Gaven, American actress
- Marcia Griffiths, Jamaican reggae singer
- Marcia Gudereit, Canadian curler
- Marcia Hammon, American politician
- Marcia Gay Harden, American actress
- Marcia Herndon, American ethnomusicologist
- Marcia Hines, Australian singer
- Marcia Hutchinson, British writer and politician
- Marcia A. Karrow, American politician
- Marcia V. Keizs, Jamaican academic
- Marcia Kramer, American journalist
- Marcia Langton, Australian Aboriginal scholar and activist
- Marcia Layne, British playwright
- Marcia Lucas, American film editor
- Marcia Lee Macdonald, American photographer
- Marcia MacMillan, Canadian journalist
- Marcia Marcus, American painter
- Marcia Marx, American artist
- Marcia Mead, American architect
- Marcia Neave, Australian legal academic and judge
- Marcia Pankratz, American field hockey player
- Marcia Pelham, Countess of Yarborough, British countess
- Marcia Y. Riggs, American scholar, professor and theologian
- Marcia Rodd, American actress
- Marcia Strassman, American actress and singer
- Marcia Theophilo, Brazilian poet
- Marcia Trimble, American murder victim
- Marcia Wallace, American actress and comedian
- Marcia Yockey, American weather presenter

== Fictional characters ==
- Marcia Barton in the film The Creature Walks Among Us
- Marcia Brady of The Brady Bunch
- Marcia Overstrand of the book series Septimus Heap

== See also ==
- Marcia (gens)
- Marcie
- Márcio
- Marcius (disambiguation)
- Marcus (name), the male equivalent
- Marsha
- Marzia (given name)
