= History of The Simpsons =

The Simpson family from left to right: Bart, Santa's Little Helper (dog), Marge, Maggie, Homer, Lisa and Snowball II (cat).

The Simpsons is an American animated television sitcom starring the animated Simpson family, which was created by Matt Groening. He conceived of the characters in the lobby of James L. Brooks's office and named them after his own family members, substituting "Bart" for his own name. The family debuted as shorts on The Tracey Ullman Show on April 19, 1987. After a three-season run, the sketch was developed into a half-hour prime time show called The Simpsons, which debuted on December 17, 1989. The show was an early hit for Fox, becoming the first Fox series to land in the top 30 ratings in a season (1989–90).

The show was controversial from its beginning and that controversy has made the news many times. In the early seasons, some parents characterized Bart as a poor role model for children and several United States public schools banned The Simpsons merchandise and T-shirts. In January 1992, then-President George H. W. Bush made a speech during his re-election campaign in which he said: "We are going to keep on trying to strengthen the American family, to make American families a lot more like the Waltons and a lot less like the Simpsons." In 2002, the show was nearly sued by the Rio de Janeiro tourist board for creating an unreal image of the city on the show.

The Simpsons Movie, a feature-length film, was released in theaters worldwide in July of 2007. Previous attempts to create a film version of The Simpsons failed due to the lack of a script of appropriate length and production crew members. Eventually, producers Brooks, Groening, Al Jean, Mike Scully, and Richard Sakai began development of the film in 2001. They conceived numerous plot ideas, with Groening's being the one developed into a film. The script was re-written over a hundred times, and this creativity continued after animation had begun in 2006. The film was a box office success, and received overwhelmingly positive reviews.

The Simpsons eventually became the longest-running American sitcom, the longest-running American animated program, and in 2009 it surpassed Gunsmoke as the longest-running American primetime, scripted television series. Since its debut on December 17, 1989, the show has broadcast 816 episodes and its 37th season premiered on September 28, 2025.

== Background ==
Matt Groening grew up with an interest in cartooning from his father, Homer Groening, who drew one-page strips for magazines. After college in Oregon, Groening moved to Los Angeles to pursue a writing career, working a series of odd jobs upon arrival. In 1977, while employed at the record store Licorice Pizza during the rise of punk rock, he created a comic series titled Life in Hell. He distributed photocopies of the strip in the store's punk section, which gradually gained attention. Groening later joined the Los Angeles Reader, where Life in Hell became a regular feature in the paper's classifieds section. By the early 1980s, the strip had developed a cult following. Together with his then-partner Deborah Caplan, Groening began self-publishing collections of Life in Hell, which were later distributed nationally by Pantheon Books.

By the mid-1980s, producer James L. Brooks had established a distinguished career in both film and television. He had co-created The Mary Tyler Moore Show and Taxi, and by the beginning of the decade had transitioned into film, earning acclaim for comedies such as Terms of Endearment (1983). Producer Polly Platt gifted Brooks an original Life in Hell drawing by Groening, subtitled the "Los Angeles Way of death", which captured his attention with its irreverent tone. In 1985, Brooks invited Groening to a meeting at his office on the Paramount Pictures lot to discuss the possibility of working on a project, though it did not immediately produce a collaboration.

By 1986, Brooks had moved over to 20th Century Fox, and with its support founded his own production company, Gracie Films. At Fox, he helped The Tracey Ullman Show, a variety showcase starring the comedian for the studio's fledgling broadcast network. Ken Estin, who co-created the program, was also a fan of Groening and asked him to use his Life In Hell characters for small animated bumpers. Groening realized that adapting Life in Hell for animation would require relinquishing the publication rights to his life's work, and therefore declined the offer. Producer Richard Sakai then contacted Groening to ask if he had any other characters that Fox could potentially merchandise. In response, Groening sketched out a dysfunctional family concept that would become The Simpsons. He named the characters after his own family members, substituting "Bart" for his own name, adapting an anagram of the word "brat". Fox negotiated a deal which would prove extremely lucrative for Groening, in which he retained a large portion of revenue from merchandising. At the time, not many television programs had been licensed for merchandising, aside from M*A*S*H; the thinking on behalf of the studio, according to Estin, was that by giving Groening a bigger share of potential merchandising, they could pay him less upfront for the shorts.

Accounts differ regarding how quickly the characters were created. Then-Fox president Garth Ancier has stated that Groening designed the family at home and brought the drawings to Fox the following day, while animator Phil Roman recalls that Groening developed the characters during the drive to the studio. Groening himself has said that he conceived The Simpsons hurriedly while waiting in the lobby of Brooks's office before the pitch meeting—a version that is the most widely reported. Alternatively, Estin claimed that after Groening refused to surrender merchandising rights, he was dismissed from the project. Brooks and Sakai, however, remained open to any new concept Groening proposed, at which point he pitched them The Simpsons.

== The Tracey Ullman shorts (1987–1989) ==
The Simpson family as they first appeared in The Tracey Ullman Show.

The Tracey Ullman Show debuted in April 1987 on Fox, and became a critical darling, becoming the first show from the network to be nominated for an Emmy Award; the series ended up with 10 awards across 33 nominations over the course of its run. Appearing initially alongside cartoons by M. K. Brown, the Simpson family first appeared in short subjects on April 19, 1987, and were featured the first three seasons.

Several members of the cast of the program voiced the characters, which were recorded in a makeshift studio on the show's soundstage, and all of them reprised their roles in the eventual series. Dan Castellaneta and Julie Kavner voiced Homer and Marge; Castellaneta later added Abraham Simpson and Krusty the Clown across the shorts. Homer's voice in the shorts is a loose impression of Walter Matthau, whereas it became more robust and humorous on the half-hour show, allowing Homer to cover a fuller range of emotions. Nancy Cartwright and Yeardley Smith performed the voices of Bart Simpson and Lisa Simpson, respectively.

To animate the short segments, Brooks and his team selected Klasky Csupo, a small Hollywood animation studio that offered to produce the cartoons at low cost. Brooks had initially intended for the shorts to be rendered using basic line drawings, but Klasky Csupo provided full-color animation for the same price. The studio employed only three young animators—recent CalArts graduates Bill Kopp, Wes Archer, and David Silverman—who adapted Groening's scripts into animated form within a single week, handling layouts, animation, and inbetweening entirely by hand. Groening submitted only basic sketches to the animators, assuming that the figures would be refined during production. Instead, the animators largely traced his sketches directly, contributing to the crude appearance of the characters in the early shorts. Colorist Gyorgyi Peluce chose the characters’ distinctive yellow hue, while Silverman established standardized drawing rules, simplifying and streamlining the designs to ensure consistency.

During extended breaks on-set, the crew of the show began stringing the shorts together on tape to entertain the studio audience, which generated big laughs. As the shorts gained popularity, the staff of The Tracey Ullman Show reportedly began to view them as a distraction from the main program. Jay Kogen, one of the show’s writers who, along with Wallace Wolodarsky, helped form the series’ initial writing staff, argued that the shorts were the strongest part of the program. Tracey Ullman herself was said to have disliked the segments, allegedly remarking, "When are these horrible cartoons getting off my show?" Groening, for his part, requested that Ullman voice characters in the shorts, but was often told she was "too busy", according to one report. Nevertheless, Fox executives took notice of the shorts’ potential, and the concept of adapting the series to a half-hour format took shape.

Adapting the show into a half-hour format presented significant challenges. In the United States, there had not been a weekly primetime animated series aimed at adults in over twenty-five years, since The Flintstones. Brooks’ interest in developing the sitcom was partly sparked by David Silverman, who, at a Christmas party, drunkenly approached him and passionately suggested the idea, emphasizing the impact a primetime animated series could have on television animation, which had been in a creative lull. Both Groening and Brooks were supportive of the concept, but persuading studio chairman Barry Diller proved more difficult. Diller initially considered the project financially prohibitive—each short had an estimated budget of around $15,000, while a half-hour series of thirteen episodes ran into the millions. The Fox network was unsure if the show could sustain the audience's attention for the duration of an episode. and proposed doing three seven-minute shorts per episode and four specials until the audience adjusted, an approach Brooks rejected. According to Alan Siegel in Stupid TV, Be More Funny, ABC had at one point expressed interest in financing the series. Ultimately, Diller relented—partly out of concern that Brooks might take his talents to another network—and greenlit the show without requiring a pilot episode. Groening said his goal was to offer the audience an alternative to what he called "the mainstream trash".

== The Groening, Brooks, and Simon years (1989–1991) ==
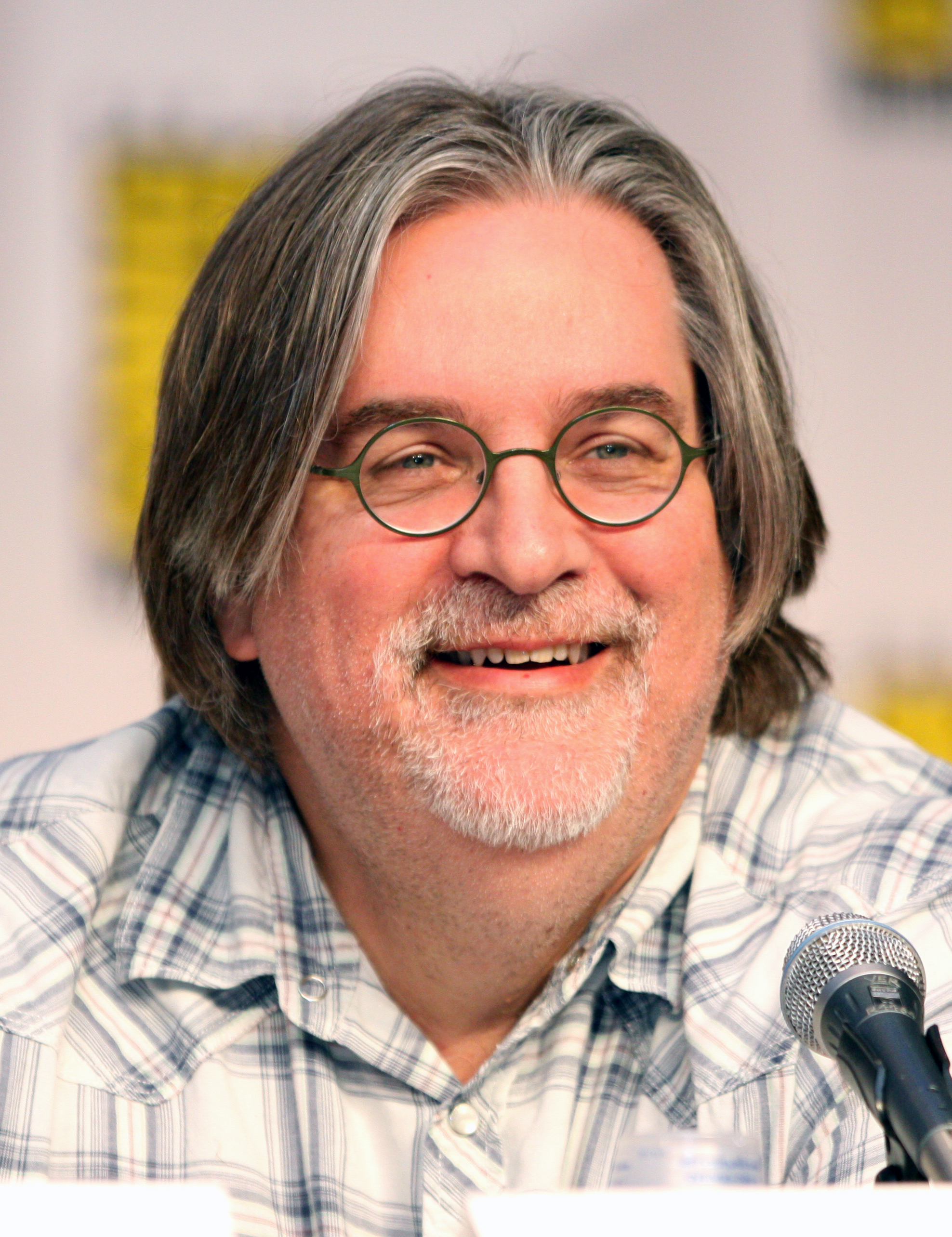
Matt Groening

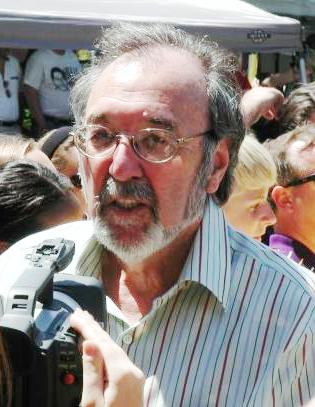
James L. Brooks

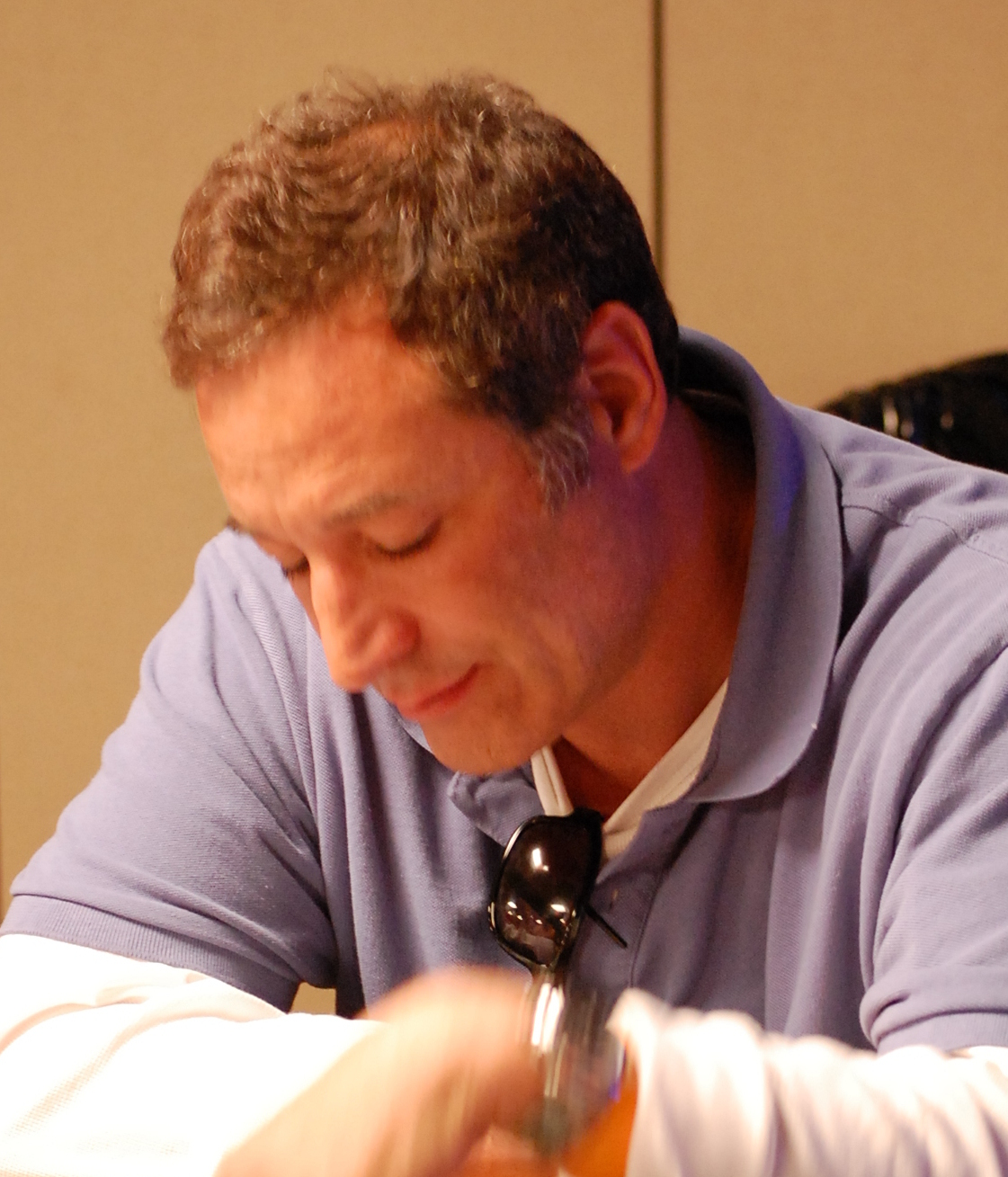
Sam Simon

The Simpsons entered production in 1988 and began assembling its creative staff. Brooks, occupied with his film career, was unable to oversee the series full-time, and Groening had no prior experience running a television show. To lead the project, Brooks hand-picked television veteran Sam Simon, a writer-producer with whom he had previously collaborated on programs such as Taxi, to serve as the series’ first showrunner. Simon also brought relevant animation experience, having worked in storyboards earlier in his career. Simon assembled and led the initial writing team, composed of writers known for their sharp comedic sensibilities: Al Jean, Mike Reiss, George Meyer, Jon Vitti, John Swartzwelder, Jeff Martin, Jay Kogen, and Wallace Wolodarsky. Simon has been credited as "developing [the show's] sensibility". Levine says he "brought a level of honesty to the characters" and made them "three-dimensional", adding that Simon's "comedy is all about character, not just a string of gags".

The show had genuine creative freedom: Brooks had negotiated a provision in the contract with the Fox network that prevented Fox from interfering with the show's content. Simon saw The Simpsons as a chance to solve what he did not like about Saturday-morning cartoon shows. He wanted all the actors in a room together, instead of reading their lines separated from each other. In addition to Castellaneta, Kavner, Cartwright and Smith, actors Harry Shearer and Hank Azaria were added to the show's cast. Due to the increased workload of the full-length episodes, animation production was subcontracted to South Korean animation studio AKOM. While character and background layout is done by the domestic studio, tweening, coloring and filming is done by the overseas studio.

Groening developed a lengthy opening sequence to cut down on the animation necessary for each episode, but devised two gags as compensation for the repeated material each week. In the first gag, the camera zooms in on Springfield Elementary School, where Bart can be seen writing a message on the chalkboard. This message, which changes from episode to episode, has become known as the "chalkboard gag". The other gag is known as a "couch gag", in which a twist of events occur when the family meets to sit on their couch and watch television. Groening, who had not paid much attention to television since childhood, was unaware that title sequences of such length were uncommon by that time. The theme, which plays over the sequence, was composed by Danny Elfman in 1989, after Groening approached him requesting a "retro-style" theme. The piece, which took two days to create, has been noted by Elfman as the most popular of his career.

The half-hour series premiered on December 17, 1989, with "Simpsons Roasting on an Open Fire". The series was originally set to debut in the fall of 1989 with the episode "Some Enchanted Evening", but the producers discovered that the animation was so appalling that 70 percent of the episode needed to be redone. At the time there were only a few choices for animation style; usually, they would follow the style of Disney, Warner Bros., or Hanna-Barbera. The producers wanted a realistic environment in which the characters and objects could not do anything that was not possible in the real world. They considered aborting the series if the next episode "Bart the Genius" turned out as bad, but it only suffered from easily fixable problems. The debut was moved to December, and "Simpsons Roasting on an Open Fire" became the first episode of the series. In some of the episodes of the first season, the characters act completely differently from in later seasons; Lisa, for example, is undisciplined and short-tempered, while Homer is the voice of reason; these roles are reversed in later episodes.

During the second season, The Simpsons aired the first Halloween special, "Treehouse of Horror". The annual series typically consist of four parts: an opening and Halloween-themed version of the credits, followed by three segments. These segments usually have a horror, science fiction or supernatural theme and quite often are parodies of films, novels, plays, television shows, Twilight Zone episodes, or old issues of EC Comics. Part of the attraction for the writers is that they are able to break the rules and include violence that would not make a regular episode. In some cases, the writers will have an idea that is too violent and far-fetched or too short for a normal episode, but can be used as a segment in the seasonal special. The first "Treehouse of Horror" episode was the first time that an alternate version of the theme airs over the end credits.

=== Bartmania and criticism ===
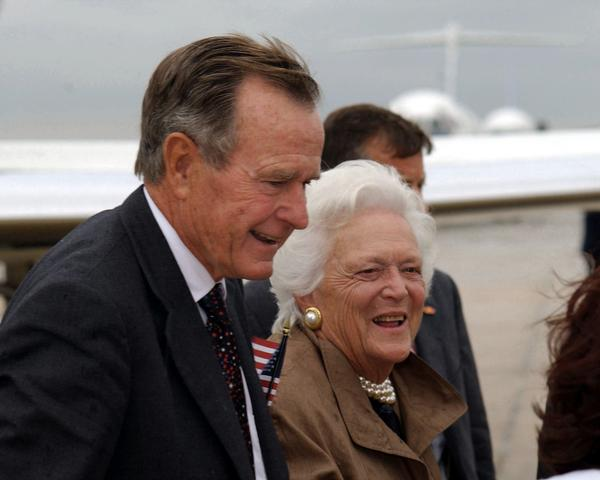
The show was criticized by several conservatives. Among those were President George H. W. Bush and First Lady Barbara Bush.

The show was controversial from its beginning. The rebellious lead character at the time, Bart, frequently received no punishment for his misbehavior, which led some parents to characterize him as a poor role model for children. Several US public schools banned The Simpsons merchandise and T-shirts, such as one featuring Bart and the caption "Underachiever ('And proud of it, man!')". In the season two opening episode "Bart Gets an 'F'", Bart fails four consecutive history exams and the school psychiatrist recommends that Bart repeat the fourth grade. Several critics thought that the episode "Bart Gets an 'F'" was a response to these controversies. However, Brooks denied that it was a response and added, "we're mindful of it. I do think it's important for us that Bart does badly in school. There are students like that. Besides, I'm very wary of television where everybody is supposed to be a role model. You don't run across that many role models in real life. Why should television be full of them?"

In the October 1, 1990, edition of People, First Lady Barbara Bush called The Simpsons "the dumbest thing [she] had ever seen" which led to the writers sending a letter to Bush posing as Marge Simpson. Bush immediately sent a reply in which she apologized. 16 months later, on January 27, 1992, then-President of the United States George H. W. Bush made a speech during his re-election campaign where he said, "We are going to keep on trying to strengthen the American family, to make American families a lot more like the Waltons and a lot less like the Simpsons." The writers decided that they wanted to respond by adding a response to the next broadcast of The Simpsons, which was a rerun of "Stark Raving Dad" on January 30. The broadcast included a new tongue-in-cheek opening where they watch Bush's speech. Bart replies, "Hey, we're just like the Waltons. We're praying for an end to the Depression, too". The criticism eventually led to the idea for the episode "Two Bad Neighbors", which has George and Barbara move into the house across the street from the Simpsons.

=== Competing with The Cosby Show ===
The Simpsons first season was the Fox network's first TV series to rank among a season's top 30 highest-rated shows. Due to its success, the Fox network decided to switch The Simpsons timeslots in hopes that it would result in higher ratings for the lead out shows. It would move from 8:00 PM on Sunday night to the same time on Thursday where it would compete with The Cosby Show, the number one show at the time. Many of the producers were against the move, as The Simpsons had been in the top 10 while airing on Sunday and they felt the move would destroy its ratings.

"Bart Gets an 'F'" was the first episode to air against The Cosby Show and averaged an 18.4 Nielsen rating and 29% of the audience. In the weeks ratings, it finished tied for eighth behind The Cosby Show which had an 18.5 rating. However, an estimated 33.6 million viewers watched the episode, making it the number one show in terms of actual viewers that week. At the time, it was the most watched episode in the history of the Fox Network and still remains the most watched episode in the history of The Simpsons. Ratings wise, new episodes of The Cosby Show beat The Simpsons every time during the second season and The Simpsons eventually fell out of the top 10. At the end of the season Cosby averaged as the fifth highest rated show on television while The Simpsons ranked 38th. It would not be until the third-season episode "Homer at the Bat" that The Simpsons would beat The Cosby Show in the ratings. The show remained in its Thursday timeslot until the sixth season, when it moved back to its original timeslot on Sundays.

=== Music release and "Do the Bartman" ===
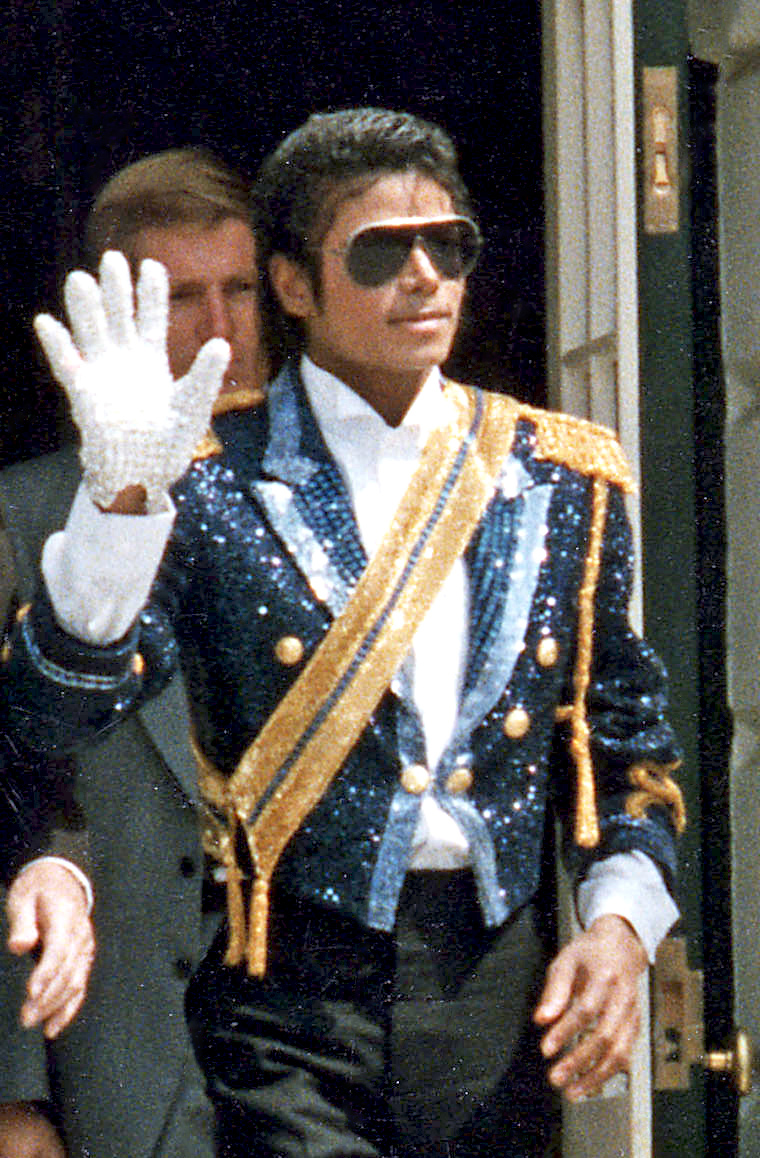
Michael Jackson co-wrote the single "Do the Bartman"

David Geffen, founder of Geffen Records, had the idea to record the album The Simpsons Sing the Blues based on The Simpsons, to be released in time for Christmas 1990. The writers wrote humorous lyrics for the actors to perform over blues and hip hop. The album faced great publicity before its release. One particular element that was highly publicized was Michael Jackson's involvement, which was denied around the time of the album's release. Early published reports attributed Jackson as the composer of "Do the Bartman", which Groening denied in a press release. However, Groening revealed in 1998 that "Do the Bartman" was actually co-written and co-produced by Jackson, but he could not receive credit for it because he was under contract to another record label. Jackson was a fan of The Simpsons, especially Bart, and had called the producers one night offering to write Bart a number one single and do a guest spot on the show, which is how "Do the Bartman" came about. Jackson eventually guest-starred in the episode "Stark Raving Dad".

The album The Simpsons Sing the Blues was certified triple platinum by the Recording Industry Association of America for sales of over 3 million copies. The producers followed up on the album with The Yellow Album in 1998, which featured original recordings by Prince, Linda Ronstadt, C+C Music Factory, and George Clinton of Funkadelic as well as the cast of The Simpsons. The soundtrack albums Songs in the Key of Springfield (1997), Go Simpsonic with The Simpsons (1999), The Simpsons Movie: The Music (2007), and The Simpsons: Testify (2007) were also released.

== The Jean and Reiss years (1991–1993) ==
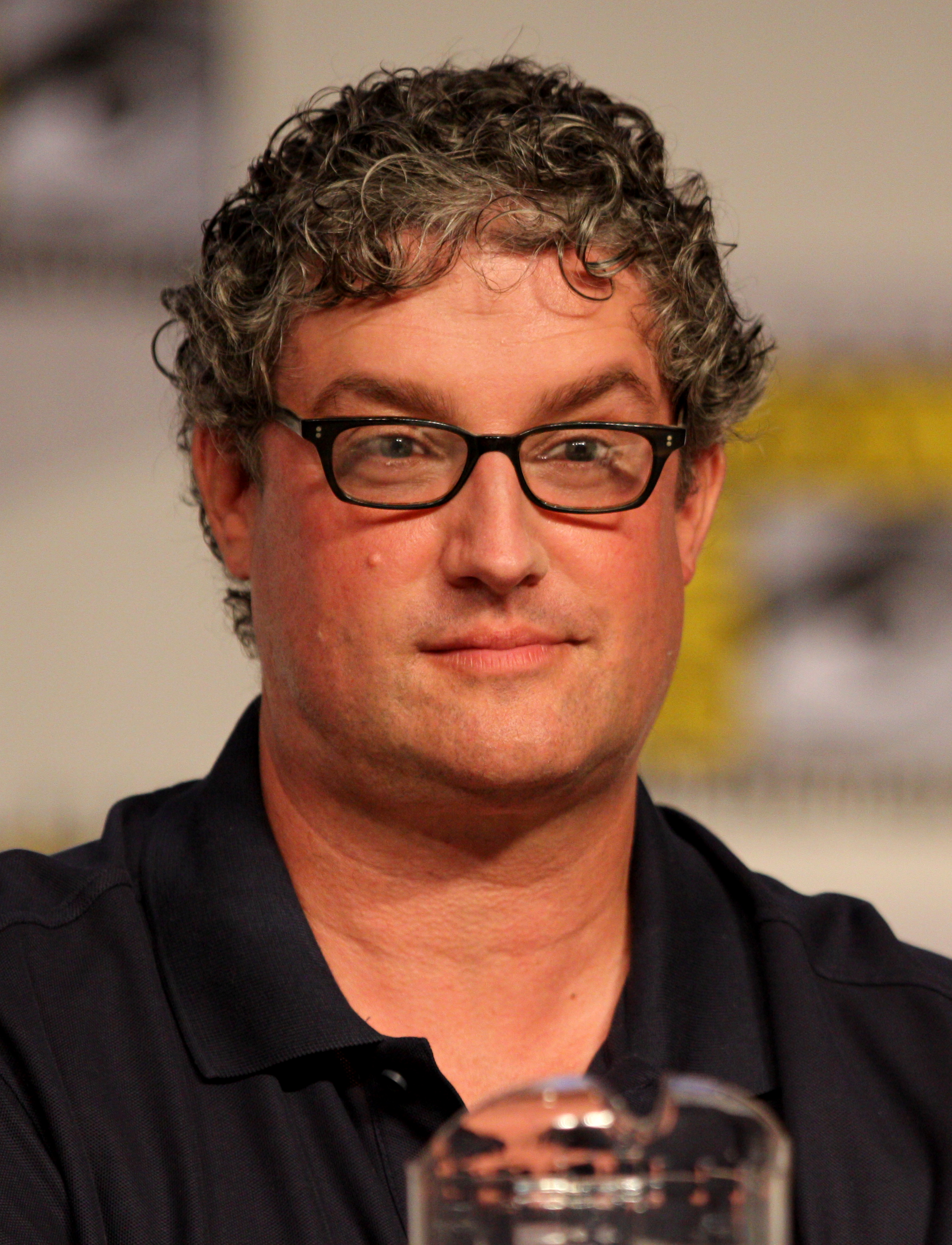
Al Jean

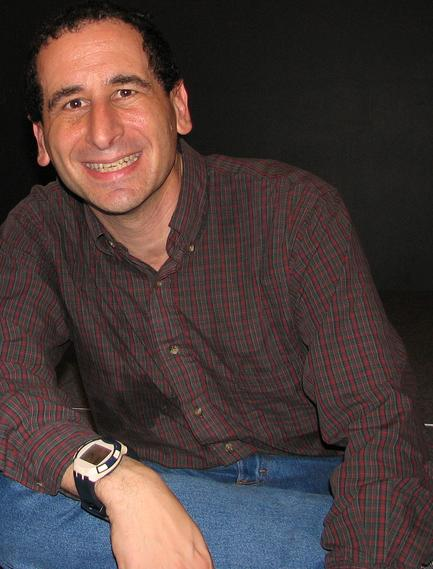
Mike Reiss

Although they initially worked well together, Simon and Groening's relationship became "very contentious" according to Groening. According to John Ortved's book The Simpsons: An Uncensored, Unauthorized History, Simon resented the media attention Groening received, particularly the praise for the show's writing; Simon felt that Groening's involvement was limited, and that he should have been the one receiving credit for the show. As well as Groening, Simon was often at odds with Brooks and production company Gracie Films and left the show in 1993. Before leaving, he negotiated a deal that saw him receive a share of the show's profits every year, and an executive producer credit despite not having worked on the show since. Al Jean and Mike Reiss, who had written for The Simpsons since the start of the show, took over as showrunners for the third season. Compared to being an executive producer, the showrunner position is more involved with the show and acts as head writer and manages the show's production for an entire season. As well as a turnover in the staff, The Simpsons moved the production of the animation from Klasky Csupo to Film Roman in season four.

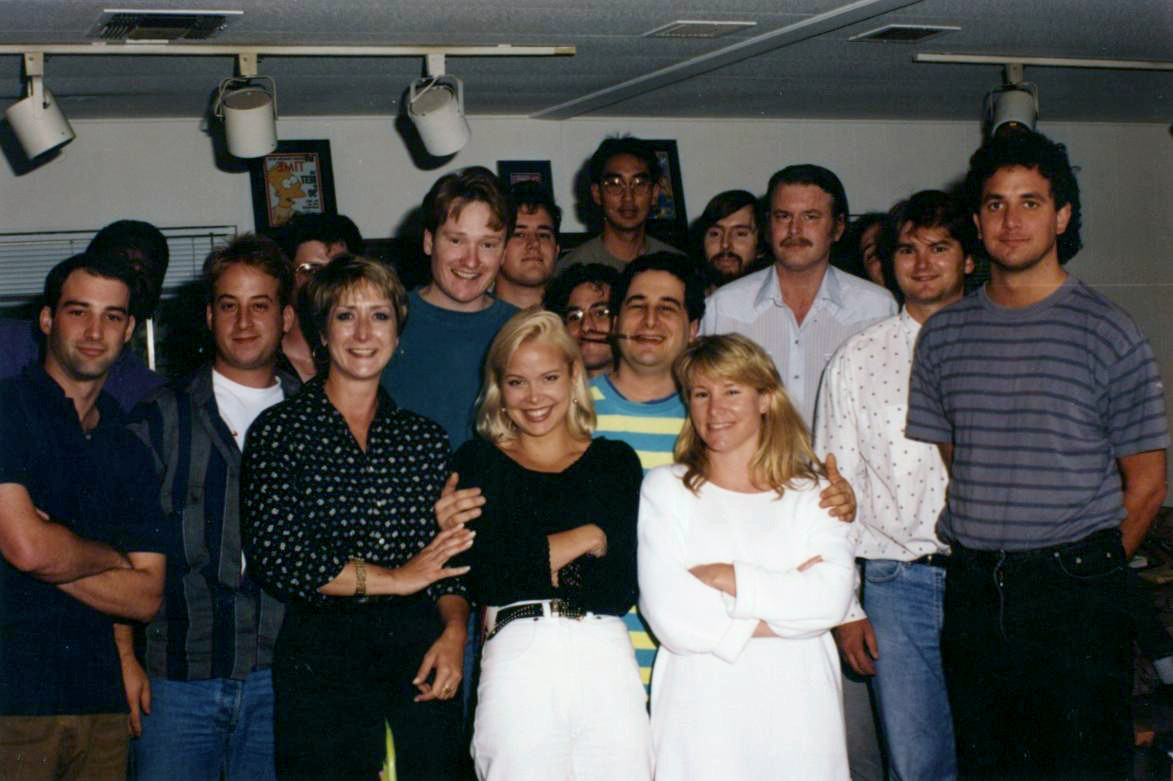
Part of the writing staff of The Simpsons in 1992

One of the earliest episodes of the fourth season was "A Streetcar Named Marge." The musical within the episode contains a controversial song about New Orleans, which describes the city as a "home of pirates, drunks and whores", among other things. Jeff Martin, the writer of the episode, had meant the song to be a parody of the opening number in Sweeney Todd: The Demon Barber of Fleet Street, which speaks of London in unflattering terms. A New Orleans critic viewed "A Streetcar Named Marge" and published the song lyrics in his newspaper before the episode aired. Many readers took the lyrics out of context, and New Orleans' Fox affiliate, WNOL, received about one hundred complaints on the day the episode aired. Several local radio stations also held on-air protests in response to the song. The Simpsons' producers rushed out an apologetic chalkboard gag for "Homer the Heretic", which aired the week after "A Streetcar Named Marge". It read, "I will not defame New Orleans".

Ullman filed a lawsuit in 1992, claiming that her show was the source of The Simpsons' success and therefore should receive a share of the show's profit. "I breast-fed those little devils," Ullman once said of The Simpsons. She wanted a share of The Simpsons' merchandising and gross profits and believed she was entitled to $2.5 million of Fox's estimated $50 million in 1992. The Fox network had paid her $58,000 in royalties for The Simpsons as well as $3 million for the 3½ seasons her show was on the air. Eventually the courts ruled in favor of the network.

== The Mirkin years (1993–1995) ==
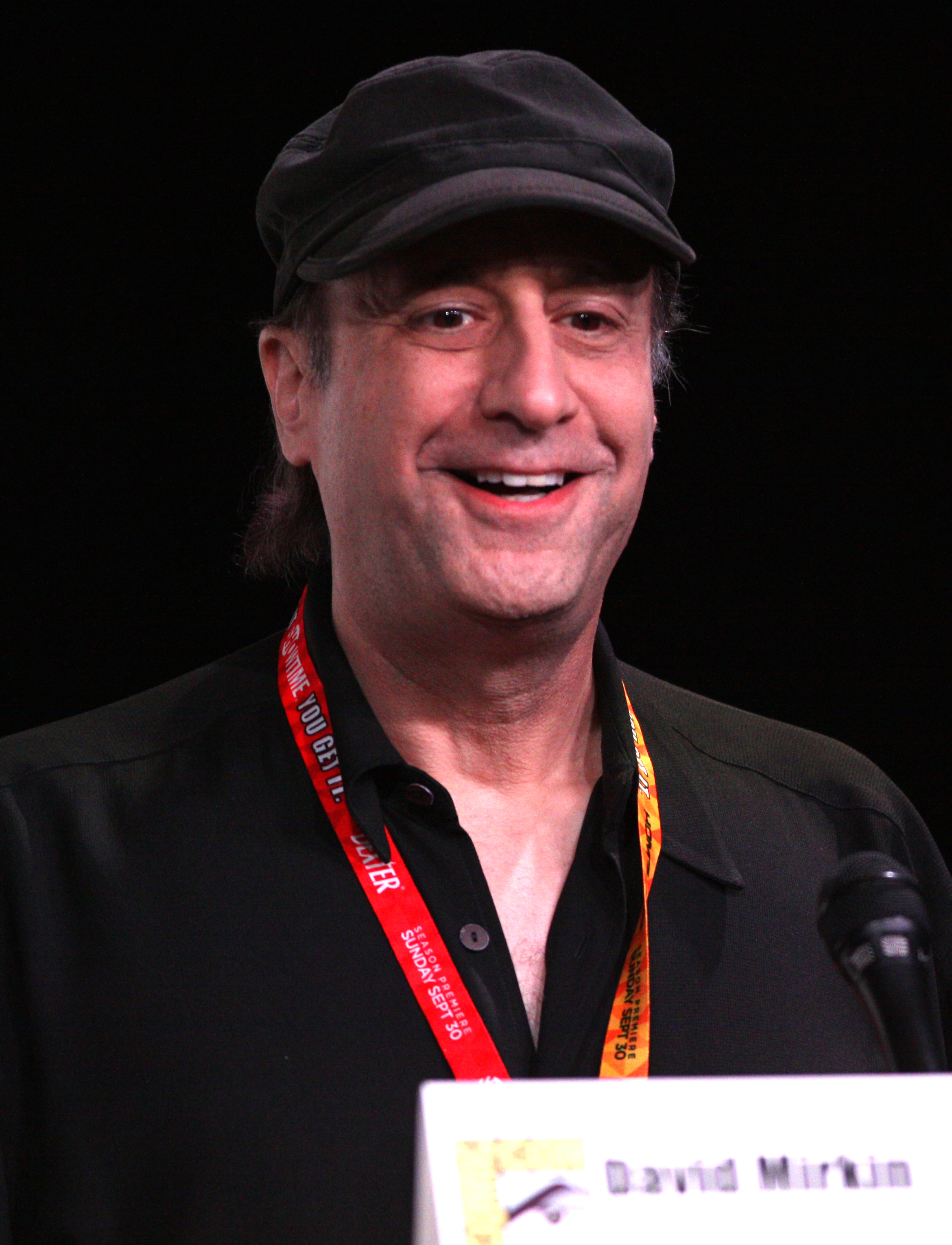
David Mirkin

Several of the show's original writers who had worked on The Simpsons since the first season had left following the completion of season four. David Mirkin took over as showrunner and executive producer for the fifth and sixth season. In The Simpsons: An Uncensored, Unauthorized History (2009), John Ortved describes Mirkin as an "outsider" on the show as, unlike the bulk of the writing staff, Mirkin was not a Harvard University graduate. The writing staff were, at least initially, divided on Mirkin's abilities as a leader. Mirkin conducted the show's writing sessions in one room, rather than splitting the writers into two groups as other showrunners had done, and often worked late into the night. Writer Richard Appel praised Mirkin's leadership and comedy style, saying that "the shows were great under him." In contrast to much of Ortved's account, in a 2004 interview with Animation Magazine, Mirkin stated that he "really wasn't at all intimidat[ed] to join [the show's writing] crew," because he "had worked with and written with" many of his fellow writers previously.

Mirkin said that he "brought [the show] back to a more story-oriented" approach and increased the character and emotion focus, while "at the same time still keeping it surreal and weird". During his tenure, Mirkin moved the show's focus towards Homer, and developed some of the secondary characters, such as Apu. He also strongly opposed censorship and network interference. Mirkin's era and style of humor are popular amongst the show's fans, but the writing staff were divided on his style of humor, which saw the show move away from more "realistic" emotional and character based stories to "pure comedy" and "surreal" humor. The episode "Deep Space Homer" was controversial when the episode was in production. Some of the writers felt that having Homer go into space was too "large" of an idea and Groening felt that the idea was so big that it gave the writers "nowhere to go".

The writing staff wanted to do an episode where the Simpsons family traveled to Australia. They had previously poked fun at several American institutions and thought it would be interesting to poke fun at a whole nation. They purposefully designed Australia and the Australian people very inaccurately and many things were completely made up for fun. The episode "Bart vs. Australia" received a mixed reception in Australia, with some Australian fans saying the episode was a mockery of their country. Shortly after it had aired, the Simpsons staff received over 100 letters from Australians who were insulted by the episode. Reiss claimed that this episode is Australia's least favorite, and that "whenever we have the Simpsons visit another country, that country gets furious, including Australia". He also claimed that they were "condemned in the Australian Parliament after the episode had aired". However, it has been accepted as typical American satire and laughed off.

Former showrunners Jean and Reiss had left to produce their own series, The Critic, along with The Simpsons co-creator Brooks. The Critic was an animated series that revolved around the life of movie critic Jay Sherman. For the second season of The Critic, Brooks cut a deal with the Fox network to have the series switch over. The episode "A Star Is Burns" was pitched by Brooks, who had wanted a crossover that would help launch The Critic on Fox, and he thought having a film festival in Springfield would be a good way to introduce Sherman. In addition, Jean and Reiss returned to produce two episodes ("A Star is Burns" and "'Round Springfield") with the staff of The Critic, to relieve some of the stress on The Simpsons' writing staff. Groening felt that the crossover was a thirty-minute advertisement for another show and blamed Brooks, calling it an attempt to get attention for one of his unsuccessful shows. After unsuccessful attempts to get the episode pulled, he decided to go public with his concerns shortly before the episode aired and had his name removed from the credits. In response, Brooks said, "for years, Al [Jean] and Mike [Reiss] were two guys who worked their hearts out on this show, staying up until 4 in the morning to get it right. The point is, Matt's name has been on Mike's and Al's scripts and he has taken plenty of credit for a lot of their great work. In fact, he is the direct beneficiary of their work. 'The Critic' is their shot and he should be giving them his support."

Groening conceived the idea of an episode in which the character Mr. Burns was shot, which could be used as a publicity stunt. The writers decided to write the episode "Who Shot Mr. Burns?" in two parts with a mystery that could be used in a contest. Part one was the final episode of the sixth season and originally aired on the Fox network on May 21, 1995. Part two was the premiere of the seventh season and originally aired on September 17, 1995. It was important for the writers to design a mystery that had clues, took advantage of freeze frame technology, and was structured around one character who seemed the obvious culprit. In the months following the broadcast of the first part, there was widespread debate among fans of the series as to who shot Mr. Burns. Fox offered a contest to tie in with the mystery where the viewers could guess who the culprit was. It ran from August 13 to September 10 and was one of the first contests to tie together elements of television and the internet. Fox launched a new website, www.Springfield.com, devoted to the mystery which got over 500,000 hits during the summer of 1995. The winner would be animated on an episode of the show. No one, however, was ever animated on the show. This was because no one officially guessed the right answer, so the chosen winner did not have the right answer and was paid a cash prize in lieu of being animated.

== The Oakley and Weinstein years (1995–1997) ==
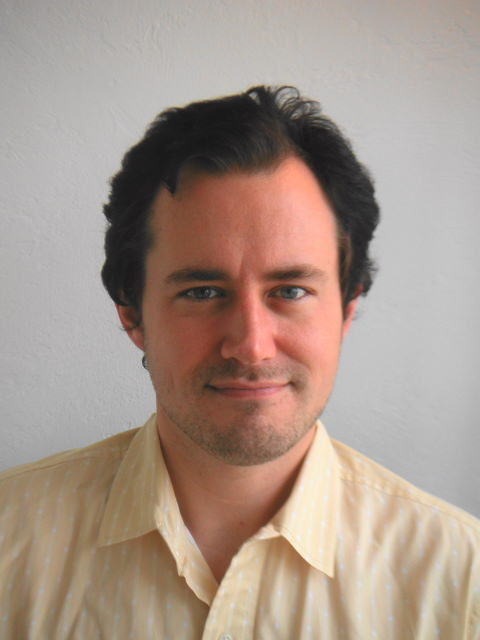
Bill Oakley

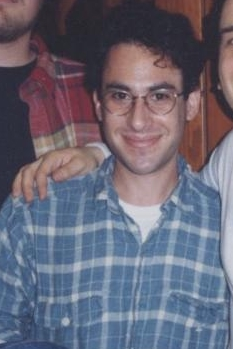
Josh Weinstein

After season six, Mirkin suggested that Bill Oakley and Josh Weinstein take over as showrunners, but remained on the show in an advisory capacity, helping them with technical aspects of the show such as editing and sound mixing, and attending the scripts' table readings. Oakley and Weinstein wanted to produce Treehouse of Horror episodes, episodes about Sideshow Bob, Itchy & Scratchy and several "format-bending" episodes such as "22 Short Films About Springfield". They aimed for "at least two episodes per season that 'pushed the envelope', [and] expanded the definition of what an episode could be." Season eight featured several episodes in which focus was given to secondary characters and in which new issues, such as divorce, were explored. Their preferred choice of guest stars were those with unique and interesting voices, and several of their guest stars were "old grizzled men with distinctive voices".

Their goal for the episodes was to be realistic and focus more on the five members of the Simpson family and explore their feelings and emotions towards each other. Oakley considered season three to be the single greatest comedic season of television ever produced and so attempted to recreate the feel of that season, focusing on stories with real emotions and situations, as well as some off-the-wall episodes. Season three was their basis for Homer: "We liked Homer the way he was in the second and third seasons. That was what we consciously used as our model. Dimwitted, loving, hyper-enthusiastic, creatively goofy, parody of the American father – drawn with real emotions, though admittedly amplified."

The script supervisor for the show and voice of the character Lunchlady Doris, Doris Grau, died on December 30, 1995. The episode "Team Homer", which aired eight days later, was one of the last episodes to feature her voice and featured a dedication to her. From season nine until season eighteen, Lunchlady Doris appeared only as a background character. She returned as a speaking character in several episodes since "The Mook, the Chef, the Wife and Her Homer", and is now voiced by Tress MacNeille.

The episode "Lisa the Vegetarian" featured a permanent character development when Lisa becomes a vegetarian. The story had been pitched by David S. Cohen and the producers felt it would be a surefire way to get Paul McCartney to guest star. McCartney agreed, but only on the condition that Lisa would stay a vegetarian and not revert. The trait stayed and is one of the few permanent character changes made in the show. In the season 13 episode "She of Little Faith", Lisa underwent another permanent character change when she converted to Buddhism.

On February 9, 1997, The Simpsons surpassed The Flintstones with the episode "The Itchy & Scratchy & Poochie Show" as the longest-running prime-time animated series in the United States. The producers took this milestone and made the episode deal with the issue of longevity and the problems that arise when the producers try to make a show "fresh" again; themes commonly known as "jumping the shark". Alan Sepinwall of The Star-Ledger, in a review printed two days after the episode originally aired, praised the writers for not airing a "very special" episode to celebrate the milestone of overtaking The Flintstones. He noted "[the episode is] so self-aware it put the best in-jokes on St. Elsewhere to shame."

== The Scully years (1997–2001) ==
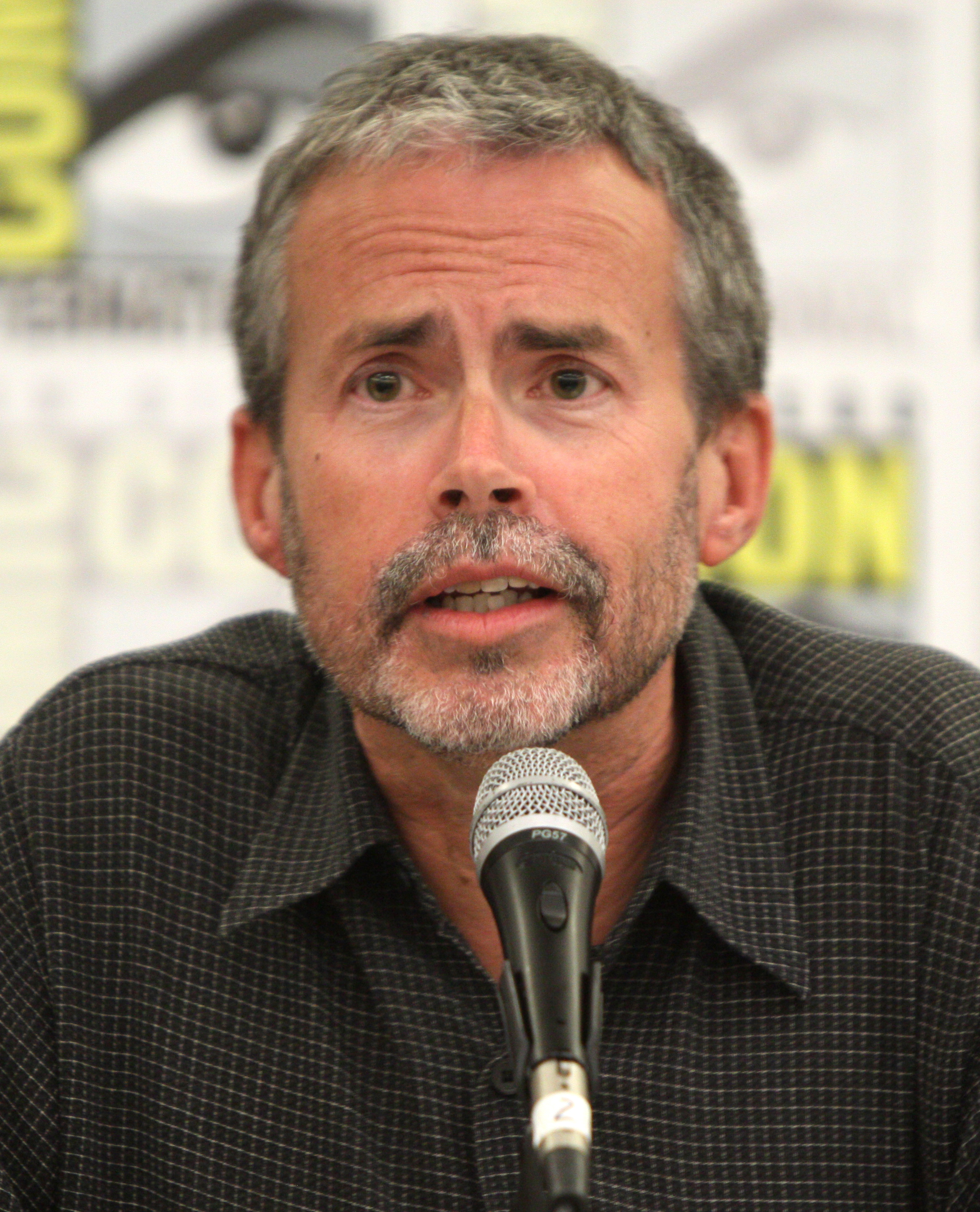
Mike Scully

Oakley and Weinstein stood down as showrunners after season eight because they "didn't want to break [the show]" and Mike Scully took over as showrunner in 1997. As showrunner and executive producer, Scully said his aim was to "not wreck the show", Scully was popular with the staff members, many of whom praised his organization and management skills. Writer Tom Martin said he was "quite possibly the best boss I've ever worked for" and "a great manager of people" while writer Don Payne commented that for Scully "it was really important that we kept decent hours". Scully noted: "I wrote a lot of Lisa's shows. I have five daughters, so I like Lisa a lot. I like Homer, too. Homer comes very naturally to me: I don't know if that's a good or a bad thing. A lot of my favorite episodes are the ones when Homer and Lisa are in conflict with each other... They're very human, I think that's their appeal."

Despite this, Scully's tenure as showrunner of The Simpsons has been the subject of criticism from the show's fans. John Ortved wrote "Scully's episodes excel when compared to what The Simpsons airs nowadays, but he was the man at the helm when the ship turned towards the iceberg." The BBC noted "the common consensus is that The Simpsons' golden era ended after season nine", while an op-ed in Slate by Chris Suellentrop argued The Simpsons changed from a realistic show about family life into a typical cartoon during Scully's years. The Simpsons under Scully has been negatively labelled as a "gag-heavy, Homer-centric incarnation" by Jon Bonné of MSNBC, while some fans have bemoaned the transformation in Homer's character during the era, from dumb yet well-meaning to "a boorish, self-aggrandizing oaf", dubbing him "Jerkass Homer". Martin said that he does not understand the criticism against Scully and that he thinks the criticism "bothered [Scully], and still bothers him, but he managed to not get worked up over it." Ortved noted in his book that it is hard to tell how much of the decline is Scully's fault, and that blaming a single showrunner for lowering the quality of the show "is unfair."

UGO Networks' Brian Tallerico has defended the season against the criticism. He wrote in a 2007 review that comparing "tenth season Simpsons episodes to the prime of the series (3–7) is just unfair and really kind of self-defeating. 'Yeah, I laughed, but not as hard as a couple of years ago. So it sucks.' That's nonsense. The fact is that even the tenth season of The Simpsons was funnier than most [other] show's best years." PopMatters' Hassenger commented in his review that although the show had declined in quality, "this is not to say that these episodes are without their charm; many, in fact, are laugh-out-loud funny and characteristically smart."

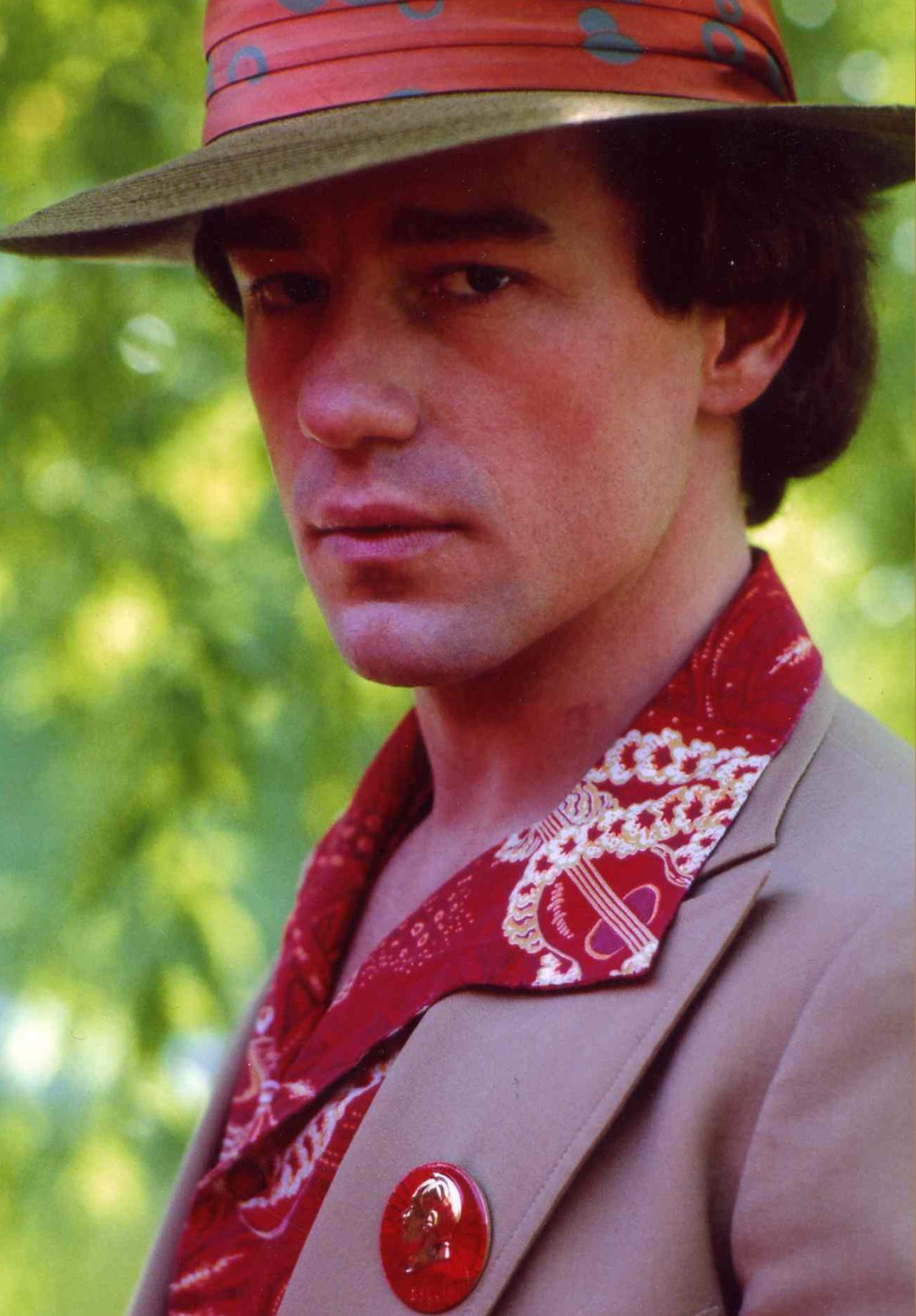
Voice actor Phil Hartman was murdered in 1998.

On May 28, 1998, Phil Hartman, voice actor of Troy McClure and Lionel Hutz, was murdered by his wife, Brynn Omdahl. In the weeks following his death, Hartman was celebrated in a wave of tributes. Dan Snierson of Entertainment Weekly opined that Hartman was "the last person you'd expect to read about in lurid headlines in your morning paper...a decidedly regular guy, beloved by everyone he worked with". After Hartman's death in 1998, rather than replace him with a new voice actor, the production staff retired McClure and Hutz from the show. McClure last appeared in the season ten episode "Bart the Mother", which was dedicated to Hartman.

In the season 10 episode "Thirty Minutes over Tokyo", the family travels to Japan. The episode references and mocks several aspects of Japanese and American culture, as well as differences between the two. At a sumo wrestling match, Bart and Homer encounter the Japanese emperor, Akihito. After Homer throws him into a trunk of sumo thongs, Bart and Homer are put in jail, where they have to re-enact a kabuki play about the forty-seven Ronin, do origami, flower arranging and meditation. The episode also references the Japanese's adaption to American culture. Although all other episodes of The Simpsons have been dubbed and broadcast on Japanese television, "Thirty Minutes Over Tokyo" has never aired in Japan. The episode, which contains a scene showing Homer throwing the Emperor of Japan into a box filled with sumo thongs, was considered disrespectful.

=== Labor difficulties ===
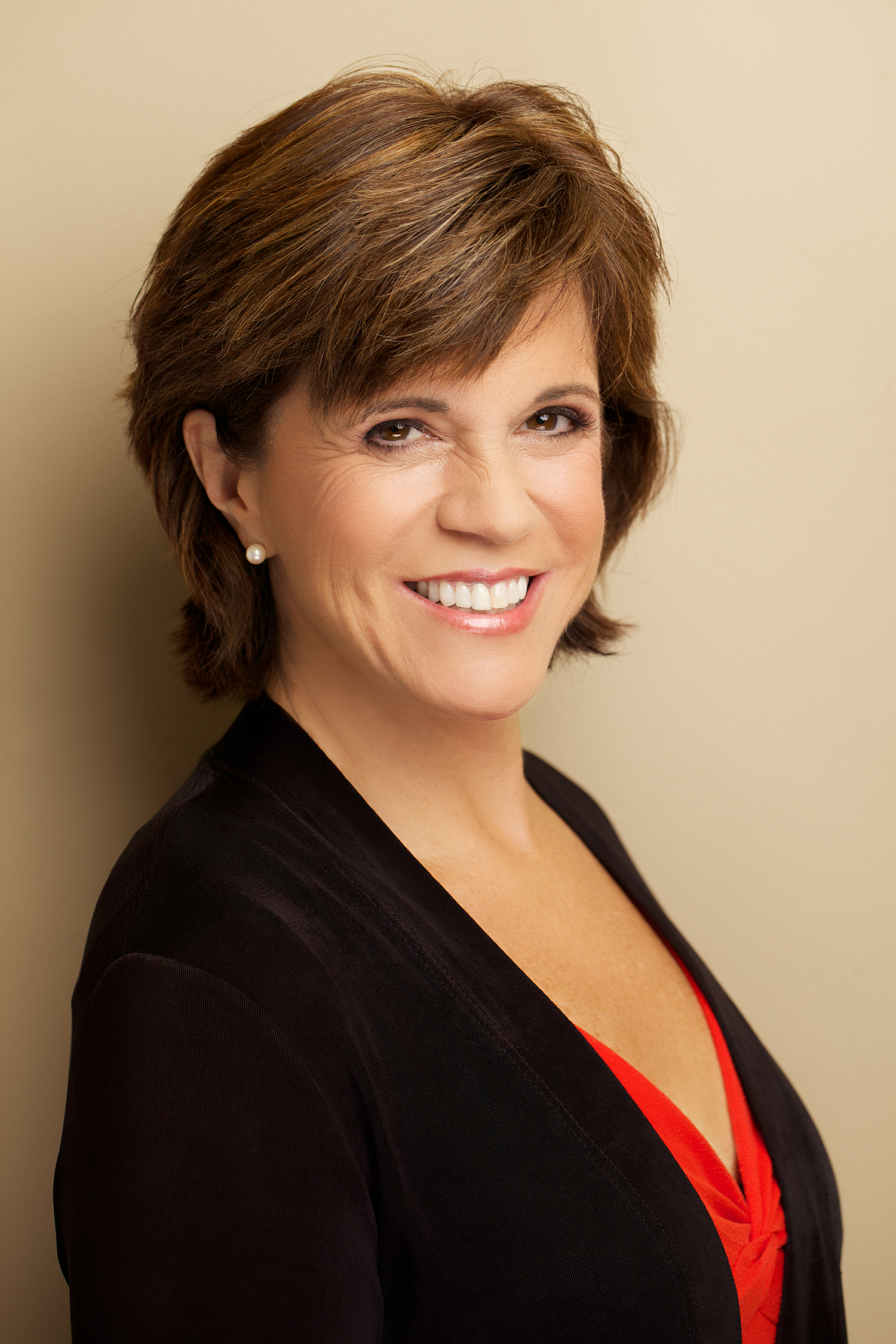
Voice actress Maggie Roswell left The Simpsons over a pay dispute, but returned three years later.

Up until the production of season ten in 1998, the six main voice actors were paid $30,000 per episode. In 1998, a salary dispute between them and the Fox Broadcasting Company arose, with the actors threatening to strike. Fox went as far as preparing for casting of new voices, but an agreement was soon made and their salaries were raised to $125,000 per episode. Groening expressed his sympathy for the actors in an issue of Mother Jones a while after the salary dispute had been settled. He told the magazine: "[The cast members] are incredibly talented, and they deserve a chance to be as rich and miserable as anyone else in Hollywood." The show also made a change for the writers to become covered under a Writers Guild of America (WGA) agreement. Most writers on primetime series television belong to the WGA, but The Simpsons as well as other animated shows on Fox were different. Scully commented that "everyone expected a big fight with the studio" and continued that "it never materialized, because they conceded that prime-time animation was successful and everyone was benefiting."

Voice actress Maggie Roswell left The Simpsons in spring 1999 after a pay dispute with Fox. The network originally reported that she decided to quit only because she was tired of flying between Denver and Los Angeles for the recording sessions. It was then announced by Roswell that she had asked for a raise, not only because she was tired of the traveling, but because of the increasing cost of flight tickets. Roswell was paid $1,500 to $2,000 per episode during the three seasons before she left, and she asked Fox for a raise to $6,000 per episode. However, Fox only offered her a $150 raise, which did not even cover the travel costs, so she decided to quit. As a result of Roswell's departure, the Maude Flanders character was killed off in the episode "Alone Again, Natura-Diddily". Voice actress Marcia Mitzman Gaven was hired to fill in for Roswell's other characters. Roswell returned to The Simpsons in 2002 in the season premiere of the fourteenth season. She reached a deal with Fox to record her lines from her Denver home and thus the dispute ended.

== The return of Jean (2001–2007) ==
Jean returned full-time to The Simpsons during the tenth season. He once again became showrunner with the start of the thirteenth season in 2001, this time without Reiss. Jean said that "the hardest thing at this point is just thinking of fresh ideas. People are so on top of things that we've done before, so the challenge now is to think of an idea that's good, but hasn't been seen." In April 2001, in an interview with The New York Times, Jean stated that he wanted "to take the show back to the family". His return was welcomed, with MSNBC's Jon Bonné stating: "[Jean] has guided the show away from its gag-heavy, Homer-centric incarnation... these are certainly brighter days for the show's long-time fans." Bill Gibron of PopMatters.com noted that "the show corralled much of its craziness for more personal stories" and that "Homer's Neanderthal nonsense and bratty Bart gave way to 'softer' episodes focusing on Marge and Lisa."

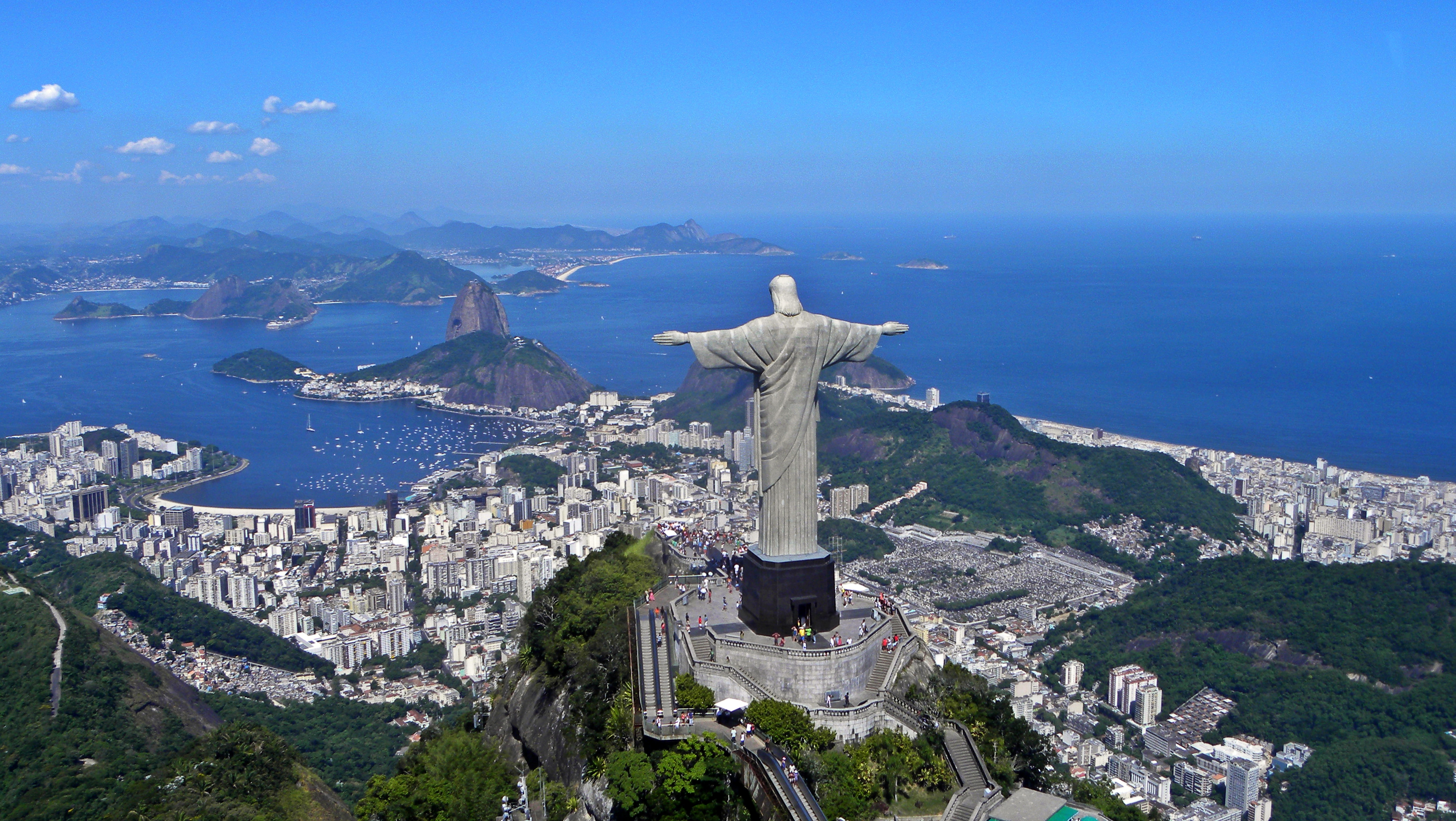
The Simpsons' visit to Rio de Janeiro almost led to a lawsuit and a diplomatic incident.

In the season 13 episode "Blame It on Lisa", The Simpsons visit Rio de Janeiro in Brazil. In the week following the episode's original broadcast, it faced intense controversy involving the country of Brazil, most specifically the Rio de Janeiro Tourist Board (Riotur). The board claimed that the city was portrayed as having rampant street crime, kidnappings, slums and a rat infestation. The tourist board asserted that the show "went too far" and undermined an $18m (£12.5m) advertising campaign to attract visitors to the city. Fernando Henrique Cardoso, then the president of Brazil, stated that the episode "brought a distorted vision of Brazilian reality." By April 9, Riotur was preparing to sue the producers and Fox for damage to its international image and loss of revenue. The issue threatened to become a diplomatic incident. Upon knowledge of an impending lawsuit, the show's producers contacted Fox lawyers, who informed them that a city could not technically sue for defamation. In response, executive producer Brooks apologized, stating "we apologize to the lovely city and people of Rio de Janeiro". Jean commented that it was "one of the biggest controversies in the history of the show".

In season 14, production switched from traditional cel animation to digital ink and paint. The first episode to experiment with digital coloring was "Radioactive Man" in 1995. Animators used digital ink and paint during production of the season 12 episode "Tennis the Menace", but Gracie Films delayed the regular use of digital ink and paint until two seasons later. The already completed "Tennis the Menace" was broadcast as made.

As the show's revenue continued to rise through syndication and DVD sales, the main cast stopped appearing for script readings in April 2004. The work stoppage occurred after weeks of unsuccessful negotiations with Fox, in which the cast asked for an increase in their pay to $360,000 per episode, or $8 million over a 22-episode season. The strike was resolved a month later and their salary was raised to something between $250,000 and $360,000 per episode.

Season 16 featured one of the few major character developments since the show's inception. It was reported a long time in advance of the airing of the episode "There's Something About Marrying" that a major character would come out as gay during the episode. At San Diego Comic-Con in July 2004, Al Jean revealed: "We have a show where, to raise money, Springfield legalises gay marriage. Homer becomes a minister by going on the internet and filling out a form. A long-time character comes out of the closet, but I'm not saying who." This led to much media speculation and publicity in the press for the episode. Many fans correctly guessed that it would be one of Homer's sisters-in-law, either Patty or Selma, while others believed it to be Waylon Smithers.

== Film (2007) ==
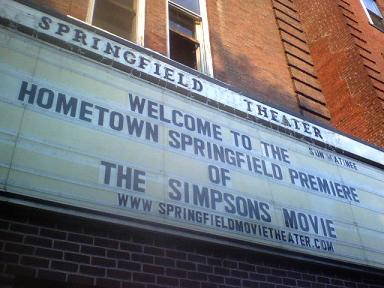
The Simpsons Movie premiered in Springfield, Vermont.

20th Century Fox, Gracie Films, and Film Roman produced an animated The Simpsons film that was released on July 27, 2007. The production staff of The Simpsons had entertained the thought of a film since early in the series, but production never came together. Groening felt a feature-length film would allow them to increase the show's scale and animate sequences too complex for a television series. The film was directed by David Silverman and written by a team of Simpsons writers comprising Groening, Brooks, Jean, Reiss, Mirkin, Scully, George Meyer, John Swartzwelder, Jon Vitti, Matt Selman, and Ian Maxtone-Graham. Work continued on the screenplay from 2003 onwards and did not cease, taking place in the small bungalow where Groening first pitched The Simpsons in 1987. Groening read about a town that had to get rid of pig feces in their water supply, which inspired the plot of the film. He also wanted to make the film dramatically stronger than a TV episode, as "we wanna really give you something that you haven't seen before." Production of the film occurred alongside continued writing of the series despite long-time claims by those involved in the show that a film would enter production only after the series had concluded.

After winning a Fox and USA Today competition, Springfield, Vermont, hosted the film's world premiere. The Simpsons Movie grossed a combined total of $74 million in its opening weekend in the United States, taking it to the top of the box office, and set the record for highest grossing opening weekend for a film based on a television series, surpassing Mission: Impossible 2. It opened at the top of the international box office, taking $96 million from seventy-one overseas territories — including $27.8 million in the United Kingdom, making it Fox's second highest opening ever in that country. In Australia, it grossed A$13.2 million, the biggest opening for an animated film and third largest opening weekend in the country. As of November 23, 2007, the film has a worldwide gross of $525,267,904. The film garnered a 90% approval rating on Rotten Tomatoes, with 171 of a total 191 reviews being determined as positive. It received a rating of 80 out of 100 (signifying "generally favorable reviews") on Metacritic from 36 reviews.

== Post movie seasons (2007–2019) ==
Jean continued as showrunner after the movie. Critics have argued that the quality of the show has declined in Jean's tenure. Jacob Burch, an administrator of the website NoHomers.com, said in an interview that the show "seems less cohesive, more about trying to get the jokes in there, instead of make a story and let the jokes come off of that" and adds "I just think there's only so much you can do [with the characters]." Steven Hyden of The A.V. Club argues in an online debate over this issue that "The Simpsons has come to rely too much on wacky Homer shtick and tired, meaningless guest stars" and that the writers are "content to amuse themselves with in-jokes, non sequiturs, and self-consciously silly plot twists." Jean responded to this criticism by saying: "Well, it's possible that we've declined. But honestly, I've been here the whole time and I do remember in season two people saying, 'It's gone downhill.' If we'd listened to that then we would have stopped after episode 13. I'm glad we didn't."

The writers of The Simpsons went on strike together with the Writers Guild of America at the end of 2007. The broadcasting of The Simpsons was not affected by the strike. Since it takes a long time to produce an episode of an animated show, the episodes are written up to a year in advance. So the strike would have had to go on for a while for the show to have run out of new episodes. Production of season 19 was further delayed because of contract negotiations with the six main voice actors. The dispute was resolved, and the actors' salary was raised to $400,000 per episode. The delay in production has caused the planned 22 episodes to be shortened to 20.

=== 20th anniversary and run length record ===
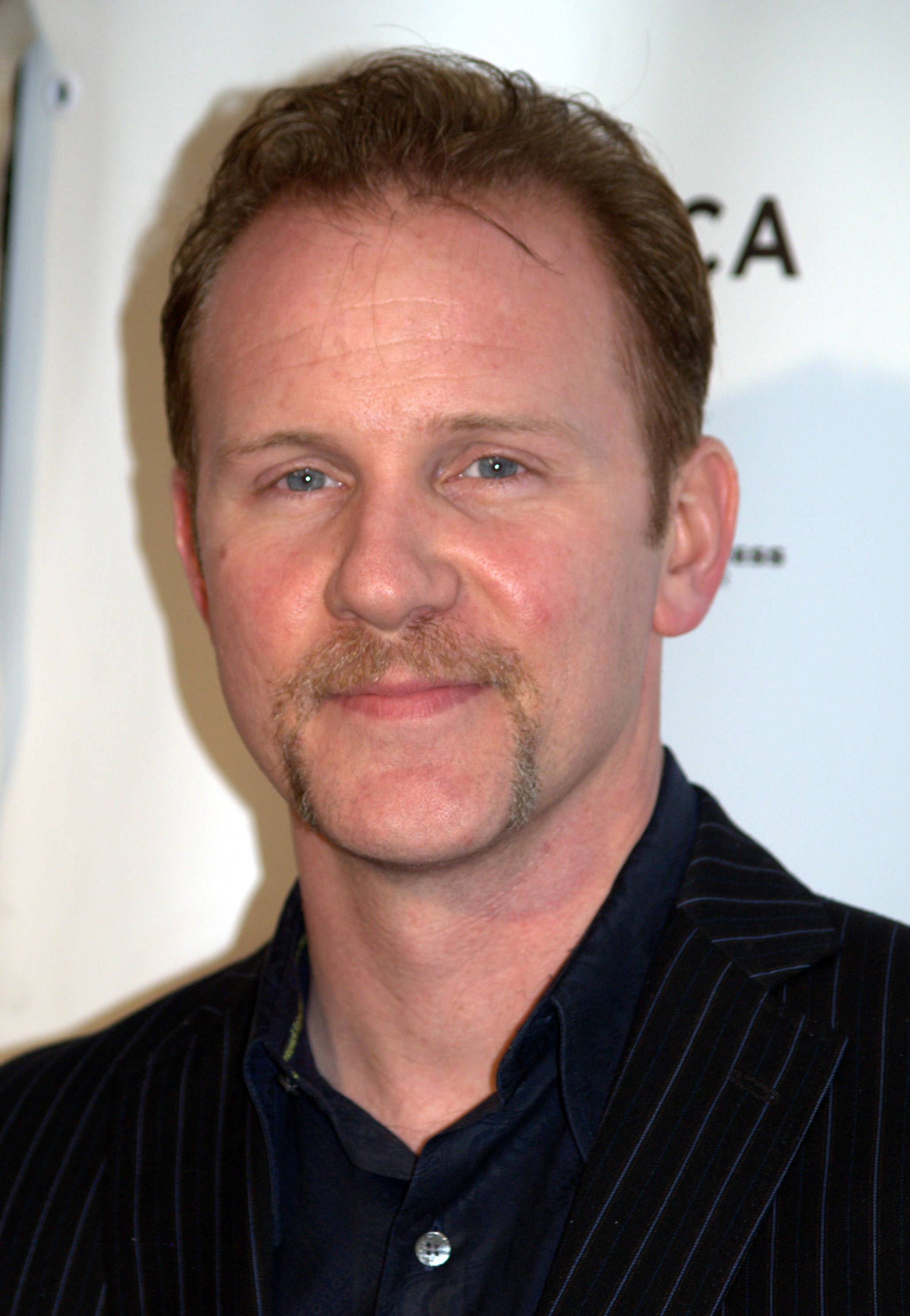
Morgan Spurlock produced a documentary on The Simpsons in order to celebrate the show's 20th anniversary.

To celebrate the 20th anniversary of the premiere of The Simpsons, Fox announced a year-long celebration of the show titled "Best. 20 Years. Ever.", which ran from January 14, 2009, to January 14, 2010. Morgan Spurlock, an Academy Award-nominated documentary filmmaker (Best Documentary Feature for Super Size Me in 2004) and fan of The Simpsons since his college days, was asked to direct the special The Simpsons 20th Anniversary Special – In 3-D! On Ice! in February 2009. Spurlock believes "the reason [the producers] called [him] to begin with was to not have a show that would be a glad-hand, pat-everyone-on-the-back special, that's why rooting it in the people who kept this show on the air for the last 20 years is important." It was shown on January 10, 2010, alongside "Once Upon a Time in Springfield", which was promoted as the 450th episode of the series.

The episode "Million Dollar Maybe" featured a new character created by the winner of the "Best. Character. Ever." contest, in which fans could submit their own ideas for a new, and possibly recurring, Simpsons character. Over 25,000 entries were sent in. The winner of the contest was Peggy Black from Orange, Connecticut, who created the character Ricardo Bomba. She described Ricardo as "someone that all the women love and all the men want to be" and "something like a Casanova." Jean was one of the judges of the contest, which he described as "a thank you to loyal fans." He also noted that there is a possibility the Ricardo character might appear on the show again. Another change was to air The Simpsons in 720p high-definition television with the episode "Take My Life, Please" on February 15, 2009. With the new broadcasting system came a new opening sequence. It was the first major permanent change to the show's introduction since the beginning of the show's second season in 1990; previous changes have included variations in the duration of the intro. This new intro also includes some 3D animation when the camera pans over Springfield.

To commemorate the show's twentieth anniversary, the United States Postal Service unveiled a series of five 44 cent stamps featuring Homer, Marge, Bart, Lisa and Maggie. The stamps, designed by Groening, were made available for purchase on May 7, 2009 and approximately one billion stamps were printed. The Simpsons is the first television series still in production to receive this recognition. After entering its 21st season in late 2009, the show beat Gunsmoke's record as the longest-running American primetime, scripted television series.

=== Cancellation threat ===
On October 4, 2011, 20th Century Fox Television released a statement saying: "23 seasons in, The Simpsons is as creatively vibrant as ever and beloved by millions around the world. We believe this brilliant series can and should continue, but we cannot produce future seasons under its current financial model. We are hopeful that we can reach an agreement with the voice cast that allows The Simpsons to go on entertaining audiences with original episodes for many years to come." One of the problems was that The Simpsons was possibly worth more cancelled than on the air. A 17-year-old syndication deal with local television stations prohibits Fox from selling the show to cable networks. As long as The Simpsons still produces new episodes, Fox cannot break this deal. In the meantime, cable networks have grown to become just as big a market as the local television stations. Another consideration was that Fox's parent company News Corporation was having meetings discussing the possibility of a cable channel that would only air The Simpsons episodes. Analysts consider a cancellation and subsequent second-run deal that includes cable networks to be worth $750 million. On this issue, Jean commented in an interview with TV Guide that "It's a big company, and there are definitely people whose interests would have been better served by ending it. Those interests were superseded because we're still valuable to the network in terms of our ratings."

For the negotiations, the studio requested that the cast members accept a 45 percent cut of their salaries so that more seasons could be produced after season 23, or else that season would be the series' last. The actors were willing to take a pay cut, but wanted a percentage of the back-end payments instead. At one point Shearer even offered a 70 percent pay cut in exchange for back-end percentages, but the studio was unwilling to make any deal involving back-end percentages. In the end, the studio and the actors reached a deal, in which the actors would take a pay cut of 30 percent, down to just over $300,000 per episode, prolonging the show to its 25th season. As well as the voice actors, everybody involved in the show took a pay cut. This included animators, writers, the post-production crew and even Jean himself. The further use of digital animation also saves money, as the animation of the show becomes more efficient.

In 2013, FXX purchased the exclusive American cable rights to the series. In August 2014, a new website and app was launched called Simpsons World, which contained every episode from the show's first 25 seasons that were available for viewing with a valid cable login. The website, which updated regularly, was only available in the United States.

In 2016, The Simpsons moved the production of the animation from Film Roman to Fox Television Animation in season 28.

In February 2019, the series was renewed for a 31st and 32nd season bringing the series up to 713 episodes, making it the first scripted primetime series to surpass 700 episodes.

In March 2019, the episode "Stark Raving Dad" was pulled from circulation following the release of the Leaving Neverland documentary and renewed discussion of Michael Jackson's sexual abuse allegations. The episode also was omitted from the Disney+ streaming service.

== Acquisition by Disney and future (2019–present) ==
In March 2019, following the acquisition of 21st Century Fox by Disney, The Simpsons, among other franchises and studios owned by 21st Century Fox, became properties of The Walt Disney Company.

On April 11, 2019, it was announced that the series would stream exclusively on Disney+ at launch; as a result, Simpsons World was officially shut down on November 16 of that year, four days after Disney+'s launch. Initially, episodes from the first 20 seasons that were originally broadcast in the 4:3 aspect ratio were only available in a cropped 16:9 format, a move which received heavy criticism from fans. On May 28, 2020, Disney+ introduced a new feature that allows viewers to toggle between the original 4:3 aspect ratio and the remastered 16:9 ratio for seasons 1–20.

In May 2019, FXX's sister network Freeform began sharing the off-network rights to the series and began airing it on October 2, 2019.

As part of the series' 30th anniversary, FXX (in association with Disney+) aired a fourteen-day marathon titled The Simpsons: Plus Sized Holiday Marathon, airing 661 episodes and the movie. The marathon premiered exactly 30 years after the series premiere on December 17, 2019, at 8pm ET and concluded on January 1, 2020.

On February 27, 2020, Disney announced that a second short film based on the series, titled Playdate with Destiny, would release ahead of Pixar's Onward, making it the third piece of Simpsons media to be released in theaters.

On March 3, 2021, The Simpsons was renewed for a 33rd and 34th season, with a further extension for a 35th and 36th season on January 26, 2023. During this time, numerous Simpsons Disney+ shorts began to premiere.

During the show’s 33rd season, executive producer Matt Selman replaced Al Jean as primary showrunner moving forward, although Jean continued to be showrunner for several episodes each season. Holdovers of Season 36 that aired as part of season 37 marked Jean's last credit as primary showrunner, as he returned to his role as consulting producer from this season onward.

On April 2, 2025, the show was renewed for four additional seasons on Fox, up to a 40th season, with at least 15 episodes each.

During this period, episodes of the show began to be released as Disney+ exclusives. The first was the two-part "O C'mon All Ye Faithful", which was produced as part of season 36. For season 37 onward, fifteen episodes will be broadcast on Fox, with two Disney+ exclusive specials planned per season.

In September 2025, a sequel to The Simpsons Movie was announced with a July 23, 2027 theatrical release. It was pushed back to September 3 to avoid competition with A Minecraft Movie Squared.

== See also ==
- Reception of The Simpsons
