= Marcia =

Marcia may refer to:

== People ==
- Marcia (given name)
- James Marcia, Canadian psychologist
- Stefano Marcia (born 1993), South African Olympic sailor
- Marcia (wife of Cato), wife of Cato the Younger

== Other uses ==
- Marcia (Beccafumi), a c. 1519 painting by Domenico Beccafumi
- Marcia (bivalve), a genus of Venus clams in the family Veneridae
- Marcia (gens), a Roman gens
- Marcia: Greatest Hits 1975–1983, a 2004 album by Marcia Hines
- Marcia, the Italian musical designation for a march or march tempo
- Hyundai Marcia, a sedan produced by Hyundai for the South Korean market

== See also ==
- Martia (disambiguation)
- Martian (disambiguation)
- Mars (disambiguation)
- Marsia (disambiguation)
- Marzia (disambiguation)
- Mercia (disambiguation)
