= Marsia =

Marsia may refer to:

- Marsiya, a genre of elegy written by Shia Muslims to commemorate the martyrdom of Hussain
- Marsica, a historical region in Abruzzo, Italy, anciently inhabited by the Marsi people
  - Marsia, a borough of Tagliacozzo, Abruzzo, Italy
  - San Benedetto dei Marsi, Abruzzo, Italy, also formerly known as Marsia
- Marsia, a borough of Roccafluvione, Marche, Italy
- Marsia Alexander-Clarke (born 1939), American video installation artist
- Marsia Geldert-Murphey, American politician

== See also ==
- Marsyas (disambiguation)
- Marcia (disambiguation)
- Marzia (disambiguation)
