= Martius =

Martius may refer to:

- Martius (month), the month of March in the ancient Roman calendar
- Campus Martius, the "Field of Mars" in ancient Rome
- Telo Martius, an ancient name for Toulon, France

== People ==
- Carl Friedrich Philipp von Martius (1794–1868), German botanist
- Hedwig Conrad-Martius (1888–1966), German phenomenologist
- Carl Alexander von Martius (1838–1920), German chemist, company founder and entrepreneur

== Other uses ==
- Dryocopus martius, the black woodpecker
- Martius yellow, a chemical compound and dye
- Trachycarpus martianus, also known as Martius' fan palm
- Hofmann-Martius rearrangement, in chemistry

== See also ==
- Marcius (disambiguation)
- Mars (disambiguation)
- Campus Martius (disambiguation)
