= Martia =

Martia may refer to:

- Martia L. Davis Berry (1844-1894), social reformer
- Martia (moth), a genus of insects in the family Pyralidae
- Oxyepoecus, an ant genus, one of whose former names was Martia
- Legio IV Martia, a legion of the Roman Empire
- Martia, a character in the 1991 film Star Trek VI: The Undiscovered Country

== See also ==
- Martian (disambiguation)
- Marcia (disambiguation)
- Martial (disambiguation)
- Rony Martias (born 1980) French cyclist
