= Marzia (given name) =

Marzia is a feminine given name of Italian origin, derived from the Latin "Martia", meaning "dedicated to Mars," the Roman god of war, suggesting strength and valor, though modern usage softens these martial connotations. It's an Italian form of Marcia, with variations like Marzieh (Persian/Urdu for "accepted") People with this name include:

- Marzia Basel (born 1968), Afghan judge
- Marzia Caravelli (born 1981), Italian athlete
- Marzia Gazzetta (born 1967), Italian athlete
- Marzia Kjellberg (née Bisognin, born 1992), Italian internet personality and entrepreneur
- Marzia Piazza (born 1951), Venezuelan beauty pageant queen
- Marzia Stano, Italian singer
- Marzia Tedeschi (born 1976), Italian actress
- Marzieh Khakifirooz (born 1982), Iranian Scientist

== See also ==
- Marzia (disambiguation)
- Marcia (given name)
- Marziale
- Marzian, Lorestan
