= Marzia (disambiguation) =

Marzia Kjellberg (born 1992), better known online as just Marzia, is an Italian Internet personality, fashion designer, and entrepreneur.

Marzia or MARZIA can also refer to:

- Marzia (given name), a feminine given name
- MARZIA, a brand of Nardi, an Italian agricultural manufacturing group

== See also ==
- Marcia (disambiguation)
- Marsia (disambiguation)
