= Marcius =

Marcius may refer to:

- Marcius (family), ancient Romans
- Marcius (insect), a genus in family Alydidae

== See also ==
- Martius (disambiguation)
- Marsyas (disambiguation)
