= Red Planet (miniseries) =

- Genre: Science fiction
- Based on: Red Planet by Robert Heinlein
- Voices of: Pat Fraley; Mark Hamill; Haven Hartman; Benny Luciano; Roddy McDowall; Marcia Mitzman Gaven; Stanley Ralph Ross; Nick Tate
- Country of origin: United States
- Original language: English
- No. of seasons: 1
- No. of episodes: 3

Original release
- Network: Fox Kids
- Release: May 14 – May 28, 1994

Red Planet is a 1994 animated miniseries created by Gunther-Wahl Productions. It was adapted from the 1949 Robert A. Heinlein novel of the same name, with the teleplay written by Julia Lewald. The miniseries had three half-hour episodes.

Ownership of the series passed to Disney in 2001 when Disney acquired Fox Kids Worldwide.

== Plot summary ==
Jim Marlowe (voiced by Benny Grant), Jr., and his little sister, Phillis Jane "P.J." Marlowe (voiced by Haven Hartman), are teens growing up on the distant mining world of New Aries. Life on New Aries is difficult, with its surface being a red-colored desert. Along with the harsh climate and severe weather, there are many dangerous creatures living on New Aries, such as the three-headed Cerberus Hounds, the swift and voracious Water Seekers, and the misunderstood Locals, creatures so rare and dangerous they border on urban legend.

Jim has recently acquired a new pet, a "roundhead" called Willis (voiced by Pat Fraley) with the parrot-like ability to mimic human speech and record conversations. When Willis needs to move quickly, he extends his limbs which gives him a quadruped appearance, and can climb virtually anything. Willis is small, furry, and playful, can survive both on the surface of New Aries and the Earth-like atmosphere of the colony, and has some sort of connection with the Locals on an almost empathic level.

As Jim and P.J. are about to be sent off to a boarding school, their mother (voiced by Marcia Mitzman Gaven), the colony's medical officer, discovers a substance deep within the mines that is killing the miners. The school's headmaster Marcus Howe (voiced by Roddy McDowall) and the colony leader (voiced by Nick Tate)—a company man from the Beta Earth Mining Company—learn of Jim Marlowe's new pet, and plot to steal him for medical experiment in order to generate a serum to protect the miners, and thus, keep the company in the black. Willis records this entire conversation, which prompts Jim, Willis, and P.J. to escape into the desert. With their life-support running low, they are forced to take shelter in a carnivorous plant, using the process of photosynthesis so the plant will generate oxygen and keep them alive.

Running from New Aries' many dangerous life-forms, they are eventually found by the Locals. They are enraged by the attempted capture of the tiny Willis. In the end, only Jim and Willis' friendship save the colony world from destruction by the angered natives, who reveal themselves to be an intelligent, highly advanced subterranean race.

Willis then tells Jim that it is time for him to go. He is finished being a child, and must become an adult via metamorphosis. One of the colony's doctors correctly assumed that Willis was not a separate species from the Locals, but rather a Local in its infant form. Jim says that he will wait for Willis to finish changing, but Willis states that this will take a long, long time. He and Jim will probably never see one another again.

Many decades later, New Aries has been terraformed into a green, Earth-like world, with humans and Locals living side by side in peace. Willis, now a full-grown Local, has befriended Jim's young granddaughter, and spends time with her wandering the grass-covered hills and telling her stories of the adventures he and her grandfather had together.

== Episodes ==
1. Part 1 (5/14/94): written by Martin Isenberg, Robert Skir, and Julia Jane Lewald
2. Part 2 (5/21/94): written by Julia Jane Lewald
3. Part 3 (5/28/94): TBA

== Differences from novel ==
- The story takes place on the fictitious planet of New Aries instead of Mars. It (supposedly) has a higher gravity than Mars, making it somewhere closer to Earth's.
- Jim's little sister, P.J. is the main supporting character. In the novel, this role was filled by his classmate, Frank Sutton.
- The main conflict in the novel was that the colonial governor was attempting to find some way to keep the miners working during the harsh winter months as well as their families need not move during the unbearable time on the planet, as the annual migration could get expensive. In the miniseries, the main problem was missed work as poison in the mine was slowly killing the miners.
- In the novel, Willis is confiscated by the school's headmaster since it is against the rules to have pets. He is then taken from the headmaster by the colony leader, Beecher, in order to sell him to the London Zoo for a hefty sum. In the miniseries, both the headmaster and the colony leader are in on a plot to steal Willis and study his alien physiology to find an antidote to the poison in the mines.

== Intent ==
Karen Barnes, who acted as the vice president of Fox Kids programming, said that Red Planet received the adaptation because it has many "characters that kids can relate to."
