= Marsyas (disambiguation) =

Marsyas is a satyr who had a music contest with Apollo.

Marsyas may also refer to:

- Marsyas (horse), a French Thoroughbred racehorse
- 343158 Marsyas, an Apollo asteroid on a retrograde orbit

== Art ==
- A bust of a screaming Marsyas, sculpted by Balthasar Permoser
- Marsyas (sculpture), a sculpture by Anish Kapoor and Cecil Balmond

== Biology ==
- Marsyas (beetle), a genus of beetles in the family Carabidae
- Pseudolycaena marsyas, a species of butterfly

== People ==
- Marsyas' Painter (4th century BC), ancient Greek vase painter
- Marsyas of Pella (356–294), ancient Greek historian
- Marsyas of Philippi (3rd century BC), ancient Greek historian
