= Alone Again, Natura-Diddily =

- The Simpsons episode
- Episode no.: Season 11; Episode 14
- Directed by: Jim Reardon
- Written by: Ian Maxtone-Graham
- Production code: BABF10
- Original air date: February 13, 2000

Guest appearance
- Shawn Colvin as Rachel Jordan

Episode features
- Chalkboard gag: "My suspension was not 'mutual'"
- Couch gag: The Simpsons come in on bumper cars. Homer is then pinned to the wall and slammed repeatedly.
- Commentary: Mike Scully; George Meyer; Ian Maxtone-Graham; Matt Selman; Jim Reardon; Mark Kirkland

Episode chronology
← Previous "Saddlesore Galactica"	Next → "Missionary: Impossible"
- The Simpsons season 11

"Alone Again, Natura-Diddily" is the fourteenth episode of the eleventh season of the American television series The Simpsons, and marks the final regular appearance of the character Maude Flanders. The episode aired on Fox on February 13, 2000. In the episode, she is killed in an accident while watching an auto race, devastating Ned Flanders and prompting Homer to find a new woman for his grieving friend. After a series of unsuccessful dates, Ned begins to question his faith in God. However, his faith is restored after hearing the female lead singer of a Christian rock band, played by guest star Shawn Colvin, sing in church. The episode's title is a parody of the song title "Alone Again (Naturally)" by Gilbert O'Sullivan.

The episode was written by Ian Maxtone-Graham and directed by Jim Reardon. Maude was voiced by Marcia Mitzman Gaven after regular voice actor Maggie Roswell had left the show over a pay dispute, and the producers decided to kill off the character and make Ned Flanders a single father to open up for new storylines. The episode was viewed in 10.8 million households during its original broadcast, and was the highest-rated show on Fox the week it aired.

A commercial for "Alone Again, Natura-Diddily" that aired before the episode was broadcast was criticized by many viewers because it showed that the episode was parodying a 1999 incident at Charlotte Motor Speedway in Charlotte, North Carolina that left three spectators dead. Then-Fox affiliate WCCB in Charlotte, North Carolina refused to show the commercial, but after viewing the episode they came to the conclusion that it was not making fun of the incident.

Reviews of "Alone Again, Natura-Diddily" from television critics have been mixed.

== Plot ==
The Simpson family are hiking in the countryside, which Lisa says is "paradise"; but she is dismayed when they discover that a bird sanctuary is encircled by an oval racing track. However, given free tickets, they stay to watch the races. Their next-door neighbor, Ned Flanders and his family are there: he says he appreciates the drivers' excellent safety measures. Later, a squad of cheerleaders fires free T-shirts from air cannons into the crowd, and a shirtless Homer urges them to send him one. The cheerleaders send a full salvo of T-shirts to him, but he gets distracted and bends down to pick up a bobby pin and the shirts knock Maude over the back of the bleachers and she falls to her death, devastating Ned.

Homer goes home with Ned after the funeral and tries to console him, but realizes his actions had a role in Maude's death - admitting that he had parked in the ambulance zone, thus preventing any possible resuscitation. Guilt-ridden, Homer secretly makes a videotape of Ned to show to single women in the hopes of helping Ned move on. Despite the amateur editing, which even includes footage of Maggie's birth that Homer could not tape over, Ned meets several women, including Lindsey Naegle and Edna Krabappel, but the meetings are unsuccessful.

On a Saturday night, Ned prays, and is angry not to receive any response. The next morning, his sons are horrified when Ned indignantly refuses to attend church. He soon regrets this, and heads to the church to find a Christian rock band, Kovenant, performing a song about God's support through trying times; his belief in God revitalized, Ned bonds with the singer, Rachel Jordan, and she promises to meet up with him when she returns from her band's tour.

== Production ==
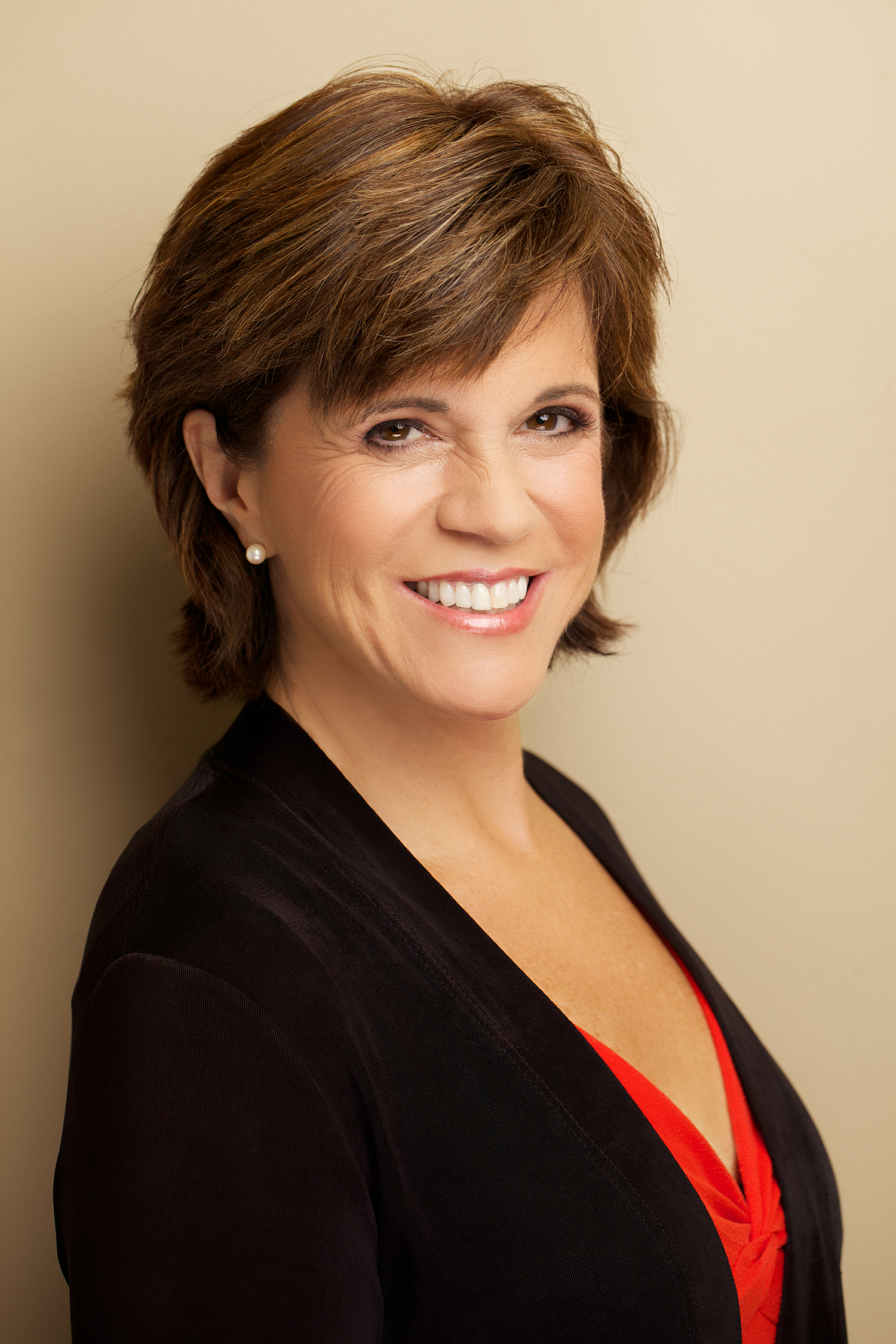
Maggie Roswell, the original voice of Maude.

"Alone Again, Natura-Diddily" was written by Ian Maxtone-Graham and directed by Jim Reardon as part of the eleventh season of the show (1999–2000). When the writing staff conceived the idea for the speedway parts, they were thinking that it would be a great opportunity for them to get several NASCAR drivers to make guest appearances in the episode. However, according to Scully, they could not get a single one because "they were all concerned about the way we were portraying NASCAR". Speedway racing is depicted in a negative light in the episode, with an emphasis on car crashes.

The episode features the death of the character Maude Flanders, who had previously been voiced by cast member Maggie Roswell. This kill-off was the result of Roswell leaving The Simpsons in spring 1999 after a pay dispute with the Fox Broadcasting Company, which airs the show. Since 1994, she had been flying between her Denver home and Los Angeles twice a week to record episodes of The Simpsons. She eventually grew tired of this, as the price of plane tickets was constantly increasing. As a result, she asked Fox for a pay raise from $2,000 per episode to $6,000 per episode. However, Fox only offered her a $150 raise, which did not cover the travel costs, so she decided to quit.

Voice actress Marcia Mitzman Gaven was hired to fill in for Roswell's characters, including Maude in this episode and the earlier episodes of the eleventh season, although the producers decided to kill her off to open up new storylines for the show. Executive producer Mike Scully said it "was a chance for one of our regular characters [Ned Flanders] to face a challenge and grow in a new direction. The idea came up quickly, we all latched on to it, and it just felt right. We didn't want to kill a character for the sake of killing. We wanted it to have consequences for surviving characters to deal with in future episodes." Roswell returned to The Simpsons in 2002 after reaching a deal with Fox to record her lines from her home in Denver. Since returning, she has voiced Maude in flashbacks and as a ghost. When asked by The Denver Post on how she thought Ned was doing without Maude, she replied: "OK. But Maude was such a vulnerable character. Maude and Lisa and Marge were the only vulnerable characters, really, everybody else has an edge. So they [the staff] discovered that arc was lost, and now there are a lot of flashbacks with Maude."

Scully has noted that "there was a lot of discussion about making sure we [the staff] did deal with some of the emotional ramifications of death [in the episode] and not just make it all joke, joke, joke. But at the same time, we're a comedy, they're animated, they're not real." In one of the first scripts for the episode there was a scene in which Rod and Todd discuss their mother's death. However, according to Maxtone-Graham, the writing staff decided to cut it because "it just never played anything but sad." He added that the writers "really wanted to address how [the children] would feel" but they "could never pull it off without it just being sad." Scully has commented that it was a "very sweet scene" but it was too difficult to "get out of it comedically to the next scene."

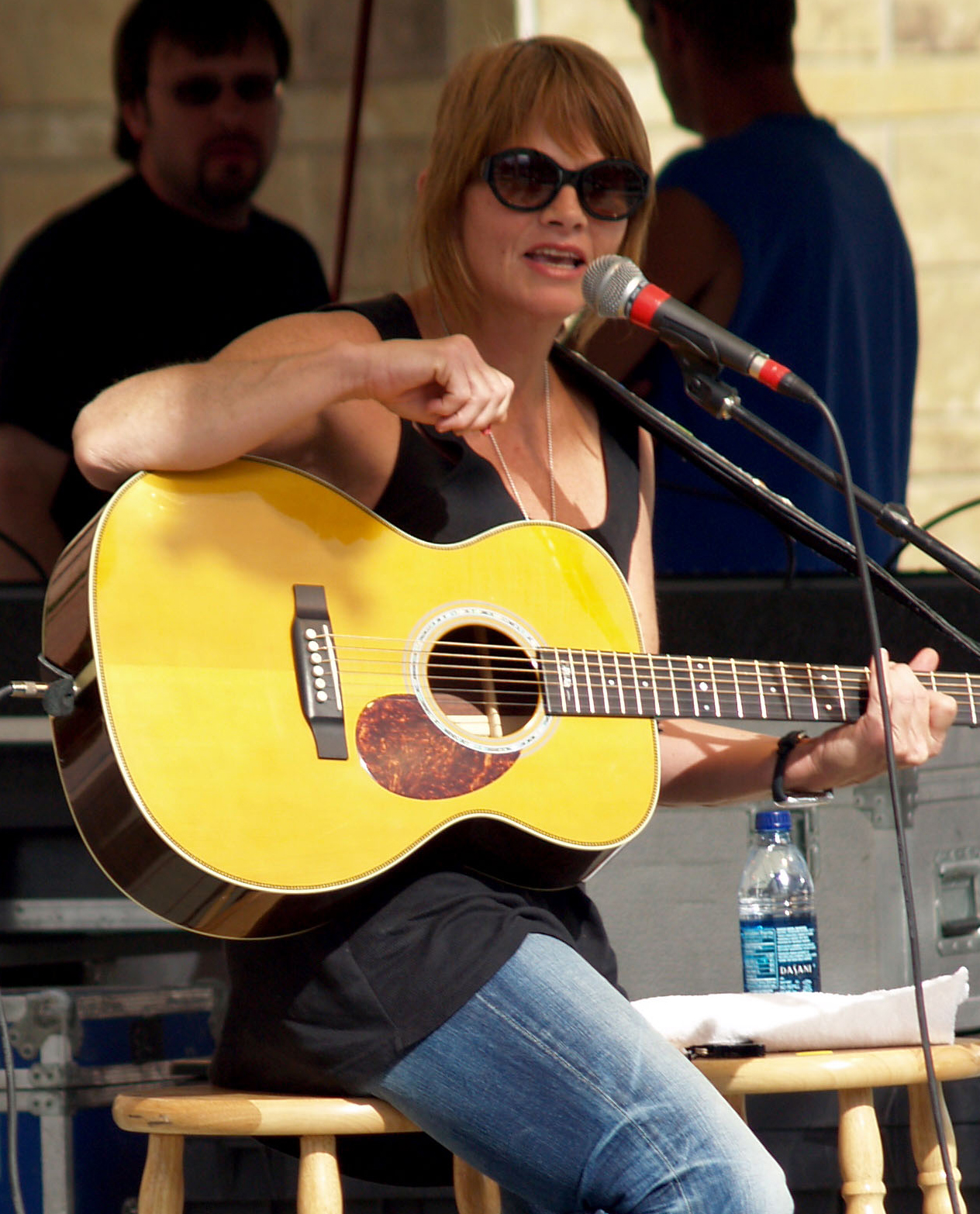
Shawn Colvin voices Rachel Jordan

American musician Shawn Colvin guest starred in the episode as Rachel Jordan, a character that she would later return to voice in the episode "I'm Goin' to Praiseland" (2001) from season twelve. In that episode, she stays at the Flanders' house with Ned, and leaves briefly after he attempted to mold her in the image of his deceased wife. At the end of the episode, however, she returns and has a date with him. Colvin told the Seattle Post-Intelligencer that being raised in Carbondale, Illinois meant she did not have to do much research for the guest appearance: "It's just very isolated [in Carbondale]. There was church music and that was about it. [...] I didn't have to dig too deep for the role. I suppose the whole 'Simpsons' thing is kind of like a hick town." Colvin has shown a segment of her guest role on The Simpsons during some of her concerts, including one at Cape Cod Melody Tent in 2007. She has also performed the song that she sings in "Alone Again, Natura-Diddily" in concert. The Wisconsin State Journal reported that during her 2001 concert at Barrymore Theatre, the "loudest audience response came after she sang a ditty that she performed as a character on The Simpsons." The song, called "He's the Man", later appeared on the 2007 soundtrack album The Simpsons: Testify.

== Broadcast and promotion ==
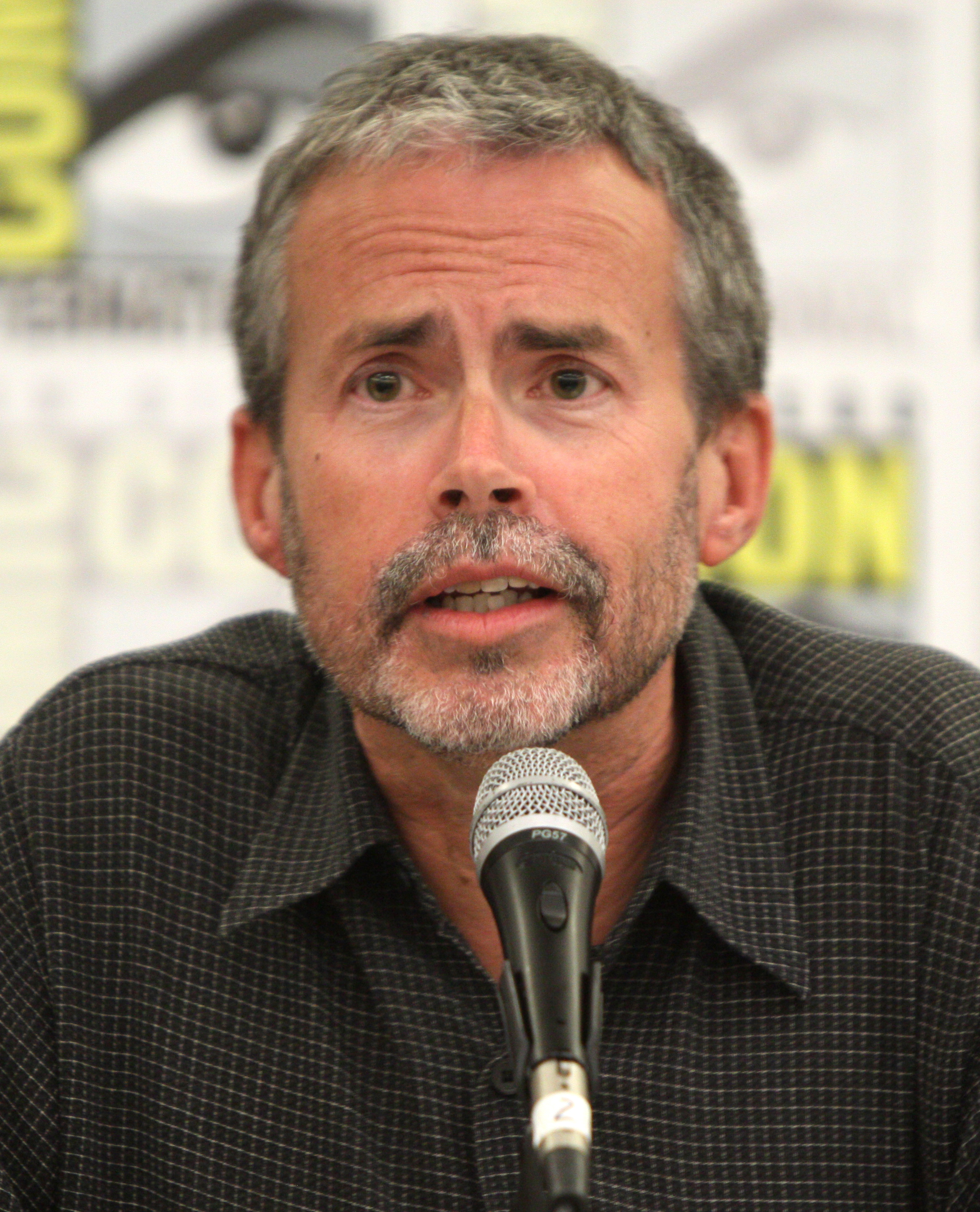
According to executive producer Mike Scully, one of the reasons for killing off Maude was to increase ratings.

The episode originally aired on the Fox network in the United States on February 13, 2000. It tied Dateline NBC for the 17th place (compared the season average of 37) in the ratings for the week of February 7–13, 2000, with a Nielsen rating of 10.7. The episode was the highest-rated show on Fox that week, and was viewed in approximately 10.8 million households.

Scully has admitted that another reason for killing off Maude was to increase ratings for The Simpsons during the February sweeps. To bring in even more viewers for the broadcast, the Simpsons producers chose not to reveal beforehand who the character that would be killed off was to create speculation. Fox also decided not to send out screener tapes to television critics to keep it a secret. However, according to an article in the Contra Costa Times that was published on the day the episode aired, "all the advance rumors suggest that Ned Flanders' wife, Maude, should watch her back." The revelation of the episode's title, "Alone Again, Natura-Diddly", was one of the reasons that the media and many people suspected Maude. As The Post-Standard's William LaRue writes, "diddly" is the "familiar greeting of Maude's husband, Ned Flanders." Roswell's announced departure strengthened this suspicion.

=== Reception of the promo in Charlotte ===
Before "Alone Again, Natura-Diddily" was broadcast, a promotional commercial aired on television that featured, among other things, the announcement that "one of Springfield's most beloved will die" and a snippet of a scene from the episode with the character Lenny, sitting in the speedway spectator stand, being hit by a car tire, giving the impression that he would be the one who would die. Many viewers of the commercial, including Speedway Motorsports, Inc. owned Lowe's Motor Speedway president and public address announcer Jerry Gappens, expressed their concern as it appeared the episode was parodying an actual incident that happened during a speedway race at Lowe's Motor Speedway in May 1999, in Charlotte, North Carolina, when flying debris in a crash killed three spectators. Gappens said that doing a parody of that was "a real insensitive thing to do, pretty irresponsible. Obviously what might appear funny in L.A. or New York isn't funny here in Charlotte." Lowe's Motor Speedway announced to WSOC-TV's Channel 9 Eyewitness News on February 7, 2000 that they were thinking of placing a complaint to the Fox Broadcasting Company. WCCB, the then-Fox affiliate in Charlotte, refused to continue showing the commercial for the episode. As a result, Fox distributed a new commercial to the affiliate on February 9 that did not contain the scene with Lenny.

Antonia Coffman, a spokeswoman for The Simpsons, told The Charlotte Observer that "the Lowe's incident didn't inspire the scene" and that the episode was not meant to offend anyone. After WCCB had gotten the opportunity to actually see the episode they decided that they would air it, realizing that the original commercial was misleading and that they did not think the episode was making fun of the incident. In the episode, the viewers can see that Lenny tries to get the attention of the cheerleaders by raising his hand so that they aim a T-shirt with the cannon at him. However, he is hit by a car tire instead. Unlike what the commercial implied, Lenny is not killed and is soon back in his seat. WCCB told the Associated Press that their interpretation of the scene was that someone threw the tire to Lenny because he was raising his hand, and that the tire did not actually come from a car crash on the track. Despite this, the affiliate announced that they would start the broadcast of the episode with a message warning viewers of the scene anyway.

== Critical response ==
The episode has received mixed reviews from television critics.

Gregory Hardy of the Orlando Sentinel placed it at number eleven on his list of the show's fifteen best episodes that target the world of sports.

Writing for IGN, Robert Canning gave the episode a 7 out of 10 rating, commenting that he thought the three acts felt disconnected. He wrote: "First Maude dies, then Ned dates and now Ned questions his faith. To me, these three storylines would have been better served had they been the focus of their own individual episodes." Canning added that he felt "the episode made a poor choice by rushing through the mourning period and moving right into Ned dating," but that "the dating stuff, while, again, feeling hurried, was quite funny, especially Ned's date with Edna Krabappel."

DVD Movie Guide's Colin Jacobson commented on the episode in a negative way, writing that it was "a harsh and cynical move [to kill off Maude because of Roswell's departure], though I could forgive the decision if it produced a more satisfying episode. Perhaps the writers made this one super-sincere to counteract the inherent cynicism behind its origins, but the show just seems sappy and lame."

Winnipeg Free Press columnist Randall King wrote in his review of the eleventh season of The Simpsons that there is "something undeniably funny about having Maude Flanders die by a barrage of T-shirts fired by air cannons at a speedway. But the episode Alone Again Natura-Diddily was proof that the dependably brilliant series could – and did – go seriously wrong when it turned 11. Killing off Maude was a sin [...]".
