= Marcia Marx =

American artist

Marcia Marx (1931–2005) was an American artist known for dark, satirical paintings, sculptures and lithographs.

== Early life ==
Marx was born to a prominent family in Newark, New Jersey. She counted Barbara Walters and Nancy Shevell as cousins, and her father ran the Clinton Milk Company. She studied painting at the Yale School of Art, and although her parents prevented from completing her studies, Marx moved to Mexico City, where she lived and worked for more than ten years.

== Style ==
As an artist, Marx worked in many media including painting, sculpture, lithograph printing, and screen printing. She purposely left interpretation open, stating, "No matter what I was thinking when I created it, the viewer writes his or her own script making it a far more intriguing experience." Marx frequently painted "Felliniesque characters and impressions" in her works, evidenced as her pieces "Hop Scotch" and "Musical Chairs". As a visual satirist, Marx’s works, paintings and sculptures, showed a sense of the ridiculous and an eye for the bizarre and comedic elements in the human experience.

== Career ==
While living in Mexico City, Marx had a "smash hit" one-person show at the Instituto Nacional de Bellas Artes, for which she was profiled in Time Magazine. She was also one of six artists featured Cosmopolitan's article "Women Artists Today, How Are They Doing vis a vis The Men", which also included Georgia O'Keeffe and Louise Nevelson.

Marx's major exhibitions included a retrospective at the Mexican Cultural Institute of New York in 2002 and in the solo show "An Interpretation of the Holocaust" at the Houston Holocaust Museum from October 2004-January 2005.

When it was confirmed that Marcia Marx’s works would be exhibited at the Houston Holocaust Museum, the museum’s executive director, Susan Llanes-Myers exclaimed, "We are so pleased to have Marcia Marx’s art at our museum. Her work strikingly portrays a sense of remembrance, a core of our mission." Art critic Donald Kuspit concurred, stating that her works "have a disturbing poignancy, not only because of their imagery but because of their intense physicality. Remembrance is Marx’s theme. Her works are saturated in memory... unsettling as well as consoling."

Marx died on May 3, 2005, in New York City, after a two-year battle with cancer. Her works continue to be exhibited around the world and are held in many private and public collections.

== Sources ==
- Portfolio MARCIA MARX. Artfocus Online.com.
