= Martian (disambiguation) =

As an adjective, Martian means of or pertaining to the planet Mars.

As a noun, a Martian is a hypothetical inhabitant, either alien or human, of the planet Mars.

Martian, Martians, The Martian or The Martians may also refer to:

== Arts and entertainment ==
- The Martian (Weir novel), a 2011 science fiction novel by Andy Weir
  - The Martian (film), a 2015 film directed by Ridley Scott, based on the Weir novel
- The Martian (du Maurier novel), an 1898 novel by George du Maurier
- Martian (The War of the Worlds), the invaders from H. G. Wells' 1898 novel The War of the Worlds and its adaptations and offshoots
- Marvin the Martian, a Warner Bros. cartoon character, first appearing in 1948
- John Jones/J'onn J'onzz, a DC Comics character who is referred to by various epithets including "the Martian Manhunter", the "Manhunter from Mars" or simply "the Martian", first appearing in 1955
- White Martians, an alien race from DC Comics who are largely enemies of the Martian Manhunter
- The Martian a.k.a. "Uncle Martin", a character in the 1963 television series, My Favorite Martian
- The Martians (1999 book), a collection of short stories supplementing the Mars trilogy by Kim Stanley Robinson
- The Martian (musician) (AKA Mike Banks, active from 1987), American record producer active in Detroit techno
- The Martians (band), a Scottish band formed in 2001
- The name used for the Martius family of ancient Rome in William Shakespeare's play Coriolanus
- In the 1992 book Men Are from Mars, Women Are from Venus the word Martian is used to symbolize men.
- Martian Xmas, a series of albums by Moka Only, released annually from 2007 to 2025

== Other uses ==
- The Martians (scientists), a group of scientists and other notable persons from Hungary, formed in the early half of the 20th century
- Martian Watches, a brand of American smart watch founded in 2007
- Martians, the mascot of Goodrich High School – see Goodrich Area Schools
- Martian packet, an IP packet with an invalid source or destination address
- Martian language, an orthographic dialect from China.
- An alternate spelling of Roman emperor Marcian

== See also ==
- Life on Mars
- Human mission to Mars
- Colonization of Mars
- Mars (disambiguation)
- Martia (disambiguation)
