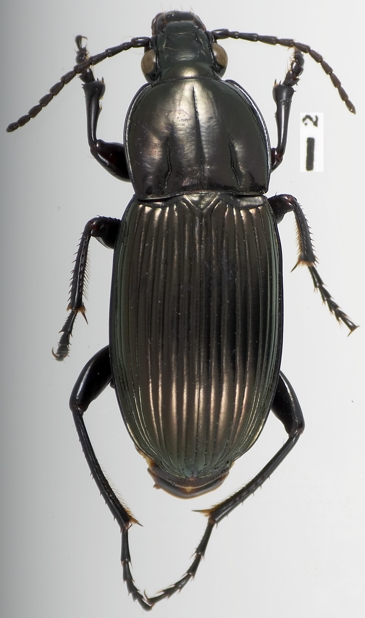
- Marsyas bicolor

Scientific classification
- Domain: Eukaryota
- Kingdom: Animalia
- Phylum: Arthropoda
- Class: Insecta
- Order: Coleoptera
- Suborder: Adephaga
- Family: Carabidae
- Tribe: Pterostichini
- Subtribe: Euchroina
- Genus: Marsyas; Putzeys, 1845

= Marsyas (beetle) =

Genus of beetles

Marsyas is a genus of beetles in the family Carabidae, found in South America.

== Species ==
These 19 species belong to the genus Marsyas:

- Marsyas bahiae Tschitscherine, 1900
- Marsyas bicolor Straneo, 1968
- Marsyas cyanopterus (Tschitscherine, 1897)
- Marsyas darlingtoni Straneo, 1985
- Marsyas elegans (Perty, 1830)
- Marsyas franzi Straneo, 1985
- Marsyas humeralis Straneo, 1968
- Marsyas inaequalis Straneo, 1968
- Marsyas insignis (Brulle, 1843)
- Marsyas intermedius Straneo, 1968
- Marsyas lampronotus Tschitscherine, 1901
- Marsyas latemarginatus Straneo, 1968
- Marsyas minutus Straneo, 1951
- Marsyas obliquecollis (Motschulsky, 1866)
- Marsyas olivaceus Straneo, 1968
- Marsyas parallelus (Perty, 1830)
- Marsyas proximus Straneo, 1953
- Marsyas subaeneus Straneo, 1968
- Marsyas viridiaeneus Chaudoir, 1874
