= Marcia Mitzman Gaven =

American actress

- Born: Marcia Mitzman; New York City, U.S.
- Education: State University of New York at Purchase
- Occupations: Actress, voice artist
- Years active: 1979–2020
- Spouse: Seth Gaven (m. 1996)
- Children: 2

Marcia Mitzman Gaven is an American actress from New York. Since studying at the High School of Performing Arts and the State University of New York at Purchase, she has appeared in many musicals during her career singing in both mezzo-soprano and soprano roles. Her Broadway debut came in 1979 when she played Betty Rizzo in Grease, serving as the replacement for the original actress of the Role, Adrienne Barbeau. In the 1980s she appeared in the musicals The Rocky Horror Show, Oliver!, Zorba, Nine, Anything Goes, Chess, and Welcome to the Club, Brigadoon, South Pacific, Sweeney Todd.

In 1992, Gaven played the character Mrs. Walker in a new production called The Who's Tommy at La Jolla Playhouse. The musical was a success, resulting in its move to Broadway in 1993. Gaven was praised by critics for her performance and received a Tony Award nomination in the "Best Featured Actress in a Musical" category. She eventually had to leave The Who's Tommy before its Broadway run ended because of an allergic reaction to a smoke effect used in the show. In 1995, she won an Ovation Award and a Los Angeles Drama Critics Circle Award for her portrayal of Florence Vassy in Chess at Hudson Theatre. She was also awarded an Ovation Award for the role of Mother in the staging of the musical Ragtime at Shubert Theatre in 1997. Gaven's latest role in a musical was in a 2001 production of 1776 by UCLA's Freud Playhouse. Since then she has appeared in concerts and fundraisers.

Gaven has also made guest star appearances in numerous television shows and films, playing both live-action and animated roles. She voiced several characters in the animated series The Simpsons from 1999 until 2002, including Maude Flanders, Helen Lovejoy, Miss Hoover, and others. She was hired after Maggie Roswell departed from the show, due to a pay dispute. She has not been heard on the show since Roswell's return in 2002. Gaven has also lent her voice to television and radio advertisements. She is currently married to Seth Gaven owner of AV Squad, a film marketing company. They have two children, Michael and Katherine.

== Early life ==
Gaven was born as Marcia Mitzman on February 28, 1959, in New York City. She was raised with her two siblings in the village of Hastings-on-Hudson, New York, by their mother Patricia Mitzman, who had previously had a career in art. Newt Mitzman, their father, directed television specials and commercials for a living. Gaven went to Hackley Elementary School in Tarrytown, New York, when she was young. At that time she was certain that she wanted to work in show business. As the result of a lie, she was able to study at the High School of Performing Arts even though the school was only open to inhabitants of New York City. She then became a drama major at the State University of New York at Purchase, though she did not get a degree. She said in a 1987 interview with The New York Times that "they kicked me out because I missed a major rehearsal", and she never applied for readmission since she had already made her first appearance on Broadway in Grease by then. While at Purchase, Gaven performed in student productions such as The Taming of the Shrew and Trumpets and Drums.

== Career in theatre ==
Gaven has had a prominent career in musical theatre and has appeared in many rock musicals. She told TheaterWeek in 1993 that she thinks those kinds of musicals are harder to sing in compared to standard musicals, and that "the nature of rock and roll is that it's on the edge. It's written to be done dangerously. You can't be careful and do it at the same time. If you don't do it dangerously, you run the risk of losing the impact." During her career, Gaven has sung in both mezzo-soprano and soprano roles, and has been cited for her belting. According to Alvin Klein, theatre critic for The New York Times, she "is categorically a mezzo soprano." Gaven has also been noted for her strong voice, and was once told by a sound technician at An Evening Dinner Theater in Elmsford, New York, that "We always turn off the mikes when you sing" because she did not need amplification.

=== 1979–1989 ===
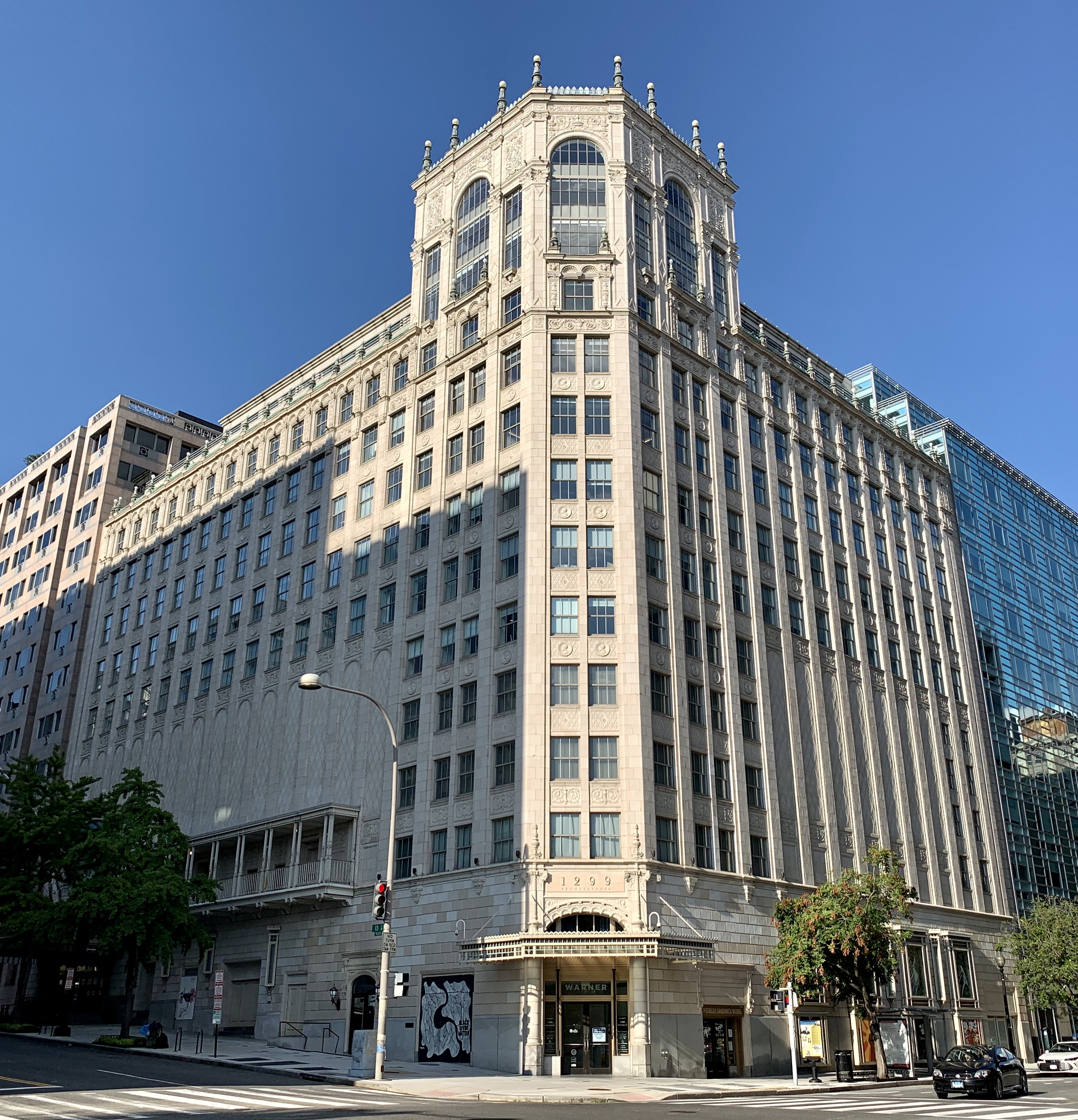
In 1980, Gaven starred in one of her first big productions: The Rocky Horror Show at Warner Theatre

In March 1979, when Gaven was twenty years old, she served as the replacement actress for the character Betty Rizzo in the original Broadway production of Grease. This was her Broadway debut. In late 1980, she was cast in the lead role of Janet in the musical The Rocky Horror Show that ran for six nights at Warner Theatre. It tells the story of a couple, Brad and Janet, who find themselves lost one night and end up in the laboratory of an alien doctor. The cast, including Gaven, was praised by critics. In 1984, she played a Londoner in the revival of Oliver! at Broadway and was the understudy to Patti LuPone's Nancy. That same year, in the Broadway revival of Zorba, Gaven played the role of The Widow who is eventually stoned to death by the townspeople after being held responsible for the suicide of a young boy who fell in love with her. She then portrayed the character Luisa, the wife of an Italian film director, in a production of Nine at An Evening Dinner Theater in 1985.

Gaven starred in the New York City Opera's Broadway revival of Brigadoon, in which she played Meg Brockie, at New York State Theater in 1986. The story is about a mysterious Scottish village that appears for only one day every hundred years, and Meg is one of the villagers. According to Sy Syna of the magazine The World & I, Gaven was "a huge crowd pleaser" in the role. She was also cast in the New York City Opera's spring 1987 revival of South Pacific as the female lead character Nellie Forbush, a U.S. Navy nurse who works on a South Pacific island during World War II. This nine-week run of South Pacific had an alternating cast and Nellie was also portrayed by Susan Bigelow. Later that year in July during the New York City Opera's regular season, she appeared in the opera company's Sweeney Todd as Mrs. Lovett, who makes and sells meat pies made from the victims of serial killer Sweeney Todd.

In Pioneer Theatre Company's fall 1988 production of Anything Goes, Gaven played the lead role of nightclub singer Reno Sweeney. It is set on an ocean liner on which Reno helps the character Billy Crocker win the heart of the engaged Hope Harcourt who he has fallen in love with. While reviewing the musical for the Deseret News, Joseph Walker commented that Gaven "is sensational as Reno Sweeney, the saucy, sassy hoofer-with-a-heart-of-gold. She has an arresting presence and a golden voice; the whole show always seems better when she's on stage." At the end of 1988, Gaven returned to the musical Oliver! in a Theatre Under The Stars production in Houston, starring as Nancy. A critic for the Houston Chronicle commended her performance, writing that she "acts the compassionate Nancy with warmth and spirit, and sings in a strong voice full of character."

Also in 1988, Gaven played the part of the Russian chess player's wife Svetlana in the short-lived Broadway production of the musical Chess, for which she was praised by critics. The following year she appeared as Carol Bates in the Broadway musical Welcome to the Club. It revolves around four men who have been put in jail for not paying alimony. The musical shows why they ended up divorcing their wives, one of which is played by Gaven. Both Chess and Welcome to the Club were unsuccessful. John Simon criticized the latter musical in a New York Magazine review but praised Gaven's performance, writing: "The cast ranges from the charmless to the hopeless [...] in this mess. Only Marcia Mitzman manages to stand out from the crowd, and when she gets the right part in the right show, she'll do just fine." Associated Press drama critic Michael Kuchwara also wrote negatively about Welcome to the Club while giving praise to Gaven for projecting "a sympathy [to her character] that isn't apparent in the book."

=== 1990–1995 ===
In December 1990, Gaven once again appeared as Nancy in a revival of Oliver!—this time in a production at 5th Avenue Theatre in Seattle, Washington. A theatre critic for the Seattle Post-Intelligencer noted that she "has the voice to anchor anything you'd care to name, even the 5th Avenue Theatre. 5th Avenue performers often sound as if they were speaking and singing through a football stadium public address system. But Mitzman overpowers malevolent acoustics." After Oliver!, she appeared as Countess Charlotte Malcolm in Ahmanson Theatre's production of A Little Night Music that was performed from April 18 to June 30, 1991, at James A. Doolittle Theatre in Los Angeles, California. Gaven worked at 5th Avenue Theatre again in December 1991 in the musical Here's Love. She portrayed the divorced Doris Walker, a single-working mother of a girl who doubts the existence of Santa Claus. During spring 1992, she played the love interest of a male songwriter and his best friend in the musical The Tin Pan Man (set in 1905) at La Mirada Theatre for the Performing Arts.

Starting at the beginning of July 1992, Gaven appeared in a new musical called The Who's Tommy at La Jolla Playhouse in San Diego. It was based on the rock opera album Tommy by The Who. Gaven starred as Mrs. Walker, the mother of the boy Tommy who is traumatized when he sees his father murder Mrs. Walker's new boyfriend. Tommy ultimately becomes non-responsive, leading people to believe that he is deaf, mute, and blind, and his parents try to find a cure for his condition. Gaven later told TheaterWeek that she initially did not want to do the musical, since she "had no idea how this could be staged as a theatrical piece. I hoped my agents wouldn't call me and ask me to audition." However, they did, and she was cast as Mrs. Walker after an audition in which she sang the song "Heaven Help My Heart" that she performed in Chess, also a rock musical. The Who's Tommy was La Jolla Playhouse's biggest success yet and as a result its run was lengthened by several weeks. Later that year, Gaven once again played Doris in Here's Love—this time in a Theatre Under The Stars production.

In late 1992 it was announced that because of the success of The Who's Tommy, it would be produced for Broadway and open in April 1993. The production cost eight million dollars and it broke the box office record for the biggest non-opening day with US$494,897 earned on April 23, 1993, at St. James Theatre (where the musical opened on April 22), beating Guys and Dolls' 1992 record. Des McAnuff, who directed the musical at both La Jolla Playhouse and on Broadway, decided to bring many actors from the original cast with him despite weeks of auditions with thousands of actors trying out for the roles in front of him. The Broadway production featured some changes to the musical, such as a new song devoted to Tommy's parents that Gaven thought "helps show their side of the story." However, as she told The San Diego Union-Tribune, the biggest difference was the increased amount of money she earned. Gaven was praised by critics for her portrayal of Mrs. Walker in the Broadway production, with one critic from The Miami Herald writing that her "alluring alto voice makes you wish Tommy's mother had even more to sing."

It was announced on May 10, 1993, that The Who's Tommy had received eleven Tony Award nominations, tying with Kiss of the Spider Woman for the most nominations that year. Gaven received a nomination in the "Best Featured Actress in a Musical" category. However, as the result of an allergic reaction, she could not perform in the musical some nights. When Daryl Miller interviewed Gaven in the Los Angeles Times in 1997, he noted that "this was one of the biggest disappointments of her life, and clouds cross her face for the first time in the conversation. She glances across the room at the Tony citation—recognizing her nomination for best featured actress in a musical—as she describes how her throat became infected due to a reaction to the oil in a haze-making compound that designers pump onstage to enhance lighting effects. She missed a lot of performances, and an untold number of Tony voters missed her performance. She can't help but wonder how that affected the outcome." At one point, Gaven's understudy Alice Ripley took her place for eight consecutive weeks while Gaven recovered. Gaven eventually had to leave The Who's Tommy some months after it opened because of her allergy. She also disliked the idea of performing in one musical for more than a year.

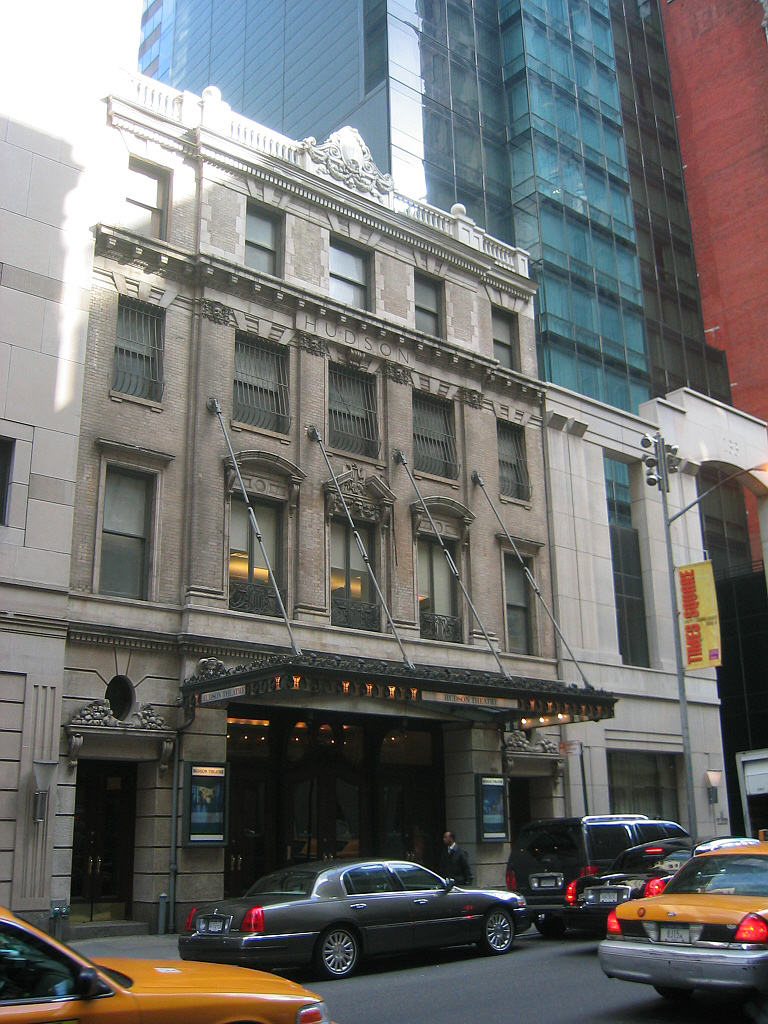
Gaven won awards for her 1995 role in Chess at Hudson Theatre

In late 1993, she was cast in Pasadena Playhouse's musical Sweet, Smart, Rodgers & Hart that featured music and lyrics previously written by Richard Rodgers and Lorenz Hart. It originally played from the middle of November to December 17, 1993, but was then extended for another run between January 6 and January 23, 1994. In July 1994, Gaven played the role of the partly African-American showboat actress Julie Dozier in Music Circus' adaptation of Show Boat in California. In the spring of the following year, she reprised her part as the Countess in a production of A Little Night Music, also by Music Circus. Gaven returned to Chess in the summer of 1995 in small-scale production at Hudson Theatre, this time as the lead character Florence Vassy. The story involves a romantic triangle between the two top players, an American and a Russian, in a world chess championship, and the woman Florence who manages one and falls in love with the other. Gaven received an Ovation Award (Best Lead Actress in a Musical) and a Los Angeles Drama Critics Circle Award (Best Lead Performance) for her work in the musical.

=== 1996 ===
On May 21, 1996, Gaven and seventeen other well-known musical theatre artists appeared in the show Say It With Music at Carpenter Performing Arts Center. It was staged to raise proceeds for the Musical Theatre Group, which was described by John Woolard of the Press-Telegram as "a new organization formed to help rejuvenate musical theater in Southern California." The show was made up of singing and dancing numbers that had previously appeared in different Broadway musicals. From June to September 1997, Gaven played the role of Mother in the Los Angeles production (pre-Broadway) of the musical Ragtime at Shubert Theatre. She received her second Ovation Award (Best Lead Actress in a Musical) for this performance. The musical tells the story of three ethnic groups in the United States: White Anglo-Saxon Protestants, African-Americans in Harlem, and European immigrants. Gaven played the mother and matriarch of the Protestant family. Ragtime director Frank Galati praised her in the Los Angeles Times for her "grace and beauty and magnificent voice" and her "extraordinarily keen intelligence—she's a very deep reader of text," and commented that "she seizes the stage with energy." Many critics praised Gaven as well, though Laurie Winer of the Los Angeles Times wrote that she played Mother "valiantly but with a shade too much effort." David Littlejohn of The Wall Street Journal cited her as "the best single performance in this production."

In May of the following year, she appeared in California Musical Theatre's production of Triumph of Love, a musical that had previously been staged on Broadway and is set in Sparta. It ran for six days at the Community Center Theater in Sacramento, California, and featured Gaven in the role of the philosopher Hesione. In 2001, Gaven reappeared as Julie Dozier in another adaptation of Show Boat by Music Circus. Davis Enterprise critic Bev Sykes wrote positively about her voice but criticized her performance for not being credible, writing: "Marcia Mitzman Gaven gives an uneven performance as Julie, a singer of mixed race who passes for white until she's betrayed by a spurned suitor. She is re-discovered in Act 2, having fallen into decline. Though obviously under the influence of the liquor in the bottle she carries around before and after her delivery of the song 'He's Just My Bill,' the song itself is performed straight, with no hint of the ravages that alcohol have taken on her body and voice." Later that same year she played the role of Abigail Adams in a production of 1776 by UCLA's Freud Playhouse.

Gaven performed in a cabaret, called The Girly Show, at a fundraising gala for the Blank Theatre Company on August 15, 2005. It consisted of an all-female cast singing songs by Michael John LaChiusa, with LaChiusa playing the piano. On December 15, 2008, celebrating the fifteenth anniversary of The Who's Tommy, Gaven and the rest of the original Broadway cast reunited for a concert at August Wilson Theatre in New York City. This performance was a benefit for Broadway Cares/Equity Fights AIDS, the Broadway Dreams Foundation, and the Bachmann-Strauss Dystonia & Parkinson Foundation.

== Career in television and film ==
Gaven has done much voice acting in her career, lending her voice to television and radio advertisements and playing animated characters in The Pink Panther (1993), Red Planet (1994), and Small Soldiers (1998). Working with advertisements earned Gaven more money than playing theatre. "I can make in an hour what I make in a week doing theater," she said in 1997. Gaven has also made guest star appearances in live-action television series such as The George Carlin Show (1994), Ellen (1995), Get Smart (1995), The Drew Carey Show (1996), Hangin' with Mr. Cooper (1997), Frasier (1998), and Beverly Hills, 90210 (1998). In addition, she had a minor role in the 2002 film Moonlight Mile.

When Maggie Roswell left the animated series The Simpsons in spring 1999 after a pay dispute with Fox Broadcasting Company, Gaven was hired to fill in for Roswell's characters. These characters included Maude Flanders, Helen Lovejoy, Miss Hoover, and others. However, Maude Flanders was killed off in the 2000 episode "Alone Again, Natura-Diddily" to open up new storylines for the show. Maggie Roswell returned to The Simpsons in 2002 after reaching a deal with Fox to record her lines from her home, and Gaven has not worked for the show since that year.

== Personal life ==
Gaven resided in Los Angeles from 1991 to 1993, when she had to move to New York City to act in The Who's Tommy. However, her stay in the city was short because of the allergic reaction and she moved back to Los Angeles. While performing in musicals, Gaven had to be protective of her vocal cords and this affected her personal life. She told Miller in 1997 that "you have to give up so much of your life", and gave the example that when "somebody coughs behind me [at the cinema] I immediately say to my husband, 'We may have to move.'" She also had to avoid shouting. Gaven is currently married to Seth Gaven who owns AV Squad, a film marketing company.

== Acting credits ==
=== Theatre ===
Year	Title	Role(s)	Ref.
1979	Grease	Betty Rizzo (replacement)	
1980	The Rocky Horror Show	Janet	
1984	Oliver!	Londoner, Nancy (understudy)	
1984	Zorba	The Widow	
1985	Nine	Luisa	
1986	Brigadoon	Meg Brockie	
1987	South Pacific	Nellie Forbush	
1987	Sweeney Todd	Mrs. Lovett	
1988	Anything Goes	Reno Sweeney	
1988	Oliver!	Nancy	
1988	Chess	Svetlana	
1989	Welcome to the Club	Carol Bates	
1990	Oliver!	Nancy	
1991	A Little Night Music	Countess Charlotte Malcolm	
1991	Here's Love	Doris Walker	
1992	The Tin Pan Man	Margie	
1992	The Who's Tommy	Mrs. Walker	
1992	Here's Love	Doris Walker	
1993	The Who's Tommy	Mrs. Walker	
1993	Sweet, Smart, Rodgers & Hart	Lead singer	
1994	Show Boat	Julie Dozier	
1995	A Little Night Music	Countess Charlotte Malcolm	
1995	Chess	Florence Vassy	
1997	Ragtime	Mother	
2000	Triumph of Love	Hesione	
2001	Show Boat	Julie Dozier	
2001	1776	Abigail Adams	

=== Television ===
Year(s)	Title	Role(s)	Notes	Ref.
1993	The Pink Panther	Additional voices	Several episodes	
1994	Red Planet	Voice of Dr. Jane Marlowe	Miniseries	
1994	The George Carlin Show	Ellen	Episode: "George Really Does It This Time"	
1995	Ellen	Debby	Episode: "The Apartment Hunt"	
1995	Get Smart	KAOS chairwoman	Several episodes	
1996	The Drew Carey Show	Kim	Episode: "Drew's New Assistant"	
1997	Babylon 5	Commander Sandra Levitt	Episode: "No Surrender, No Retreat"	
1997	Hangin' with Mr. Cooper	Clerk	Episode: "The Ring"	
1998	Frasier	Allison	Episode: "Party, Party"	
1998	Beverly Hills, 90210	Judge	Episode: "Don't Ask, Don't Tell"	
1999–2002	The Simpsons	Voice of Maude Flanders, Helen Lovejoy, Miss Hoover, and others	Several episodes	

=== Film ===
Year	Title	Role(s)	Ref.
1998	Small Soldiers	Voice of Globotech Announcer	
2002	Moonlight Mile	Fashion Plate	

=== Video Games ===
Year	Title	Role(s)	Ref.
1993	Leisure Suit Larry 6: Shape Up or Slip Out!	Burgundy Bodine	
