= Take My Wife, Sleaze =

- The Simpsons episode
- Episode no.: Season 11; Episode 8
- Directed by: Neil Affleck
- Written by: John Swartzwelder
- Production code: BABF05
- Original air date: November 28, 1999

Guest appearances
- John Goodman as Meathook; Henry Winkler as Ramrod; Jay North as himself; NRBQ as themselves; Jan Hooks as Manjula Nahasapeemapetilon

Episode features
- Chalkboard gag: "I can't see dead people"
- Couch gag: The Simpsons sit on the couch, but get sucked inside and come out on shredded paper.
- Commentary: Mike Scully; George Meyer; Ian Maxtone-Graham; Julie Thacker; Dan Castellaneta; Neil Affleck

Episode chronology
← Previous "Eight Misbehavin'"	Next → "Grift of the Magi"
- The Simpsons season 11

"Take My Wife, Sleaze" is the eighth episode of the eleventh season of the American animated television series The Simpsons. It originally aired on the Fox network in the United States on November 28, 1999. In the episode, Homer wins a Harley-Davidson motorcycle and starts his own outlaw motorcycle club, naming it "Hell's Satans". However, this attracts the real club called "Hell's Satans" to crash at their house. After a while, they begin to appreciate Marge, who takes care of them, and kidnap her. Homer tracks them down and scuffles with Meathook, the leader of the gang. The episode was written by John Swartzwelder and directed by Neil Affleck, and features several guest appearances.

== Plot ==
The family visit a 50s-style diner where Homer and Marge win a dancing contest. Their prize is a vintage Harley-Davidson motorcycle. Bart teaches his father how to ride it, and he then rides it everywhere — into the school, the church, and the bedroom. He forms an outlaw motorcycle club named the Hell's Satans. Its members are: Moe, riding an old motorcycle; Carl, riding a Vespa; Ned Flanders, riding a bicycle; and Lenny, riding a lawnmower. They assert themselves all over Springfield. But Homer is then confronted by a real motorcycle gang with the same name; they force him to eat all his apparel on which their name is marked; and they take over the Simpsons' home.

They trash the place, but Marge cleans up and takes good care of them; when they leave, they take her with them. They assure her she is safe because none of them find her sexually attractive, which she hears with mixed feelings. She is a good influence, and persuades them to give up violence and find proper jobs. But Homer tracks them down, fights with their leader, and wins her back. On the way home, he goes into a biker bar where he had been beaten up, and comes out with a Duff keg.

== Production and themes ==
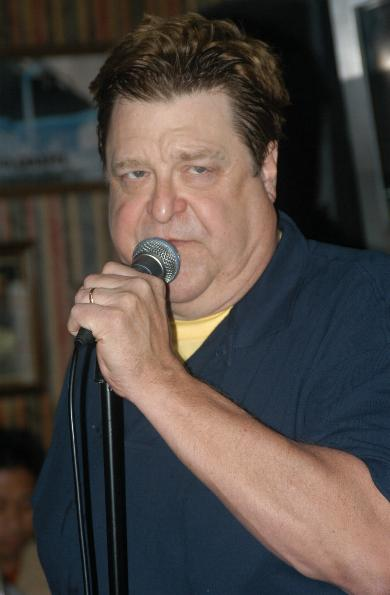
John Goodman voiced the character Meathook in the episode.

"Take My Wife, Sleaze" was written by John Swartzwelder and directed by Neil Affleck as part of the eleventh season of The Simpsons (1999–2000). Guest starring in the episode were John Goodman as Meathook, Henry Winkler as Ramrod, Jay North as himself, NRBQ as themselves, and Jan Hooks as Manjula. NRBQ drummer Tom Ardolino said in an interview before "Take My Wife, Sleaze" aired that the band's appearance is "real quick. We're in a bar that Homer goes in looking for Marge. We're the band playing in the bar." Bass player Joey Spampinato commented, "We got to sit around the table when they read the script and it was pretty funny stuff." In addition to appearing in the episode, NRBQ performed the Simpsons theme music over the closing credits. Executive producer Mike Scully considers NRBQ to be one of his favorite bands, and their songs had already been used in three episodes of the show that aired not long before this episode was produced.

The name of Homer's gang, the Hell's Satans, is a reference to the real-life motorcycle gang and organized crime syndicate Hells Angels. Authors Paul Broughton and Linda Walker analyzed the episode in their 2009 book Motorcycling and Leisure: Understanding the Recreational PTW Rider, writing: "This episode feeds on the stereotypical image of riders, for example, Homer says: 'Yeah, that's the life for me, Marge. Cruising and hassling shopkeepers.' The outlaw image is further reinforced within this episode when another group of bikers, also called the Hell's Satans, take offence at Homer using the name. This gang act in a stereotypical gang manner, wrecking Homer's house and kidnapping his wife. The fact that an iconic cartoon series can use such stereotypical images of riders to good effect demonstrates how much the negative rider image is ingrained within society."

Other references to popular culture include to the 1938 film The Adventures of Robin Hood. Homer's motorcycle sword fight with Meathook parodies the ending sword fight between Robin and Guy of Gisbourne in the film. Wolfguy Jack is a parody of radio host Wolfman Jack; his girlfriend resembles Debbie from the film American Graffiti. When Apu shoos Homer from the Kwik-E-Mart with a broom, he and Manjula adopt a stance reminiscent of Grant Wood’s painting, American Gothic. The title is a play on the words "Take my wife...please." associated with Henny Youngman.

== Release ==
The episode originally aired on the Fox network in the United States on November 28, 1999. On October 7, 2008, it was released on DVD as part of the box set The Simpsons – The Complete Eleventh Season. Staff members Mike Scully, George Meyer, Ian Maxtone-Graham, Julia Thacker, Dan Castellaneta, and Neil Affleck participated in the DVD audio commentary for the episode. Deleted scenes from the episode were also included on the box set.

While reviewing the eleventh season of The Simpsons, DVD Movie Guide's Colin Jacobson commented: "Should we blame ['Take My Wife, Sleaze'] for the movie Wild Hogs? Maybe not, but the episode doesn’t do a lot to rise above the level of that John Travolta mediocrity. I like guest stars Henry Winkler and John Goodman, so the episode’s not a loss, but it’s not a winner either."
