= Eight Misbehavin' =

- The Simpsons episode
- Episode no.: Season 11; Episode 7
- Directed by: Steven Dean Moore
- Written by: Matt Selman
- Production code: BABF03
- Original air date: November 21, 1999

Guest appearances
- Jan Hooks as Manjula Nahasapeemapetilon; Garry Marshall as Larry Kidkill; Butch Patrick as himself

Episode features
- Chalkboard gag: "Indian burns are not our cultural heritage" (recycled from "King-Size Homer")
- Couch gag: The Simpsons sit on the couch and the wall spins around revealing Vincent Price and a scared Ned Flanders, shackled upside down.
- Commentary: Mike Scully; George Meyer; Matt Selman; Julie Thacker; Garry Marshall; Steven Dean Moore

Episode chronology
← Previous "Hello Gutter, Hello Fadder"	Next → "Take My Wife, Sleaze"
- The Simpsons season 11

"Eight Misbehavin'" is the seventh episode of the eleventh season of the American animated television series The Simpsons. It originally aired on the Fox network in the United States on November 21, 1999. In the episode, after Manjula gives birth to octuplets that were the result of fertility drugs, she and Apu unintentionally allow a zookeeper to exploit their babies in exchange for help raising them.

Reception of the episode from television critics has been mixed.

== Plot ==
The family visits Shøp, a parody of IKEA, and run into Apu and Manjula. Manjula is entranced by Maggie and the couple decide to have a baby. With the help of fertility drugs, Manjula gives birth to octuplets. This makes headlines across Springfield, with local companies giving the Nahasapeemapetilons free products. However, when nonuplets are born to a family in Shelbyville, the donors redirect the gifts to them instead. The stress of raising eight children at once soon leaves Apu and Manjula exhausted and short of money.

The owner of Springfield Zoo, Larry Kidkill, offers to help if the parents sign a contract permitting him to display the children. They reluctantly agree, but discover that he is going to use their children in a show called "Octopia" several times a day. Apu wants to liberate them, but Kidkill will not allow him to break the contract, and Chief Wiggum refuses to help having been bribed by Kidkill with free peanuts. Apu and Homer sneak into the zoo at night and steal the babies back.

They rush the octuplets to the Simpson household but Kidkill tracks them down. Homer makes a deal with Kidkill: he will perform instead of the octuplets. He rides a tricycle with Butch Patrick on his shoulders, both dressed as Eddie Munster, among venomous cobras. Onstage, Homer and Patrick are mercilessly attacked by cobras and by a mongoose put in to contain them.

== Production and themes ==
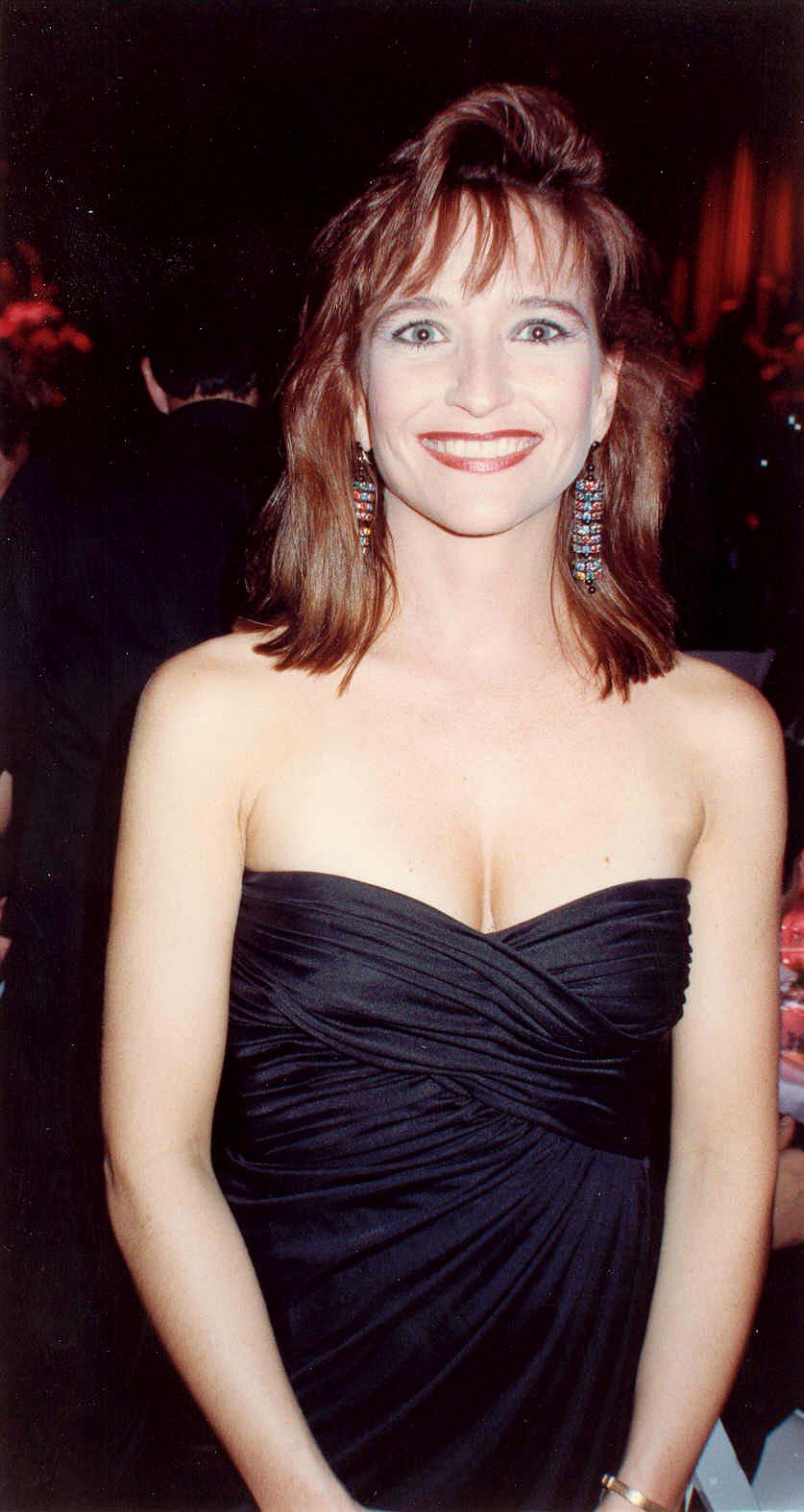
Actress Jan Hooks voiced Manjula in the episode.

"Eight Misbehavin'" was written by Matt Selman and directed by Steven Dean Moore as part of the eleventh season of The Simpsons (1999–2000). Guest starring in the episode were Jan Hooks (as Manjula), Garry Marshall (as Larry Kidkill), and Butch Patrick (as himself). According to Jonathan Gray in his 2006 book Watching with The Simpsons: Television, Parody, and Intertextuality, the episode makes fun of the "conflation of real time and occasional predilection for time jumps" often seen in sitcoms. He further noted that in "Eight Misbehavin", "in order to fit a character's pregnancy into one episode, we skip nine months." Gray wrote in his book that "Here, we are treated to a parody not only of how awkwardly time jumps are proposed, but also of how ultimately irrelevant any sitcom time is — nothing really changes, after all — and finally, of the sort of plots that traditionally fill sitcom time." The title "Eight Misbehavin'" is a reference to the song Ain't Misbehavin', by Fats Waller.

== Cultural references ==
Several references to popular culture are featured in the episode. The episode's plot is loosely based on the life of the Dionne quintuplets. The store Shøp is a parody of the Swedish furniture business IKEA, and the name is a reference to the similar business STØR. The songs played during "Octopia" are "Drop a Beat" by Moby, "Welcome to the Jungle" by Guns N' Roses, Ride of the Valkyries by Richard Wagner and "R.O.C.K. in the U.S.A." by John Mellencamp. Homer's act is set to the song "Danger Zone" by Kenny Loggins. In the octuplets room there is a picture of the character Babar the Elephant dressed as former Prime Minister of India Jawaharlal Nehru.

== Release and legacy ==
"Eight Misbehavin'" originally aired on the Fox network in the United States on November 21, 1999. On October 7, 2008, it was released on DVD as part of the box set The Simpsons – The Complete Eleventh Season. Staff members Mike Scully, George Meyer, Matt Selman, Julia Thacker, and Steven Dean Moore participated in the DVD audio commentary for the episode, as well as guest voice Garry Marshall. Deleted scenes and concept drawings from the episode were also included on the box set.

The episode has received mixed reviews from critics.

While reviewing the eleventh season of The Simpsons, DVD Movie Guide's Colin Jacobson commented that "With such a silly concept, [the episode] probably should flop. However, it actually works pretty well. The best moments come from those that feature the kids at the zoo, but a mix of other amusing scenes emerge. Though the show often threatens to falter, it usually succeeds."

Nancy Basile of About.com, on the other hand, listed the episode as one of the worst episodes of the season—the episodes that "made me cringe because they included blatant gimmicks and outlandish plots".

The episode has become study material for sociology courses at University of California Berkeley, where it is used to figure out what it is "trying to tell audiences about aspects primarily of American society, and, to a lesser extent, about other societies."

Homer's quote "Kids are the best, Apu. You can teach them to hate the things you hate. And they practically raise themselves, what with the Internet and all", entered The Oxford Dictionary of Modern Quotations in August 2007.

== See also ==
- Aunt Misbehavin', 9th episode of the 37th season of The Simpsons
