= The Simpsons season 11 =

Season of television series

The Simpsons
- Season 11
- DVD cover featuring Krusty the Clown
- Showrunners: Mike Scully; George Meyer (2 episodes); Al Jean (2 episodes)
- No. of episodes: 22

Release
- Original network: Fox
- Original release: September 26, 1999 – May 21, 2000

Season chronology
- ← Previous; Season 10 Next → Season 12

The eleventh season of the American animated sitcom The Simpsons aired on Fox between September 26, 1999, and May 21, 2000. It started with "Beyond Blunderdome" and ended with "Behind the Laughter". With Mike Scully as the showrunner for the eleventh season, it has twenty-two episodes, including four hold-over episodes from the season 10 production line. Season 11 was released on DVD in Region 1 (North America), on October 7, 2008, with both a standard box and Krusty-molded plastic cover.

The season coincided with The Simpsons family being awarded their star on Hollywood's Walk of Fame, the season receiving itself an Emmy Award for Outstanding Animated Program, an Annie Award, and a British Comedy Award. It also saw the departure of voice actress Maggie Roswell. The Simpsons ranked 41st in the season ratings with an average U.S. viewership of 8.8 million viewers, making it the second highest rated show on Fox after Malcolm in the Middle. It got an 18-49 Nielsen Rating of 8.2/13.

== Production ==
Towards the end of the production of season 10, voice actress Maggie Roswell, who voiced Helen Lovejoy, Maude Flanders and Miss Hoover, among others, left the show because of a contract dispute She returned to the show in season 14. As a result of Roswell's leaving, Marcia Mitzman Gaven was brought to voice many of her characters, but it was decided to kill off Maude Flanders in the episode "Alone Again, Natura-Diddily" to open new storylines for that episode. Gaven started voicing Roswell's characters in hold-over season 10 episode "Brother's Little Helper".

Writers credited with episodes in the 11th season include Al Jean, Dan Greaney, Donick Cary, Tim Long, Ian Maxtone-Graham, Carolyn Omine, Mike Scully, Matt Selman, John Swartzwelder and George Meyer. Animation directors included Bob Anderson, Mike B. Anderson, Mark Kirkland, Lance Kramer, Nancy Kruse, Lauren MacMullan, Pete Michels, Steven Dean Moore, Matthew Nastuk, Michael Polcino and Jim Reardon.

== Voice cast & characters ==
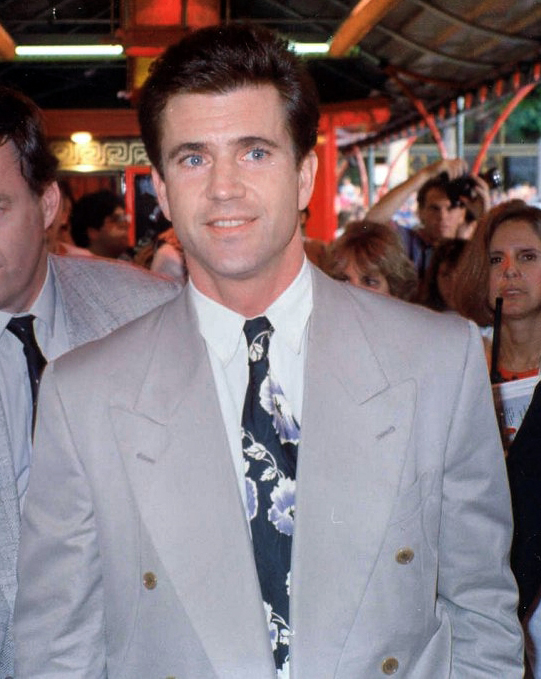
Mel Gibson guest starred as himself in "Beyond Blunderdome"

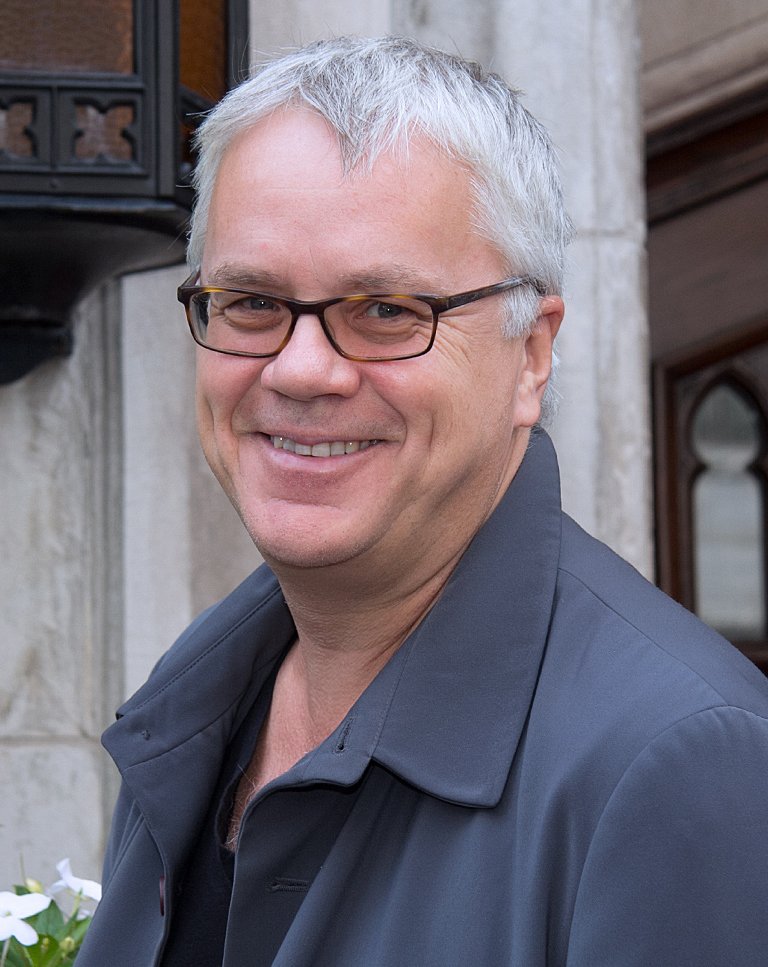
Tim Robbins guest starred in "Grift of the Magi" as Jim Hope

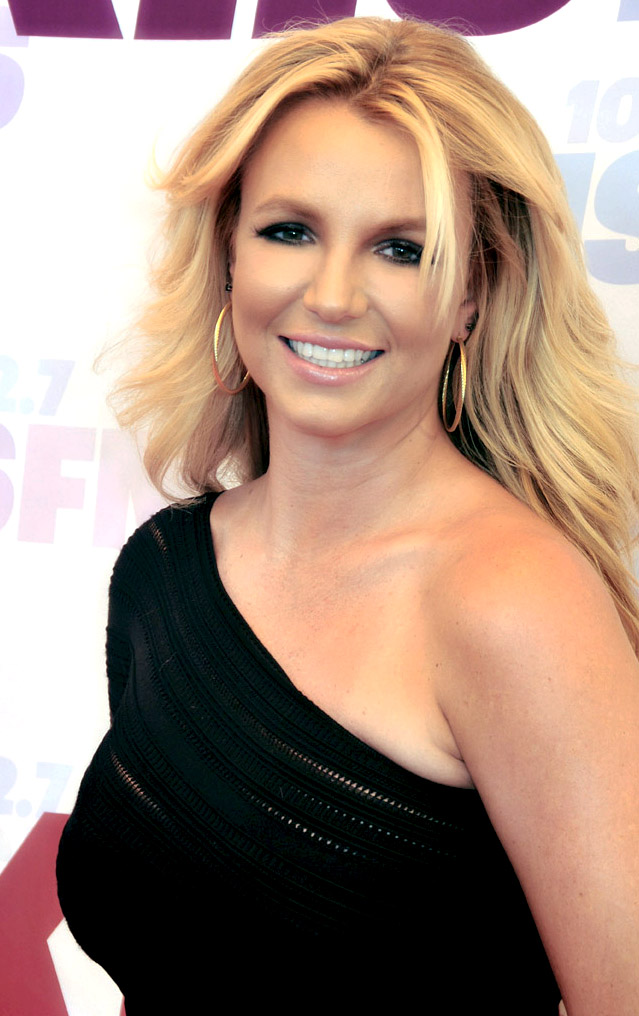
Britney Spears made a guest appearance as herself in "The Mansion Family"

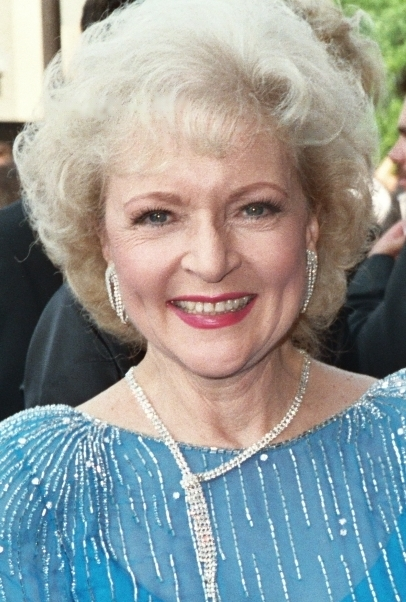
Betty White made a guest appearance as herself in "Missionary: Impossible"

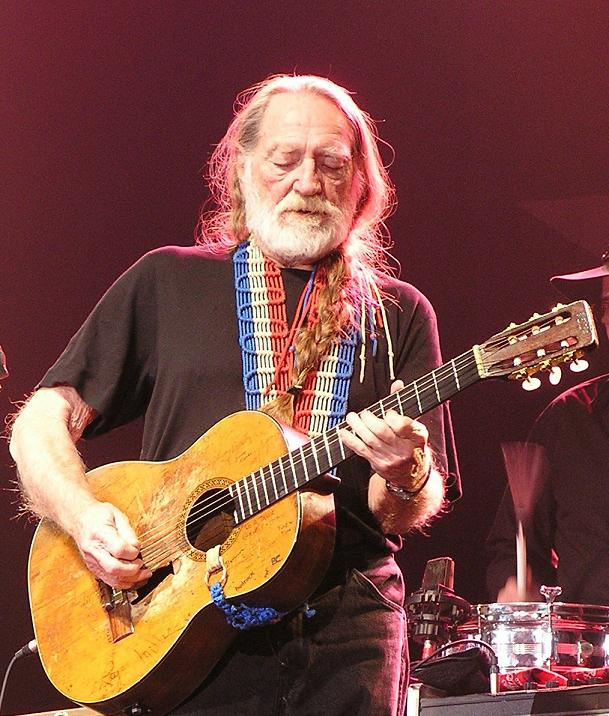
Willie Nelson guest stars as himself in "Behind the Laughter"

After the departure of Maggie Roswell, it was decided to kill-off Maude Flanders in order to open new storylines. In the episode "Alone Again, Natura-Diddily", Maude was killed off The character was voiced by Marcia Mitzman Gaven at that time.

=== Main cast ===
- Dan Castellaneta as Homer Simpson, Krusty the Clown, Mayor Quimby, Groundskeeper Willie, Grampa Simpson, Sideshow Mel, Kodos, Arnie Pye, Hans Moleman, Itchy, Benjamin, Barney Gumble, Gil Gunderson, Santa's Little Helper, Squeaky Voiced Teen, Blue-Haired Lawyer and various others
- Julie Kavner as Marge Simpson, Patty Bouvier, Selma Bouvier and various others
- Nancy Cartwright as Bart Simpson, Ralph Wiggum, Todd Flanders, Nelson Muntz, Maggie Simpson, Kearney Zzyzwicz and various others
- Yeardley Smith as Lisa Simpson
- Hank Azaria as Comic Book Guy, Professor Frink, Dr. Nick, Moe Szyslak, Chief Wiggum, Apu, Carl Carlson, Lou, Luigi Risotto, Captain McCallister, Akira Kurosawa, Snake, Cletus Spuckler, Bumblebee Man, Happy Little Elves, Disco Stu, Doug, Kirk Van Houten, Pyro, State Comptroller Atkins, Duffman and various others
- Harry Shearer as Ned Flanders, Mr. Burns, Rainier Wolfcastle, Principal Skinner, Lenny Leonard, Dr. Hibbert, Waylon Smithers, Otto Mann, Reverend Lovejoy, Kang, Maggie Simpson, Kent Brockman, Scratchy, Gary, Dewey Largo and various others

=== Recurring ===
- Marcia Mitzman Gaven as Maude Flanders and various others
- Pamela Hayden as Milhouse Van Houten, Rod Flanders, Jimbo Jones, Terri and various others
- Tress MacNeille as Agnes Skinner, Dolph Shapiro, Lindsey Naegle, Brandine Spuckler, Bernice Hibbert and various others (this was the first season to have MacNeille performing voices in every episode)
- Maggie Roswell as Maude Flanders and various others (last season to feature Roswell until season 14)
- Russi Taylor as Sherri and Terri, Martin Prince and various others
- Karl Wiedergott as additional characters

=== Guest stars ===
- Marcia Wallace as Edna Krabappel (15 episodes)
- Jan Hooks as Manjula Nahasapeemapetilon (2 episodes)
- Joe Mantegna as Fat Tony (2 episodes)
- Mel Gibson as himself ("Beyond Blunderdome")
- Jack Burns as Edward Christian ("Beyond Blunderdome")
- Mark McGwire as himself ("Brother's Little Helper")
- Ed Asner as the newspaper editor ("Guess Who's Coming to Criticize Dinner?")
- Tom Arnold as himself ("Treehouse of Horror X")
- Dick Clark as himself ("Treehouse of Horror X")
- Lucy Lawless as herself ("Treehouse of Horror X")
- Frank Welker as Werewolf Ned Flanders ("Treehouse of Horror X")
- The B-52's sing "Glove Slap" ("E-I-E-I-(Annoyed Grunt)")
- Penn & Teller as themselves ("Hello Gutter, Hello Fadder")
- Ron Howard as himself ("Hello Gutter, Hello Fadder")
- Pat O'Brien as himself ("Hello Gutter, Hello Fadder")
- Nancy O'Dell as herself ("Hello Gutter, Hello Fadder")
- Garry Marshall as Larry Kidkill ("Eight Misbehavin'")
- Butch Patrick as himself ("Eight Misbehavin'")
- John Goodman as Meathook ("Take My Wife, Sleaze")
- Henry Winkler as Ramrod ("Take My Wife, Sleaze")
- Jay North as himself ("Take My Wife, Sleaze")
- NRBQ as themselves ("Take My Wife, Sleaze")
- Tim Robbins as Jim Hope ("Grift of the Magi")
- Clarence Clemons as the Narrator ("Grift of the Magi")
- Gary Coleman as himself ("Grift of the Magi")
- Elwood Edwards as Virtual Doctor ("Little Big Mom")
- Don Cheadle as Brother Faith ("Faith Off")
- Britney Spears as herself ("The Mansion Family")
- Randy Bachman as himself ("Saddlesore Galactica")
- Trevor Denman as himself ("Saddlesore Galactica")
- C.F. Turner as himself ("Saddlesore Galactica")
- Jim Cummings as Duncan ("Saddlesore Galactica")
- Shawn Colvin as Rachel Jordan ("Alone Again, Natura-Diddily")
- Betty White as herself ("Missionary: Impossible")
- Diedrich Bader as the sheriff ("Kill the Alligator and Run")
- Robert Evans as himself ("Kill the Alligator and Run")
- Charlie Rose as himself ("Kill the Alligator and Run")
- Kid Rock as himself ("Kill the Alligator and Run")
- Joe C. as himself ("Kill the Alligator and Run")
- Frank Welker as Puma ("Last Tap Dance in Springfield")
- Parker Posey as Becky ("It's a Mad, Mad, Mad, Mad Marge")
- Marc Wilmore as Psychologist ("It's a Mad, Mad, Mad, Mad Marge")
- Willie Nelson as himself ("Behind the Laughter")
- Jim Forbes as the narrator ("Behind the Laughter")

== Release ==
=== Reception ===
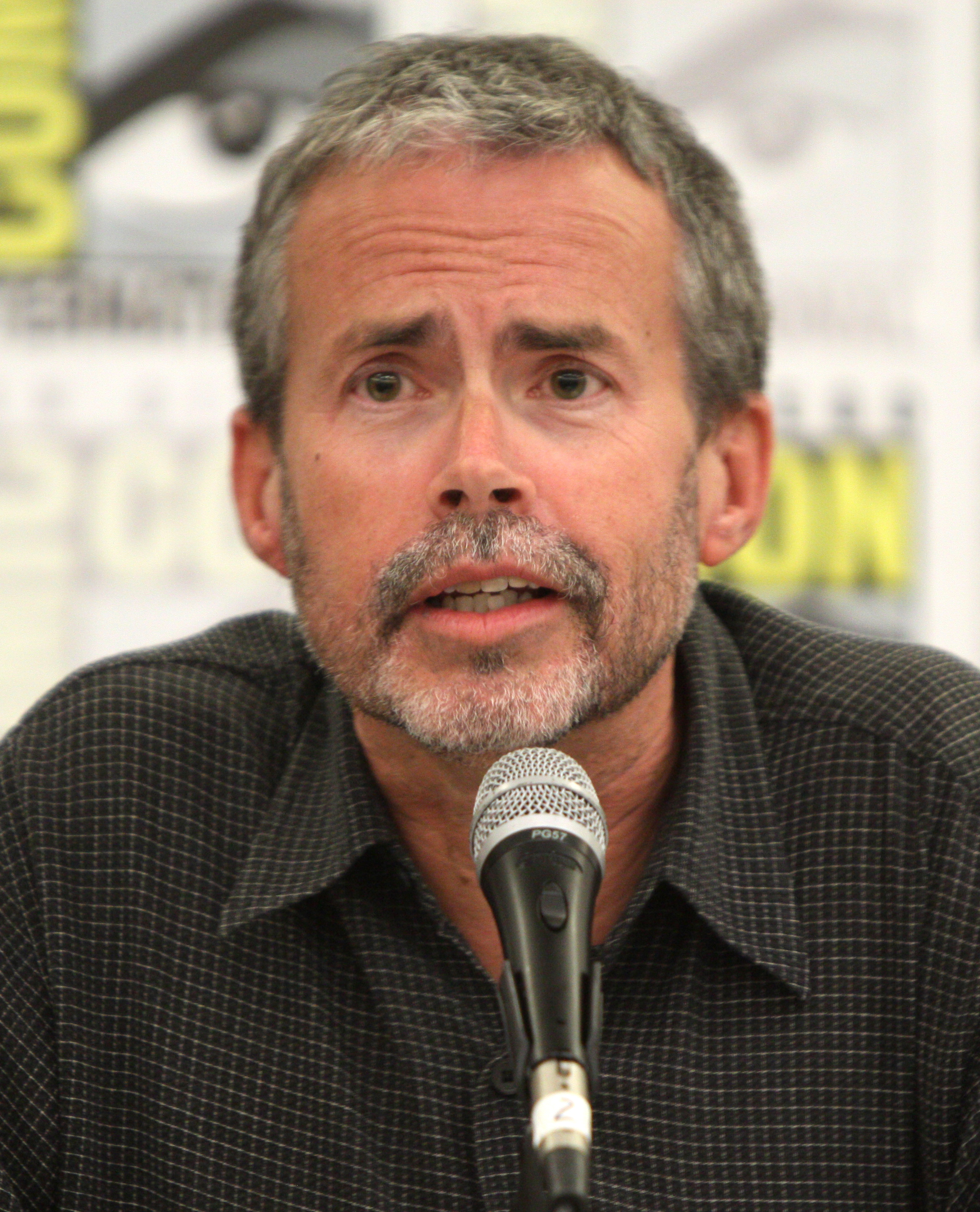
Mike Scully, showrunner of season eleven, has been the target of criticism among some fans and critics.

By 2000, with the eleventh season's airing, some long-term fans had become disillusioned with the show and pointed to its shift from character-driven plots to what they perceived as an overemphasis on zany antics and gags. An op-ed in Slate by Chris Suellentrop argued that The Simpsons changed from a realistic show about family life into a typical cartoon when Mike Scully was the showrunner: "under Scully's tenure, The Simpsons became, well, a cartoon. [...] Episodes that once would have ended with Homer and Marge bicycling into the sunset now end with Homer blowing a tranquilizer dart into Marge's neck. The show's still funny, but it hasn't been touching in years." John Ortved wrote in his book The Simpsons: An Uncensored, Unauthorized History that "Scully's episodes excel when compared to what The Simpsons airs nowadays, but he was the man at the helm when the ship turned towards the iceberg." The Simpsons under Scully has been negatively labeled as a "gag-heavy, Homer-centric incarnation" by Jon Bonné of MSNBC, and many fans have bemoaned the transformation in Homer's character during the era, from dumb yet well-meaning to "a boorish, self-aggrandizing oaf", dubbing him "Jerkass Homer".

Some eleventh-season episodes, such as "Saddlesore Galactica", and "Kill the Alligator and Run" were considered among the series' worst by some fans and critics. One of the most controversial moments in the show among fans and critics was the kill-off of Maude Flanders in "Alone Again, Natura-Diddily", which was met with strong criticism but was decided by the show's producers to open new storylines for the series.

In his review of The Simpsons: The Complete Eleventh Season, Colin Jacobson of DVD Movie Guide wrote "While I agree with fans that Season 11 of The Simpsons doesn’t fly as high as most prior years, I think it’s better than many believe." He conceded the season "comes with a few moderate clunkers and mediocrities," but said it "still manages to entertain most of the time." DVD Talk's Ian Jane said season eleven "isn't the strongest season in the series' history," but "it's still a very good one and the episodes themselves hold up surprisingly well." Nancy Basile of About.com noted the season's polarizing fan reception and gimmick episodes such as "Saddlesore Galactica" and "Alone Again, Natura-Diddily", but offered praise for other episodes like "Behind the Laughter" and "Guess Who's Coming to Criticize Dinner?". In 2003, the show's writing staff voted "Behind the Laughter" in their list of Top 15 Simpsons episode, becoming the then-most recent episode on the list.

=== Awards ===
Aside from winning several awards in 2000, The Simpsons family themselves were awarded on January 14, 2000, their own star on Hollywood's Walk of Fame at 7021 Hollywood Boulevard. The 11th season itself gathered an Emmy Award for Outstanding Animated Program, as well as an Annie Award for Outstanding Achievement in a Primetime or Late Night Animated Television Program, and a British Comedy Award for Best International Comedy TV Show. Alf Clausen also received a 2000 Annie Award for Outstanding Individual Achievement for Music in an Animated Television Production for his work on the episode "Behind the Laughter". In the same year, "Treehouse of Horror X" won the CINE Golden Eagle Award.

In 2000, music editor Bob Beecher was nominated for the Golden Reel Award for "Treehouse of Horror X". At the Prism Awards, "Days of Wine and D'oh'ses" received a commendation in the Comedy Series Episode category in 2001 for its frank depiction of alcoholism and drug rehabilitation. The show was also nominated for a Blimp Award in the Favorite Cartoon category at the 2000 Kids' Choice Awards, as well as for the Teen Choice Award in the category Choice TV Show — Comedy.

== Episodes ==
No. overall	No. in season	Title	Directed by	Written by	Original release date	Prod. code	U.S. viewers (millions)
227	1	"Beyond Blunderdome"	Steven Dean Moore	Mike Scully	September 26, 1999	AABF23	12.93 8.1 (HH) (Note: (HH) denotes that the numbers listed are the number of households the episode was viewed in.)
After destroying an "Elec-Taurus" electric car in a test run, the Simpsons are given free tickets to Mel Gibson's new film, a remake of Mr. Smith Goes to Washington. Mel Gibson, however, laments his current role without violence and wants someone to give him criticism. When Homer sees Mel talking with Marge, he gives Mel a brutal review, leading Mel to believe that Homer is the only man brave enough to give suggestions. As a result, he hires him to create a better ending. However, when the ending proves to be too controversial, Mel and Homer end up on the run from studio executives with the film.
228	2	"Brother's Little Helper"	Mark Kirkland	George Meyer	October 3, 1999	AABF22	11.45
Bart is diagnosed with Attention Deficit Disorder and prescribed a Ritalin-esque drug called Focusyn. At first, the drug makes Bart well-behaved and intellectual, but soon, Bart becomes paranoid, claiming that there are satellites owned by Major League Baseball that are spying on the town. When ordered to stop, Bart refuses, devours a few hundred, and proves his theory right by destroying the satellite with a tank. All is restored when Bart goes back to his ordinary pills.
229	3	"Guess Who's Coming to Criticize Dinner?"	Nancy Kruse	Al Jean	October 24, 1999	AABF21	10.73
Homer becomes a food critic for a Springfield newspaper and ends up annoying the restaurant owners of Springfield after he makes negative reviews just to be mean, advice he took from fellow critics. Springfield's restaurant owners then attempt to kill Homer by feeding him a poisoned éclair. When Bart learns of the plot, the family saves him but the owners assault him anyways.
230	4	"Treehouse of Horror X"	Pete Michels	Donick Cary	October 31, 1999	BABF01	13.83 8.7 (HH)
230	4	"Treehouse of Horror X"	Pete Michels	Tim Long	October 31, 1999	BABF01	13.83 8.7 (HH)
230	4	"Treehouse of Horror X"	Pete Michels	Ron Hauge	October 31, 1999	BABF01	13.83 8.7 (HH)
Intro: The Simpsons (all dressed as characters from previous Treehouse of Horror episodes, save Lisa, who is an axe murder victim) watch Kang and Kodos' lame attempt at a Halloween variety show. I Know What You Diddily-Iddily-Did – In this parody of I Know What You Did Last Summer, the Simpsons accidentally run over and kill Ned Flanders, and end up getting away with murder -- until someone (or something) haunts them with claims that he witnessed the crime. Desperately Xeeking Xena (a.k.a. "Stretch Dude and Clobber Girl in: 'Enter the Collector'") – Bart and Lisa gain super powers (Bart gains the ability to stretch while Lisa becomes super-strong) after a freak accident during a candy inspection on Halloween Night in the Springfield Elementary School gym and must save Lucy Lawless (dressed as Xena) from the Collector (Comic Book Guy). Life's a Glitch, Then You Die – After Homer forgets to make all the computers at the nuclear plant Y2K-compliant, the Y2K bug spreads to every computer and electronic device in the world, causing a technological apocalypse.
231	5	"E-I-E-I-(Annoyed Grunt)"	Bob Anderson	Ian Maxtone-Graham	November 7, 1999	AABF19	14.35
Inspired by a cheesy "Zorro" movie, Homer begins slapping people with a glove and challenging them to duels (with the victims giving Homer whatever he wants instead of accepting the challenge), but when a real Southern gentleman accepts Homer's request for a duel, the Simpsons run off to the old farm Homer lived in with his parents (as seen in the season six episode "Grampa vs. Sexual Inadequacy") and breed a dangerously addictive but successful tobacco/tomato hybrid called "tomacco". Just when they are about to gain a hundred million dollars from the hybrid, dangerously addicted animals ruin their plan. Homer proceeds to duel, only to get shot in the arm.
232	6	"Hello Gutter, Hello Fadder"	Mike B. Anderson	Al Jean	November 14, 1999	BABF02	14.68
Homer becomes a local celebrity after bowling a 300 game, but his fame quickly fades as "yesterday's news". After a botched suicide attempt foiled by Otto, Homer decides to spend time with Maggie after seeing Ron Howard spend time with his children. When Homer tries to teach Maggie swimming, he fails due to her mistrust of him, and has to pulled out the beach by Maggie. Eventually, Homer brings Maggie to a bowling game, where she bowls a perfect game.
233	7	"Eight Misbehavin'"	Steven Dean Moore	Matt Selman	November 21, 1999	BABF03	15.89
After Manjula gives birth to octuplets that were the result of fertility drugs, she and Apu unintentionally allow a zookeeper to exploit their babies in exchange for help after corporate sponsors abandon them for a mom that has given birth to nontuplets in Shelbyville. After a failed rescue attempt by Homer and Apu, the zoo keeper agrees to return the babies only if Butch Patrick and Homer ride a tricycle dressed as Eddie Munster on stage while attacked by cobras.
234	8	"Take My Wife, Sleaze"	Neil Affleck	John Swartzwelder	November 28, 1999	BABF05	15.28
Homer wins a Harley-Davidson motorcycle at a fifties dancing contest and starts his own biker gang, naming it "Hell's Satans". However, this attracts the real biker gang called "Hell's Satans" to crash at their house. However, after a while, they begin to appreciate Marge, who takes care of them, and kidnaps her. Homer tracks them down and scuffles with Meathook, the leader. At Marge's suggestion, the gang settles down and lives normal lives.
235	9	"Grift of the Magi"	Matthew Nastuk	Tom Martin	December 19, 1999	BABF07	12.48 7.76 (HH)
Principal Skinner hires Fat Tony's construction company to build wheelchair ramps for the school. These ramps promptly break down, forcing Skinner to close down Springfield Elementary. However, a toy company led by Jim Hope takes over the school; in school, the children are only taught to provide marketing schemes and suggestions. Soon, a new toy called Funzo that mysteriously resembles the children's ideas is invented. After a brief showdown Gary Coleman and the Funzo, things return to normal as Burns decides to fund the school after a visit from the three Christmas spirits.
236	10	"Little Big Mom"	Mark Kirkland	Carolyn Omine	January 9, 2000	BABF04	17.88
While the Simpson family goes skiing, Marge remains at the ski lodge due to her fear of the sport, only to have her leg broken by a falling clock. As a result, while hospitalized, Marge leaves Lisa to deal with the slovenly Bart and Homer, who do nothing but take their toll on their house. In a desperate attempt to motivate them, she pulls a prank suggested by the ghost of Lucille Ball on Bart and Homer by making it look like they have leprosy. At Ned Flanders' suggestion, Bart and Homer end up in Hawaii; with them gone, Lisa finishes cleaning the house as Marge arrives home, her cast off. The pair then go to retrieve Homer and Bart, who are enjoying themselves despite the shock therapy.
237	11	"Faith Off"	Nancy Kruse	Frank Mula	January 16, 2000	BABF06	19.16
Bart believes he has the power to heal others through faith after removing a bucket glued to Homer's head. However, when Bart knocks Milhouse's glasses off in order to cure his myopia, Milhouse is nearly run over by a truck that he thinks is a dog as he cannot see without his glasses. Consequently, Bart, feeling guilty, ends his career as a faith healer. Meanwhile, Homer creates a homecoming game float for Springfield University. However, he soon forgets about it, and accidentally injures the star player, Anton Lubchenko. After getting in trouble with Fat Tony, Homer is saved when Lubchenko sacrifices his leg to win the game; the leg is surgically reattached by Dr. Hibbert, who is relieved at the end of Bart's healing career.
238	12	"The Mansion Family"	Mike Frank Polcino	John Swartzwelder	January 23, 2000	BABF08	18.37 11.3 (HH)
Mr. Burns goes to the Mayo Clinic for a checkup after being declared the oldest man in Springfield, leaving the Simpsons to house-sit for him and Homer to take advantage of living as a rich man. However, when Homer wants to throw a party, he goes to Moe's, where he must buy the alcohol in international waters as it is Sunday before 2 PM. There, they are captured by Chinese pirates. Later, Burns discovers that as a result of having every disease in existence, he is perfectly healthy, as all the germs simply cancel each other out. Consequently, he returns and kicks out the Simpsons, who have not even enjoyed being rich, causing Homer to be extremely bitter and resentful.
239	13	"Saddlesore Galactica"	Lance Kramer	Tim Long	February 6, 2000	BABF09	16.48 9.6 (HH)
The Simpsons rescue a diving horse named Duncan from abuse and keep him as a pet (despite Comic Book Guy's protest that the Simpsons have done this before), but when the cost of upkeeping the horse rises, Homer and Bart train Duncan to be a racing horse. Meanwhile, Lisa is upset over her school losing the band competition to Ogdenville unfairly at the state fair and writes a letter to Bill Clinton in protest.
240	14	"Alone Again, Natura-Diddily"	Jim Reardon	Ian Maxtone-Graham	February 13, 2000	BABF10	18.37 10.8 (HH)
The Simpsons and Flanders are watching a stock car race when a T-shirt from a cannon hits Maude Flanders, and she is killed in a freak accident. devastating Ned. Homer, feeling guilty in his role in her death, helps Ned find a new woman for his grieving neighbor. However, Ned begins losing his faith in God but feels guilty. At church, he hears a song from a Christian rock band that renews his faith, and he bonds with the lead singer.
241	15	"Missionary: Impossible"	Steven Dean Moore	Ron Hauge	February 20, 2000	BABF11	16.39
Homer gets in trouble with PBS after confessing he does not have $10,000 to give them for their pledge drive. After seeking refuge, Reverend Lovejoy sends him to be a missionary on a South Pacific island. He bonds with a girl he calls Lisa Jr. and teaches the natives vices such as gambling and alcohol instead of religion. However, an earthquake on the island causes lava to rise. As Homer falls to his death, Fox asks for donations to keep the network operating.
242	16	"Pygmoelian"	Mark Kirkland	Larry Doyle	February 27, 2000	BABF12	16.51
After getting his face censored out on the Duff Calendar for not being photogenic, Moe gets plastic surgery and becomes the star of a popular soap opera. However, when he reads his character is to be killed, he reveals all the storylines on air but learns it was supposed to be a dream sequence. He is fired, and a set piece crushes his face back to its old form. Meanwhile, Bart and Lisa go after Maggie's pink elephant balloon after it floats away.
243	17	"Bart to the Future"	Michael Marcantel	Dan Greaney	March 19, 2000	BABF13	14.71 8.77 (HH)
After their vacation in the woods is cut short due to a mosquito infestation, The Simpsons stop by at an Indian casino, where Bart tries to sneak in and ends up in the office of an Indian mystic who shows Bart's future in the year 2030 as a washed-up rock star living with Ralph Wiggum while Lisa is the President of the United States trying to get the country out of financial trouble.
244	18	"Days of Wine and D'oh'ses"	Neil Affleck	Dan Castellaneta & Deb Lacusta	April 9, 2000	BABF14	13.72
Barney realizes how much of a pathetic drunk he is after watching his birthday party video and decides to give up alcohol forever. He learns to fly a helicopter but argues with Homer because they no longer have fun adventures together while drunk. Meanwhile, Bart and Lisa work together to take a memorable photo for a new phone book cover contest. In the forest, they accidentally start a fire and are trapped. Barney and Homer make amends while rescuing them with the helicopter.
245	19	"Kill the Alligator and Run"	Jen Kamerman	John Swartzwelder	April 30, 2000	BABF16	12.87 7.46 (HH)
Homer has a nervous breakdown when it is revealed on a quiz that he only has three years left to live. To calm him down, the family goes to Florida for vacation--and end up in the middle of a raucous spring break, where Homer joins in on the party and ends up getting himself and his family in trouble for killing the county's beloved mascot: an alligator named Captain Jack.
246	20	"Last Tap Dance in Springfield"	Nancy Kruse	Julie Thacker	May 7, 2000	BABF15	12.13
Inspired by a movie about a girl who enters a tango contest and wins, Lisa decides to sign up for dance lessons -- and ends up taking tap lessons from a former child star. However, she is the worst dancer of her class and is not allowed to perform. Professor Frink helps by giving her a set of automatic tap-dancing shoes, but when they malfunction, Homer saves her by tripping her. Meanwhile, Bart and Milhouse hide out at the mall to escape going to summer camp. When they create a mess, the mall manager concludes it is the work of a giant rat. A puma is released to catch it, but the boys uses a ball of yarn to distract it and escape.
247	21	"It's a Mad, Mad, Mad, Mad Marge"	Steven Dean Moore	Larry Doyle	May 14, 2000	BABF18	12.22
Otto dumps his fiancee, Becky, at the altar, leaving her to become the Simpsons' latest houseguest, prompting Marge to go insane when Patty and Selma scare Marge with thoughts of Becky replacing Marge as a wife and mother. Meanwhile, Springfield Elementary gives Bart's fourth grade class videocameras (after slashing geography out of the budget) and Bart sets out to create a movie.
248	22	"Behind the Laughter"	Mark Kirkland	Tim Long, George Meyer, Mike Scully & Matt Selman	May 21, 2000	BABF19	13.84
In a parody of VH1's Behind the Music, viewers take an inside look at The Simpsons and the family's rise to fame. As it grows, Homer becomes addicted to prescription drugs, Marge wastes their money, and Bart is sent to rehab. The family's issues cause them to split apart. The series is put on hiatus, and each family member peruses solo projects. When they are tricked into appearing together at a fake awards show, they reconcile and resume the series.

== DVD release ==
The Simpsons season 11 DVD digipak, special Krusty head edition

The DVD boxset for Season 11 was released by 20th Century Fox Home Entertainment in the United States and Canada on October 7, 2008, eight years after it had completed broadcast on television, in the UK on October 6, 2008, and in Australia on November 5, 2008. The special features include deleted scenes, storyboards/animatics, and commentaries.

The set was released in two different packagings: a standard rectangular cardboard box featuring Krusty the Clown on the cover, and a "limited edition" plastic packaging molded to look like Krusty's head. This is first time that a character-themed packaging doesn't feature a main character from The Simpsons family. Unlike the previous seasons, the Collector's Edition packaging is a removable molded face attached to a cardboard sleeve, as opposed to a fully plastic clamshell. Both versions have changed from a digipak style of disc tray in previous seasons, to an accordion-style series of cardboard sleeves into which the discs slide. Following the release of the set, there were a number of complaints regarding the style of packaging as the cardboard packaging may scratch the discs; David Lambert of TVShowsOnDVD.com described the set as "functionally defective."

The Complete Eleventh Season
Set details			Special features
22 episodes; 4-disc set; 1.33:1 aspect ratio; AUDIO; English 5.1 Dolby Digital; Spanish 2.0 Dolby Surround; French 2.0 Dolby Surround; SUBTITLES; English SDH; Spanish			Optional commentaries for all 22 episodes; Introduction from Matt Groening; Deleted Scenes; Beyond Blunderdome; Brother's Little Helper; Guess Who's Coming to Criticize Dinner?; Treehouse of Horror X; Hello Gutter, Hello Fadder; Eight Misbehavin'; Take My Wife, Sleaze; Grift of the Magi; Little Big Mom; Faith Off; The Mansion Family; Saddlesore Galactica; Alone Again, Natura-Diddily; Missionary: Impossible; Pygmoelian; Bart to the Future; Days of Wine and D'oh'ses; Kill the Alligator and Run; Last Tap Dance in Springfield; It's a Mad, Mad, Mad, Mad Marge; Special Language Feature; Beyond Blunderdome; Portuguese 2.0 Dolby Surround; Czech 2.0 Dolby Surround; German 2.0 Dolby Surround; Italian 2.0 Dolby Surround; Featurette: "The Many Faces of Krusty"; Featurette: "A Star on Hollywood Boulevard"; Extra: "And Then There Were Menus"; Sketch gallery; Animation Showcases; Beyond Blunderdome; The Mansion Family; Easter Egg: Preview of The Simpsons Ride
Release dates
Region 1	Region 2	Region 4	
October 7, 2008	October 6, 2008	November 6, 2008	
