= Kill the Alligator and Run =

- The Simpsons episode
- Episode no.: Season 11; Episode 19
- Directed by: Jen Kamerman
- Written by: John Swartzwelder
- Production code: BABF16
- Original air date: April 30, 2000

Guest appearances
- Diedrich Bader as the sheriff; Robert Evans, Charlie Rose, Kid Rock, and Joe C. as themselves

Episode features
- Chalkboard gag: "I am not here on a fartball scholarship"
- Couch gag: The Simpsons are barefoot and briskly walking across a bed of hot coals in order to reach the couch. When they sit down, the soles of their feet are black and smoldering.
- Commentary: Mike Scully; George Meyer; Ian Maxtone-Graham; Matt Selman; Julie Thacker; Dan Castellaneta; Diedrich Bader; Steven Dean Moore

Episode chronology
← Previous "Days of Wine and D'oh'ses"	Next → "Last Tap Dance in Springfield"
- The Simpsons season 11

"Kill the Alligator and Run" is the nineteenth episode of the eleventh season of the American animated television series The Simpsons. It originally aired on Fox in the United States on April 30, 2000. In the episode, Homer has a nervous breakdown after taking a quiz that suggests he only has three years left to live. To calm himself down, he and the rest of the Simpson family go to Florida for vacation. There, they end up in the middle of a raucous spring break. Homer joins in on the party and ends up getting himself and his family in trouble for killing the state's beloved mascot, an alligator named Captain Jack. The Simpsons run from the law and take jobs at a small restaurant while hiding from the police.

"Kill the Alligator and Run" was written by John Swartzwelder and directed by Jen Kamerman. Diedrich Bader guest starred in the episode as a sheriff that tries to arrest the Simpson family, while Robert Evans and Charlie Rose guest starred in a scene in which Homer watches the two in an interview on television. Kid Rock and Joe C. also made guest appearances as themselves in the episode, performing at a concert in Florida that Homer attends.

The reception of "Kill the Alligator and Run" by critics was mixed. Fan reception was more negative; former showrunner Mike Scully later noted that the episode is considered by many fans to be one of the worst Simpsons episodes due to its outlandish and erratic plotline. Around 7.46 million American homes tuned in to watch the episode during its original airing. In 2008, it was released on DVD along with the rest of the episodes of the eleventh season.

== Plot ==
Homer receives a magazine full of personality tests, from which he takes one which concludes he has only three years left to live. Terrified of his supposedly impending death, he develops insomnia and has a mental breakdown, which is fully exhibited during an inspection of the Nuclear Power Plant. On advice of the power plant's psychiatrist, the family head for a restful vacation in Florida. Upon arriving, they are greeted by wild college students in the middle of a raucous spring break. Wanting Homer to get the rest and recuperation he needs, Marge tries to confine him to his hotel room, but he escapes to party and attends a concert featuring Joe C. and Kid Rock.

The debauchery makes Homer feel better, but he is disappointed when spring break ends and students attending the concert return to their studies. Still wanting to party though, Homer rents an airboat and makes his family join him on a joyride through the local swamp. There he accidentally runs over the town's most famous resident and reptile, an alligator named Captain Jack. The local sheriff subsequently arrests the entire family. The family attempts to flee in their car but the sheriff gives chase until the family are pushed down the rails by an oncoming Amtrak train.

Lost in the wilderness and on the run, the family come across a diner, where they are given employment. They are eventually tracked down by the sheriff, who kidnaps them while they are asleep. For their crimes (and Homer's attempt at defending himself in court, calling the jury "drunken hicks"), the family is put into forced labor. While assigned to work at a party held by a judge in front of the capitol, it is revealed that Captain Jack was never dead, but simply knocked out. The family are released, but are banned from the state of Florida - leaving them only able to travel to Arizona or North Dakota (the former of which Homer rejects because he dislikes its odor).

== Production ==
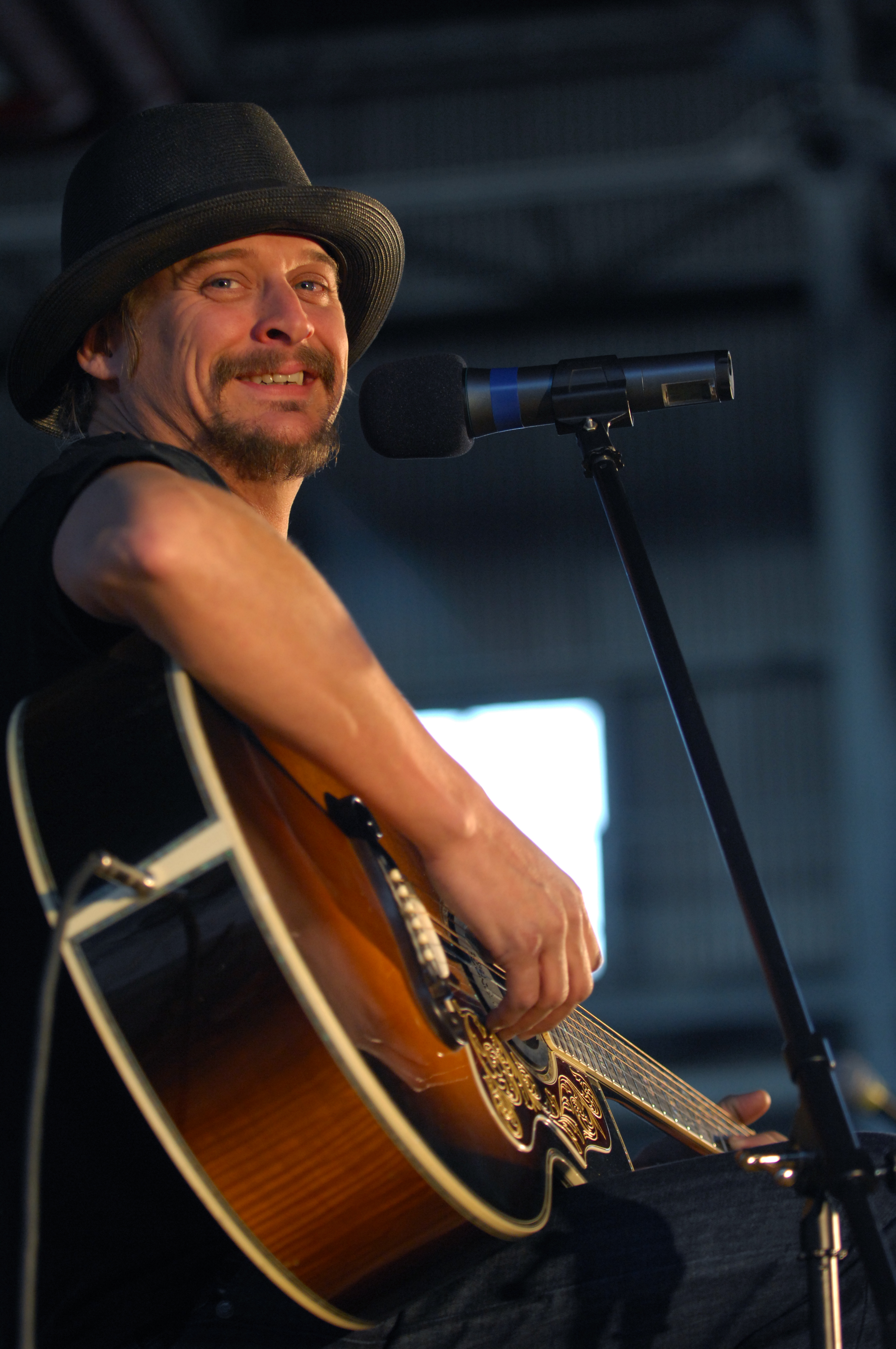
Rapper Kid Rock appeared in the episode as himself.

"Kill the Alligator and Run" was written by John Swartzwelder and directed by Jen Kamerman as part of the eleventh season of The Simpsons (1999–2000). When the animation department finished its work on the episode, it had ended up being about four minutes too long and the staff of the show was forced to make some difficult cuts. One scene that was cut saw Captain Jack lying in state at the capitol in Florida, with Kid Rock being one of the people present to pay their respects to the alligator. The Simpsons showrunner Mike Scully has expressed regret for cutting this scene because it "hurts the logic" later in the episode when Captain Jack crawls out of the capitol and reveals himself to everyone, thus creating a plot hole due to a lack of any explanation as to how he got there.

Actor Diedrich Bader guest starred in the episode as the sheriff. The Simpsons producer Ian Maxtone-Graham directed Bader during his recording session, telling the guest star to do a Southern accent. The episode also features guest appearances from talk show host Charlie Rose and film producer Robert Evans as themselves. Evans and Rose appear in a scene at the beginning of the episode, when Homer stays up late and watches Rose interview Evans on the television, hallucinating them threatening to kill him. Their conversation mentions Evans's films Love Story and The Two Jakes, as well as Vincent Canby.

Rappers Kid Rock and Joe C. also guest star in the episode as themselves, performing at the annual spring break concert that Homer sneaks out to attend. Kid Rock's song "Bawitdaba" features as part of his appearance. Scully said in an interview with the Detroit Free Press that the staff of the show chose Kid Rock and Joe C. for the episode because the two "have a lot of stage presence" and visually are "a funny combination," and because the staff thought "they would be funny playing off Homer." According to Scully, the two musicians "had a great sense of humor [...] about themselves," with Kid Rock asking if "he could add a couple of his own lines. He wanted to introduce himself as 'the pimp of the nation.' We kept that in the show. It's quite a title." Kid Rock recorded some of his dialog over the phone, but also paid a 45-minute visit to the Simpsons studio in Los Angeles to record lines. Scully thought it looked like the singer enjoyed the experience and was surprised to see that he arrived on time. "My first reaction to that was, 'What kind of rock star is this?'," Scully jokingly told the Detroit Free Press. All of Joe C.'s lines were recorded over the phone.

== Release and reception ==
The episode originally aired on the Fox network in the United States on April 30, 2000. It was viewed in approximately 7.46 million households that night. With a Nielsen rating of 7.4, the episode finished 46th in the ratings for the week of April 24–30, 2000. It was the third highest-rated broadcast on Fox that week, following an episode of Malcolm in the Middle (which received an 8.2 rating) and an episode of The X-Files (which received a 7.7 rating). On October 7, 2008, "Kill the Alligator and Run" was released on DVD as part of the box set The Simpsons – The Complete Eleventh Season. Staff members Mike Scully, Ian Maxtone-Graham, George Meyer, Matt Selman, Julie Thacker, and Steven Dean Moore, as well as cast member Dan Castellaneta and guest star Diedrich Bader, participated in the DVD audio commentary for the episode. Deleted scenes from the episode were also included in the box set.

According to Scully, "Kill the Alligator and Run" is often cited by fans of The Simpsons as one of the worst episodes ever because of its structure and outlandish nature. Scully has said that the episode is "kind of three stories in one." Meyer, a writer and producer on the show, said in the DVD audio commentary that the fans thought it was "kind of a frenetic and crazy, chaotic episode," adding: "I can't disagree. But we had a lot of fun writing it, and we stand by it." While reviewing the eleventh season of The Simpsons, DVD Movie Guide's Colin Jacobson commented on the episode, writing: "Wow – this may be the most jumbled Simpsons to date! The episode seems to suffer from ADD as it can’t focus on any topic for very long. It flits from one gag to another with abandon and rarely makes much sense – or produces many laughs. Yeah, it has a few amusing moments, but it’s too scattershot to succeed." Annie Alleman of The Herald News, on the other hand, named "Kill the Alligator and Run" her eighth favorite Simpsons episode. Nancy Basile of About.com thought the best scene of the episode is the one where the Simpsons have become hillbillies and are sitting on their porch, and Bart says "I'm getting used to this country life. Teacher says I'm whittling at a tenth-grade level." Corey Deiterman of the Houston Press listed Kid Rock at number one in his list of the top five worst musical guests in Simpsons history.
