= The Mansion Family =

- The Simpsons episode
- Episode no.: Season 11; Episode 12
- Directed by: Mike Frank Polcino
- Written by: John Swartzwelder
- Production code: BABF08
- Original air date: January 23, 2000

Guest appearance
- Britney Spears as herself

Episode features
- Chalkboard gag: "Class clown is not a paid position"
- Couch gag: Marge and Homer are children while Bart and Lisa are adults (and Maggie is a baby doll in Homer’s arms). Homer reaches for the remote control, but Lisa slaps it away from him.
- Commentary: Mike Scully; George Meyer; Ron Hauge; Matt Selman; Tim Long; Mike Frank Polcino; Donick Cary; Pete Michels

Episode chronology
← Previous "Faith Off"	Next → "Saddlesore Galactica"
- The Simpsons season 11

"The Mansion Family" is the twelfth episode of the eleventh season of the American animated television series The Simpsons. It originally aired on the Fox network in the United States on January 23, 2000, and was watched in around 11.3 million homes during the broadcast. In the episode, Mr. Burns goes to the Mayo Clinic for a check-up after being declared the oldest man in Springfield at an awards ceremony. He leaves the Simpson family to house-sit his mansion for him. When Homer throws a party on Burns' private yacht in international waters, the party goers are captured by Chinese pirates.

American pop singer Britney Spears guest starred in "The Mansion Family" as herself. She appears as the host of the awards ceremony. The episode, which was written by John Swartzwelder and directed by Mike Frank Polcino, features several cultural references. Many parts of the story were inspired by real-life events experienced by some of the staff members of the series.

Since airing, the episode has received generally mixed reviews from critics. It was released on the DVD collection The Simpsons Gone Wild in 2004, and The Simpsons – The Complete Eleventh Season in 2008.

== Plot ==
Kent Brockman and Britney Spears host the annual Springfield Pride Awards, given to prominent Springfield citizens for their achievements. The award for the oldest man in town goes to 108-year-old Cornelius Chapman, but Spears' congratulatory kiss on the cheek causes him to die of a heart attack. The award therefore goes to the oldest Springfieldian now present, Mr. Burns. Suddenly, Burns realizes he is not young anymore, so he and his assistant Smithers go to the Mayo Clinic for a check-up. Burns engages the Simpson family to house sit his private mansion.

After enjoying life as a billionaire for a few days, Homer decides to throw a party before Burns returns. He heads to Moe's Tavern to buy beer and invite his friends to the party. However, Moe informs Homer that he can not sell him alcohol before 2:00 pm as it is Sunday. When Homer is told the only way he could buy alcohol would be to sail 12 miles out to international waters where there are no laws, he and his friends (including his son Bart) set sail in Burns' private yacht to throw the party there. Once out in international waters, Bart spots a Coast Guard ship on the other side of the boundary line but the Coast Guard sailor on board says he can't stop them because it's out of his jurisdiction saying that he just wants to party and begins playing The Doobie Brothers song "China Grove".

Back at the Mayo Clinic, Burns discovers that he not only has all previously discovered diseases, but numerous new diseases the doctors have just discovered in him. However, the sheer number of diseases prevents any one disease from actually doing harm to him. This leads Burns to conclude that he is indestructible, even though the doctors protest that even a slight breeze could disrupt the balance in his body.

Meanwhile, the party continues and the partygoers force Burns' monkeys into a knife fight. The yacht is eventually boarded by Chinese pirates who take the ship hostage. The pirates rob everyone on board and tie them up in a big net which they then toss overboard. Luckily, however, the net floats, stopping Homer, Bart and most of the partygoers above the water from drowning. After Marge and Lisa have scrubbed all the rooms clean, the family return the mansion to Burns.

Back home, the family is glad to live a normal life again, with the exception of Homer, who regrets that he does not live the lifestyle of rich people. As the closing credits roll, Homer wails about how rich nearly all the people are and threatens to report them to the Internal Revenue Service, before Gracie Films logo lady says "Shh!", making him say "Don't shush me, you rich bastard!".

== Production ==
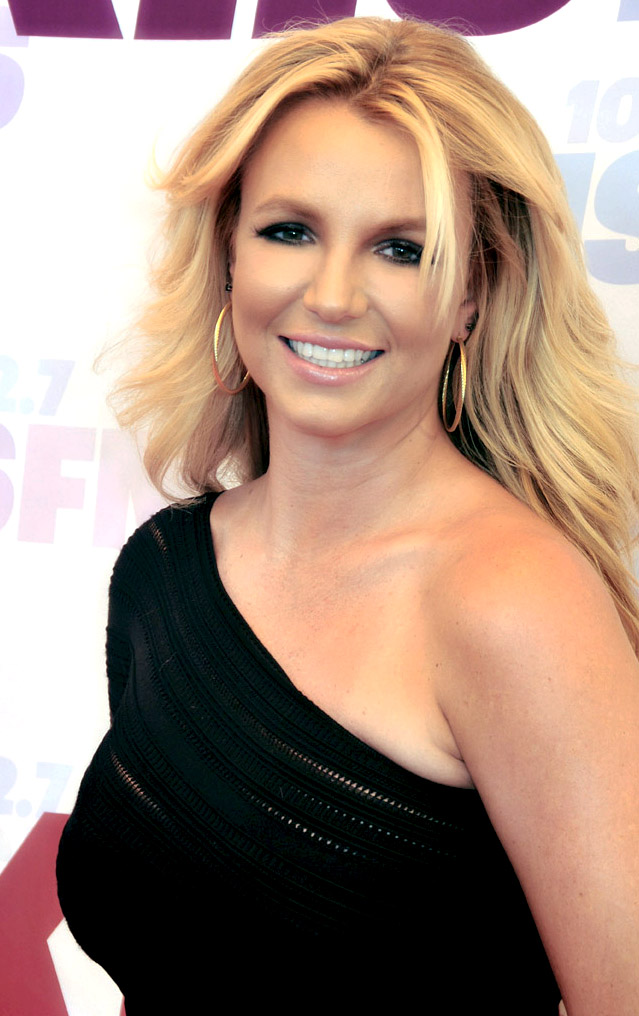
Singer Britney Spears appears in the episode.

"The Mansion Family" was written by John Swartzwelder and directed by Mike Frank Polcino as part of the eleventh season of The Simpsons (1999–2000). It was the first of many episodes of the series that Polcino directed. Executive producer Mike Scully was the one who received the idea for the first part of the story. He explained on a DVD audio commentary for the episode that his grandmother was the oldest citizen of his hometown West Springfield, Massachusetts, and "they had a ceremony where she was awarded a cane that had a golden head on it. And the weird thing of the ceremony is her name wasn't on the cane, and the mayor of the town stood up and he says: 'And now, of course as soon as Hazel passes away, her name will be engraved on the cane.' So she would never live to see it happen. But nonetheless, she was given the cane."

The subplot of "The Mansion Family", where Mr. Burns gets a medical examination, was inspired by Swartzwelder's own visit to a Mayo Clinic. George Meyer, an executive producer on the series, has said that "John, I don't think he is a guy who goes to the doctor very often. And every 20 or 30 years, he decides he needs to get a tune up. So he went to the Mayo Clinic, had they give him an entire battery of tests. And as John [jokingly] tells it, they said that his constant smoking had done no harm to him whatsoever. Might even be benefiting him." While writing the parts of the episode that involve international waters, the writers did research and found that the actual laws of international waters are more complex and ambiguous compared to what they had already written in the story, but they decided to ignore that.

American pop singer Britney Spears guest starred in the episode as herself. According to Scully, she was seventeen to eighteen years old when she recorded her lines, and "She was a lot of fun to work with. She was a fan of the show, and she was willing to do all the lines. It was all the people around her that were crazy, the management and all that. We originally had her introduce herself [in the episode] as 'I'm teenage songbird Britney Spears.' And she recorded a few takes and they were fine. And suddenly, all these guys come rushing in [saying] 'She can't say songbird.' [We asked] what's wrong with songbird? And they were somehow convinced that it was some sort of slam or an insult." The staff members were therefore forced to change her opening line to "I'm teen sensation Britney Spears."

Many scenes in "The Mansion Family" were inspired by popular culture. For example, there is a painting hanging on one of the walls in Burns' mansion that depicts Burns playing poker with dogs, referencing the oil paintings series Dogs Playing Poker. Another painting, showing a nude Burns, is a callback to a previous episode of the series, "Brush with Greatness" (1991), in which Marge produced the painting for Burns. Featured in the episode is also a joke that makes fun of the Grammy Awards. During the awards ceremony, Homer complains, "Why won't anyone give me an award?" When Lisa points out that "You won a Grammy," Homer says "I mean an award that's worth winning." At this point the screen freezes and a message scrolls across the bottom of the screen reading "LEGAL DISCLAIMER: Mr. Simpson's opinions do not reflect those of the producers, who don't consider the Grammy an award at all."

== Release ==
The episode originally aired on the Fox network in the United States on January 23, 2000. It was viewed in approximately 11.3 million households that night. With a Nielsen rating of 11.2, the episode tied Becker (CBS) for the 14th place (compared the season average of 37) in the ratings for the week of January 17–23, 2000. The episode was the third highest-rated broadcast on Fox that week, following a NFC Championship post-game show and Malcolm in the Middle.

=== Home media ===
On September 14, 2004, the episode was released in the United States on a DVD collection titled The Simpsons Gone Wild, along with "Homer's Night Out" (season 1), "Sunday, Cruddy Sunday" (season 10) and "Homer the Moe" (season 13). On October 7, 2008, "The Mansion Family" was released on DVD again as part of the box set The Simpsons – The Complete Eleventh Season. Crew members Mike Scully, George Meyer, Ron Hauge, Matt Selman, Tim Long, Mike Frank Polcino, Donick Cary and Pete Michels participated in the audio commentary. Deleted scenes were also included on the box set.

=== Critical reception ===
"The Mansion Family" has received generally mixed reception from critics.

Susan Dunne of The Hartford Courant described it as "debauched but hilarious."

While reviewing the eleventh season of The Simpsons, DVD Movie Guide's Colin Jacobson commented on "The Mansion Family", writing that "Although The Simpsons started out as moderately reality based, pretty much any grounding was gone by [the point this episode aired]. That doesn't mean the show fails to depict funny bits, especially during the dark humor of Burns’ hospital visit. Nonetheless, [the episode] occasionally goes too far to the side of silliness; those gags are hit or miss."

In a review of the episodes featured on the Gone Wild DVD, PopMatters critic Stephen Haag wrote that "none of these episodes will end up in the Simpsons Hall of Fame", and that "The Mansion Family" is "hardly a classic episode, but Lord knows there are plenty worse from season 11." He further commented that "if anything, this episode should be included in the 'batshit-crazy endings' DVD," referring to the ending scenes with the Chinese pirates.

David Packard of DVD Verdict was more positive in his review of Gone Wild, writing that "The Mansion Family" is "another all-around hilarious episode, with a nice swipe at the Grammy Awards, the Simpsons family running amok in the mansion and enjoying all it has to offer, and Burns' various tests at the Mayo Clinic (my favorite gag is when Burns is slid into an MRI machine, only to hear the thing grind to a halt with an error message reading 'Clear body jam in Area 1.')"
