= It's a Mad, Mad, Mad, Mad Marge =

- The Simpsons episode
- Episode no.: Season 11; Episode 21
- Directed by: Steven Dean Moore
- Written by: Larry Doyle
- Production code: BABF18
- Original air date: May 14, 2000

Guest appearances
- Parker Posey as Becky; Marcia Wallace as Edna Krabappel; Marc Wilmore as Psychologist

Episode features
- Chalkboard gag: "I cannot hire a substitute student"
- Couch gag: The Simpsons are blank paint-by-numbers figures; Korean animators come in and color the family, but do not detail Homer and Marge's eyes.
- Commentary: Mike Scully; George Meyer; Ian Maxtone-Graham; Matt Selman; Larry Doyle; Steven Dean Moore

Episode chronology
← Previous "Last Tap Dance in Springfield"	Next → "Behind the Laughter"
- The Simpsons season 11

"It's a Mad, Mad, Mad, Mad Marge" is the twenty-first and penultimate episode of the eleventh season of the American animated television series The Simpsons. It first aired in the United States on the Fox network on May 14, 2000. After a failed marriage attempt with Otto, Becky (played by guest actress Parker Posey) stays with the Simpson family. However, Marge begins to get paranoid at her family's newfound love of Becky, and begins to think that she is seducing Homer.

The episode was directed by Steven Dean Moore and written by Larry Doyle. Doyle was assigned to write the episode based on actress Drew Barrymore's desire to appear in a Simpsons episode; Barrymore instead appeared in a later episode and the guest role of this episode was given to Posey.

== Plot ==
While all of Bart's class is given a camera with which to create video projects, Otto proposes to his girlfriend, Becky, who accepts. As the Simpsons still have everything from Apu's wedding, the ceremony will take place at their house. On the day, Becky admits to Marge the biggest difference between her and Otto is that she hates heavy metal music. When Becky objects to Otto having a Poison tribute band (called Cyanide) play "Nothin' but a Good Time" at the ceremony, Marge suggests to Becky that she give Otto a choice; he can either have her as his wife or heavy metal. Otto chooses heavy metal, and breaks up with Becky.

On Bart's suggestion, Becky stays with the Simpson family. Marge consoles her, but when Becky begins to help out around the house and is praised for her contribution, Marge begins to worry that her family likes Becky more than her. She becomes increasingly paranoid that Becky is trying to kill her once she finds the brakes on her car were cut. Becky and the rest of the family meet without Marge at an ice cream parlor, where Becky tells everyone that she has found a new apartment and is moving out. Homer then passes out face first in a large Noah's Ark-themed bowl of ice cream, prompting Becky to give him mouth-to-mouth, which Marge sees and thinks she is kissing him. She attacks Becky but is arrested and sent to a sanity hearing, where due to her past affection for Ringo Starr and her belief in God, the certifying board decide to commit her.

Marge escapes custody, resulting in a media frenzy derides her as crazy. She goes to the library to find out more about Becky, but after finding nothing bad about her and a newspaper tablet of how she ruined Becky's wedding, Marge realizes she has let her paranoia get the better of her and that she has been unfair to Becky. Finally, she returns home, only to find Becky appearing to torture the family and seemingly about to sacrifice Homer with a knife. Marge intervenes, but the scene is revealed to be a sequence Bart is filming for his school project. Homer admits that he accidentally drained the brake fluid from Marge's car while changing its oil. Marge apologizes to Becky, who admits that she did intend to kill Marge and steal her family, but decided not to after she could not get a shovel. Marge is suddenly tranquilized by the mental hospital staff, but the drugs do not take effect as she has too much work to do. She alludes to Homer she has housework for him to do, so Homer tranquilizes Marge himself, sending her straight to sleep.

== Production ==
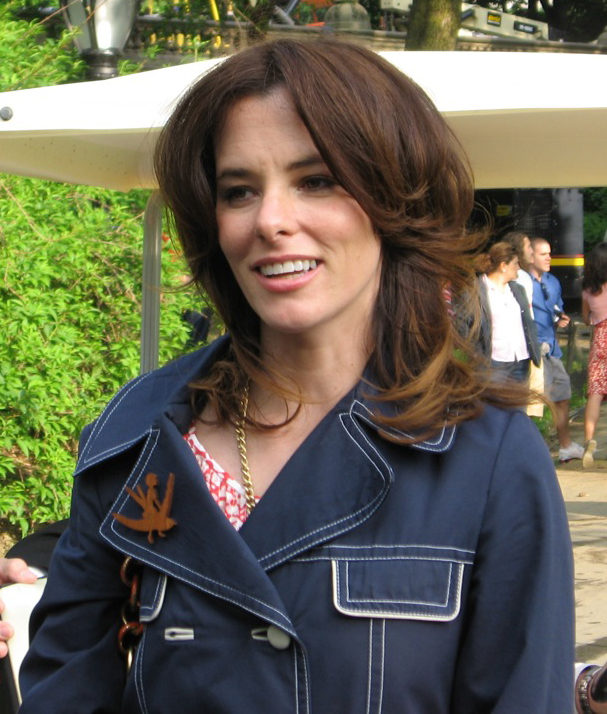
American actress Parker Posey played the role of Becky.

The writers of The Simpsons were told that actress Drew Barrymore wanted to guest star in the series and pitched several possible episodes for her. These included what became the plot of this episode, with Barrymore voicing Becky, as well as another that would see her voice Krusty the Clown's daughter. The latter idea was used for the season twelve episode "Insane Clown Poppy", with Barrymore appearing as Krusty's daughter. Parker Posey was selected to voice Becky instead. Larry Doyle wrote the episode's script and named Becky after his wife.

Posey came in for at least two or three sessions worth of recording. For Cyanide, the Poison tribute band, the producers unsuccessfully attempted to get Poison lead vocalist Bret Michaels to play the singer. Marc Wilmore, a writer on the show, voices one of the psychologists, formally known in the script as "Extra Guy". Scully gave the guest role to him as a thanks for his practical joke he played on fellow writer Matt Selman regarding East St. Louis and the season ten episode "They Saved Lisa's Brain". The producers got a censor note for the scene where Chief Wiggum teaches Ralph how to hold a gun in order to achieve a "kill shot".

Steven Dean Moore directed the episode. The episode's couch gag involves Korean animators coloring blank paint-by-numbers figures of The Simpsons; these caricatures are based on Korean animators who worked in the United States at Film Roman, the show's animation production company. The jimmies that Marge throws at the busboys are all variations of the character design that was used for the Squeaky Voiced Teen since the series' inception. At the time, the Simpsons writers thought the word "usurper" was funny, hence its numerous appearances in the episode. Selman, in the episode's audio commentary, recalled that it was hard to write so many misunderstandings; Scully commented, "It gives us a new appreciation for Three's Company."

== Cultural references ==
"It's a Mad, Mad, Mad, Mad Marge" features several references to popular culture. The title is a reference to It's a Mad, Mad, Mad, Mad World. In the episode, Otto meets Becky at Woodstock 1999, where he is on fire and the fire itself is put out by the water in her water bottle. This was a reference to a controversy about the high cost of water at the festival, and Otto being on fire references the large number of fires that occurred. Otto holds up a boombox and blares Poison's "Every Rose Has Its Thorn" whilst proposing to Becky. When Otto plays air guitar, it is completely accurate fingering: John Achenbach, a storyboard artist on the show, is an accomplished guitarist and provided demonstrations for the animators. The episode itself is a loose parody of the 1992 thriller film The Hand That Rocks the Cradle, when Marge's sister Selma mentions that "Marge finds herself in similar situation -- attractive guest tries to steal her place in the family". Becky's name is a reference to the film's main antagonist played by Rebecca De Mornay. When Krusty interviews Marge, it is a television static image of her face with an impersonator's lips in place of hers; this was an homage to a recurring skit from the show Late Night with Conan O'Brien in which Robert Smigel's lips would be placed on those of Bill Clinton or other famous people. The idea was created by Brent Forrester, a former writer for The Simpsons who in the early days of Late Night sent the joke to Conan O'Brien, also a former writer for The Simpsons. Patty and Selma's line "the bitterness is strong in this one," is a reference to Darth Vader's line "the Force is strong in this one" from the 1977 film Star Wars Episode IV: A New Hope.

At the beginning of the episode, when Principal Skinner assigns the students with film projects, he tells them in advance that he doesn't want to see 30 Blair Witch knock-offs, a reference to the 1999 found footage horror film The Blair Witch Project. The music that accompanies Homer’s use of a sly gadget to extract pastry segments from within Otto's wedding cake is an homage to the James Bond Theme.

== Release ==
The episode originally aired on the Fox network in the United States on May 14, 2000. On October 7, 2008, it was released on DVD as part of the box set The Simpsons – The Complete Eleventh Season. Staff members Mike Scully, George Meyer, Ian Maxtone-Graham, Matt Selman, Larry Doyle, and Steven Dean Moore participated in the DVD audio commentary for the episode. Deleted scenes from the episode were also included on the box set.

While reviewing the eleventh season of The Simpsons, DVD Movie Guide's Colin Jacobson commented: "Unusually, 'Mad' provides a pretty concise focus on only one story. The lead bit with Otto directly leads to the Marge plot, and it doesn’t go off on the usual tangents. ... And it works pretty well. 'Mad' isn’t the most inspired tale, but it does fine for itself."
