= Last Tap Dance in Springfield =

- The Simpsons episode
- Episode no.: Season 11; Episode 20
- Directed by: Nancy Kruse
- Written by: Julie Thacker
- Production code: BABF15
- Original air date: May 7, 2000

Guest appearance
- Frank Welker as Puma

Episode features
- Chalkboard gag: "I will not dance on anyone's grave"
- Couch gag: The living room is a jungle. Marge, Lisa, Bart, and Maggie swing in on a vine gracefully, like Tarzan. Homer, however, swings past the couch and crashes, like George of the Jungle.
- Commentary: Mike Scully; George Meyer; Ian Maxtone-Graham; Julie Thacker; Yeardley Smith; Nancy Kruse

Episode chronology
← Previous "Kill the Alligator and Run"	Next → "It's a Mad, Mad, Mad, Mad Marge"
- The Simpsons season 11

"Last Tap Dance in Springfield" is the twentieth episode of the eleventh season of the American animated television series The Simpsons. It originally aired on the Fox network in the United States on May 7, 2000. In the episode, Lisa decides to sign up for tap dancing lessons after being inspired by a film about a girl who enters a tango contest and wins. Meanwhile, Bart and Milhouse hide out at the mall to escape going to summer camp.

"Last Tap Dance in Springfield" was written by Julie Thacker, who based it on her own experiences with dance classes, and directed by Nancy Kruse. The episode has received mixed reviews from critics.

== Plot ==
On a trip to the mall, Homer sees an optometrist to get his eyes examined and gets laser surgery after rejecting a number of eyeglasses. After the surgery, Homer rejects the optometrist's advice to take eye drops to keep his eyes from crusting over, which he dismisses as an "add-on", shortly before his eyes do indeed crust over. While he is temporarily blinded, he gets tricked into driving to the liquor store to buy Jack Daniel's and "a carton of smokes" for Dolph, Jimbo, and Kearney, with the latter impersonating Marge's voice.

At the same time, Marge and Lisa find items for Bart's school camping trip. While watching the film Tango de La Muerte at the mall's cineplex, Lisa identifies with the main female character, a bookworm named "Lisabella" whom the tango champion asks to be his partner and with whom he then falls in love. This inspires Lisa to enroll at a dance school, where she wants to take tango classes, however is pushed into tap lessons by the school's owner, an obnoxious former child star named Vicki Valentine. Lisa's hopes of being a dancer are crushed when she finds that she is the worst dancer there, even being out-performed by Ralph Wiggum, and does not get any useful advice from Vicki about what she is doing wrong. She continues to attend the tap classes because she does not want to upset Homer and Marge.

When the school organizes a dance recital, Vicki refuses to let Lisa dance and relegates her to pulling the curtain to open the show (only to later decide that the curtain-pulling is too important for Lisa and instead do it herself). Professor Frink, overhearing, devises a plan to attach a device to Lisa's shoes that will make them automatically tap at any percussive sound. This allows her to mimic the other dancers and take part in the recital. She becomes a star at the show, even upstaging an enraged Vicki, but when the audience applauds her, her shoes go out of control. Homer stops the shoes from going haywire by tripping Lisa. Vicki finally seems to empathize with Lisa's desperation to be a star (though she notes that this involved her destroying Buddy Ebsen's credit rating, much to Homer and Marge's bemusement). As Lisa walks off with her parents, having decided that tap dancing is not for her, they encounter a Weasel Ball weaponized by Frink, which Homer chooses to play with despite Frink's warnings.

Meanwhile in the subplot, Bart and Milhouse sneak out of their camping trip after discovering that Nelson Muntz will be there with them with plans to regularly beat them both up. After Milhouse refuses to return home because his grandma is staying in his bed, they decide to hide in the mall for the duration, having shoe fights and causing havoc once the mall has closed. The next morning, the mall manager and Chief Wiggum see the mess that Bart and Milhouse have created and blindly jumps to the conclusion that it was caused by a giant rat, closing the mall as a result. He releases a puma inside the mall to catch the rat, but Bart and Milhouse use a ball of yarn to distract the puma and escape. Wiggum later sees a piece of red yarn hanging from the mountain lion's mouth and thinks it is the rat's tail, which prompts him to close the case and not focus on putting the puma back in its cage.

== Production and analysis ==
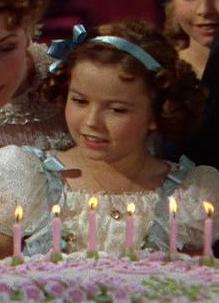
Lisa's dance teacher is based on American former child actress Shirley Temple, who was originally offered the role

"Last Tap Dance in Springfield" was written by Julie Thacker and directed by Nancy Kruse as part of the eleventh season of The Simpsons (1999–2000). Thacker came up with the story when she started enrolling her five daughters into dance classes during the summer. In a DVD audio commentary for the episode, she noted that she did not particularly like the teachers' methods and the other children's rude parents. Vicki Valentine, Lisa's tap dance teacher in the episode, is based on the American former child actress Shirley Temple. The character is voiced by regular cast member Tress MacNeille: the part was originally offered to Temple herself, but she was unable to record the role. According to Pamela Klaffke, author of the 2003 book Spree: A Cultural History of Shopping, the idea of "being trapped inside the walls of a store or mall" had become a "cinematic cliché" by the time this episode aired. She believes this cliché is what prompted the writers to do the story featuring Bart and Milhouse.

== Release ==
The episode originally aired on the Fox network in the United States on May 7, 2000. On October 7, 2008, it was released on DVD as part of the box set The Simpsons – The Complete Eleventh Season. Staff members Mike Scully, George Meyer, Ian Maxtone-Graham, Julie Thacker, Yeardley Smith, and Nancy Kruse participated in the DVD audio commentary for the episode. Deleted scenes from the episode were also included on the box set.

== Reception ==
"Last Tap Dance in Springfield" has received mixed reception from critics.

While reviewing the eleventh season of The Simpsons, DVD Movie Guide's Colin Jacobson commented that neither the plot involving Lisa nor the subplot featuring Bart and Milhouse "excels", but that the latter is "the superior of the two plots". He added that "We get some decent laughs from both of them and that’s about it."
