= Grift of the Magi =

- The Simpsons episode
- Episode no.: Season 11; Episode 9
- Directed by: Matthew Nastuk
- Written by: Tom Martin
- Production code: BABF07
- Original air date: December 19, 1999

Guest appearances
- Tim Robbins as Jim Hope; Clarence Clemons as the Narrator; Gary Coleman as himself; Joe Mantegna as Fat Tony

Episode features
- Chalkboard gag: (first) Bart writes "I will not sell my kidney on eBay"/(second) Lisa writes "I will not do math in class"
- Couch gag: Marge, Lisa, Bart, and Maggie slide down a fire pole to the couch. Homer, however, gets stuck in the hole and flails about helplessly.
- Commentary: Matt Groening; Mike Scully; George Meyer; Ian Maxtone-Graham; Tom Martin; Matt Selman; Tim Long; Lance Kramer

Episode chronology
← Previous "Take My Wife, Sleaze"	Next → "Little Big Mom"
- The Simpsons season 11

"Grift of the Magi" is the ninth episode of the eleventh season of the American animated television series The Simpsons. Being the final episode to air in the 1990s, it originally aired on the Fox network in the United States on December 19, 1999. In the episode, mafia boss Fat Tony successfully extorts a large sum of money from Springfield Elementary School, forcing Principal Skinner to close it down. However, a toy company called Kid First Industries, led by Jim Hope, later buys the school and privatizes it. Classes now start focusing on toys and marketing only, and soon a new toy called Funzo that resembles the children's ideas is released by Kid First Industries in time for the Christmas shopping season. Bart and Lisa decide to destroy all Funzos in Springfield but Gary Coleman, Kid First Industries' security guard, tries to intercept them.

"Grift of the Magi", which satirizes the commercialization of Christmas, was written by Tom Martin and directed by Matthew Nastuk. The episode features several guest appearances; Tim Robbins as Jim Hope, Gary Coleman as himself, Joe Mantegna as Fat Tony, and Clarence Clemons as a narrator that tells the viewers at the end of the episode how the story ends.

Around 7.76 million American homes tuned in to watch the episode during its original airing. It was first released on DVD in 2003 in a collection of five Christmas-related Simpsons episodes, titled Christmas With the Simpsons.

Critics have given "Grift of the Magi" generally mixed reviews, particularly because of its plot. The episode has been praised for some of its gags and Coleman's appearance.

== Plot ==
Bart and Milhouse have to remain inside The Simpsons house when an ozone hole moves over Springfield. The two dress up as ladies and jump on Homer and Marge's bed, singing "Sisters Are Doin' It for Themselves". When Homer comes in abruptly, Bart falls off of the bed and lands on a bowling ball, breaking his coccyx. Dr. Hibbert informs Homer and Marge that Bart will have to use a wheelchair until the bone heals. When Bart arrives at Springfield Elementary School the following day, he cannot enter because the school lacks ramps for the disabled. As Principal Skinner considers a ramp for the school, mafia boss Fat Tony suggests that his construction company could build it. Although the new ramp system collapses, Fat Tony informs Skinner that the construction cost $200,000 and that the school will still have to pay. Principal Skinner closes Springfield Elementary due to lack of funds.

Jim Hope, president of toy company Kid First Industries, privatizes the school. The staff are replaced, and classes now focus on toys and marketing. After Lisa is sent to detention for doing math in marketing class, she discovers a secret room behind the blackboard; the company is using students for research to make a toy for Christmas. Lisa tries to show the evidence to Homer, Marge and Chief Wiggum, but the company destroys the room beforehand, humiliating her. When Bart and Lisa are back at home, they see an advertisement for a toy named Funzo, which has many features suggested by Springfield Elementary students during brainstorming sessions at the school. They visit Hope's office to complain, and he apologetically gives them a Funzo toy. Bart and Lisa discover that Funzo is programmed to destroy other toys.

On Christmas Eve, with Homer's help, the two steal all the Funzo toys from underneath every Christmas tree in Springfield, intending to burn them in the town's tire fire. Gary Coleman, who is a Kid First Industries security guard, arrives to stop them. The two parties argue all night; in the morning they settle down into civilized discussion about the commercialization of Christmas. Coleman changes his opinion about the toy company and helps the Simpsons destroy the Funzo toys. Coleman accepts Homer's invitation to Christmas dinner at the Simpsons', cancelling his Christmas plans with George Clooney. Burns shows up, having been visited by three ghosts that night; he has decided to donate to Springfield Elementary.

== Production ==
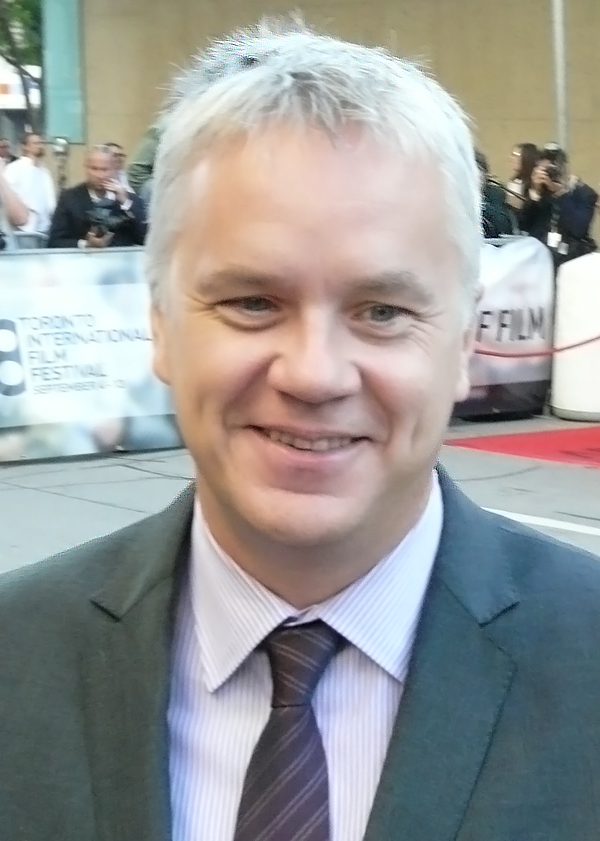
Tim Robbins guest-starred in the episode as Jim Hope.

"Grift of the Magi" was written by Tom Martin and directed by Matthew Nastuk as part of the eleventh season of The Simpsons (1999–2000). It was the first episode that Martin wrote on his own, having previously co-written the season ten episode "Sunday, Cruddy Sunday" with George Meyer, Brian Scully, and The Simpsons showrunner Mike Scully. Martin got the inspiration for "Grift of the Magi" after reading a magazine article about how major companies were receiving permission to advertise their products in school students' textbooks. He thought it "seemed like a gigantic conflict that could lead to big problems", and therefore believed an episode based on it would be a good idea. According to DVD Talk reviewer Adam Tyner, the episode is a satire of the commercialization of Christmas. A writer for Newsday has commented that episode skewers "the annual craze for that one 'hot' toy." This has also been pointed out by Mike Scully, who said in 2008 that "Grift of the Magi" was produced around the time when "every year there seemed to be a hot toy. Like the Furbies, or whatever – some toy that kids just had to have that year." In response to Scully's comment, Martin added that every year "the media would create this gigantic rush at the toy store for various things. This [episode] was coming on the heels of, yeah, the Furby."

Guest stars in the episode include Tim Robbins as Jim Hope, Gary Coleman as himself, Joe Mantegna as Fat Tony, and Clarence Clemons as a narrator. Scully thought Robbins "did a great job" because the Simpsons staff wanted the character of Jim Hope to be "fun and upbeat and somebody the kids would love." Clemons narrates a few scenes at the end of the episode, telling the viewers how the story ends. When Coleman agrees to spend Christmas with the Simpsons, Clemons says, for example: "And Gary Coleman was as good as his word, and as for old Mr. Burns, he was visited by three ghosts during the night and agreed to fund the school with some money he found in his tuxedo pants." Shortly after Coleman's death in 2010, an article appeared in the newspaper El Comercio that noted that "the nod to the harsh reality of Gary Coleman in [the episode] is given: in real life a few years ago Gary had to make a living as a shop security guard."

== Release ==
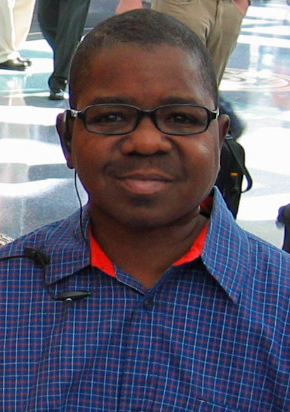
Gary Coleman's performance in the episode was praised by critics.

"Grift of the Magi" originally aired on the Fox network in the United States on December 19, 1999. It was viewed in approximately 7.76 million households that night. With a Nielsen rating of 7.7, the episode finished 39th in the ratings for the week of December 13–19, 1999 (tied with an episode of the American Broadcasting Company (ABC)'s 20/20). It was the second highest-rated broadcast on Fox that week, following an episode of Ally McBeal (which received a 9.9 rating). On October 14, 2003, "Grift of the Magi" was released in the United States on a DVD collection titled Christmas With the Simpsons, along with the season one episode "Simpsons Roasting on an Open Fire", the season four episode "Mr. Plow", the season nine episode "Miracle on Evergreen Terrace", and the season thirteen episode "She of Little Faith". On October 7, 2008, the episode was released on DVD again as part of the box set The Simpsons – The Complete Eleventh Season. Staff members Martin, Scully, Meyer, Matt Groening, Ian Maxtone-Graham, Matt Selman, Tim Long, and Lance Kramer participated in the DVD audio commentary for "Grift of the Magi". Deleted scenes from the episode were also included on the box set.

== Reception ==
Since airing, "Grift of the Magi" has received generally mixed reviews from critics. While reviewing the eleventh season of The Simpsons, DVD Movie Guide's Colin Jacobson commented that the episode "feels like an amalgamation of elements from prior holiday programs and never really elicits much humor. Christmas is commercialized and corporations use and abuse their customers? Those aren’t exactly rich insights, so ['Grift of the Magi'] comes across as a below average episode." In his review of the DVD Christmas With the Simpsons, Digitally Obsessed critic Joel Cunningham wrote that the episode "comes from Season 11, well past the point when the series had sacrificed character for absurdist humor. Unless you don't think evil toy marketers, sentient Furbys, and Gary Coleman qualify. Anyway, after the school nearly goes bankrupt, Principal Skinner signs a contract with corporate backers who use the kids to conduct market research. There are some good gags, but the story doesn't hang together very well." Adam Tyner of DVD Talk argued that the episode "has a couple of good gags (Gary Coleman chatting on the phone being my favorite) but is quickly forgettable". Brian James of PopMatters described Coleman's cameo as "hysterical" in 2004, and Meghan Lewit of the same website listed "Grift of the Magi" at number eight on her 2009 list of the "10 best holiday themed TV episodes."
