= Brother's Little Helper =

- The Simpsons episode
- Bart, under the effects of Focusyn, becomes an insane conspiracy theorist convinced that Major League Baseball is spying on the town using satellites. The staff debated on whether Bart's pupils should be bigger or smaller than normal while on the drug.
- Episode no.: Season 11; Episode 2
- Directed by: Mark Kirkland
- Written by: George Meyer
- Production code: AABF22
- Original air date: October 3, 1999

Guest appearance
- Mark McGwire as himself

Episode features
- Chalkboard gag: "Pork is not a verb"
- Couch gag: The Simpsons are blank paint-by-numbers figures; Asian animators come in and color the family, but do not detail their eyes.
- Commentary: Mike Scully; George Meyer; Mark Kirkland; Ian Maxtone-Graham; Matt Selman; Tim Long

Episode chronology
← Previous "Beyond Blunderdome"	Next → "Guess Who's Coming to Criticize Dinner?"
- The Simpsons season 11

"Brother's Little Helper" is the second episode of the eleventh season of the American animated television series The Simpsons. It first aired on the Fox network in the United States on October 3, 1999. In the episode, Bart floods the school gymnasium and the schoolyard, which prompts the school's principal Seymour Skinner to diagnose Bart with ADHD despite not being a qualified medical practitioner or psychiatrist. Bart is prescribed a psychostimulant drug called Focusyn (a parody of Ritalin) and which sounds similar to the related drug Focalin (a drug released six years after the episode aired), and initially starts paying more attention to his studies. After a while however, Bart starts turning psychotic and is convinced that Major League Baseball is watching over the people of Springfield.

The episode was directed by director Mark Kirkland and was the first episode staff writer George Meyer received a sole writing credit for since the season 5 episode "Bart's Inner Child". Meyer, who was facing some psychological difficulties while writing the episode, felt so dissatisfied with the episode's first draft that he turned it in with a pseudonym. The episode satirizes the perceived misdiagnosis of behavioral disorders in children, which was a controversial topic at the time the episode was written.

The episode features former Major League Baseball player Mark McGwire as himself. Following its broadcast, the episode was positively received by critics.

== Plot ==
Bart is behaving wildly and recklessly: he teases and exasperates Principal Skinner, and floods the gymnasium and the schoolyard (coincidentally saving Ned Flanders, who had caught fire). Skinner informs Homer and Marge that Bart has attention deficit disorder (ADD). To prevent his expulsion, Skinner recommends that Bart take a new untested experimental drug called Focusyn.

Taking the drug, Bart becomes an eager and diligent student. His parents think they can safely go out for an intimate evening together, but when they come home, a paranoid Bart has wrapped himself in aluminum foil, with a garbage can lid on his head, and numerous coat hangers dangling from the ceiling, claiming that Major League Baseball is spying on the town via satellite. The doctors recommend that Bart be weaned off Focusyn, which turns out to be highly addictive and hallucinogenic due to an oversight in the manufacturing process, but he refuses, swallows several handfuls of the pills and runs away.

Bart enters a U.S. Army base and manages to steal a tank. He cuts a swath of destruction through the town and eventually stops at the school. There, persuaded not to destroy the school or any other building, he points the tank's cannon into the sky and shoots down a Major League Baseball satellite; inside are detailed documents on everybody's behavior. Mark McGwire appears, distracts the citizens with a long home run, and hides all the evidence under his cap. Marge takes Bart off Focusyn for good and puts him on Ritalin, which seemingly cures him. Major League Baseball, however, is still spying on the Simpson family: the autographed bat that McGwire gave Bart has a hidden camera.

== Production ==
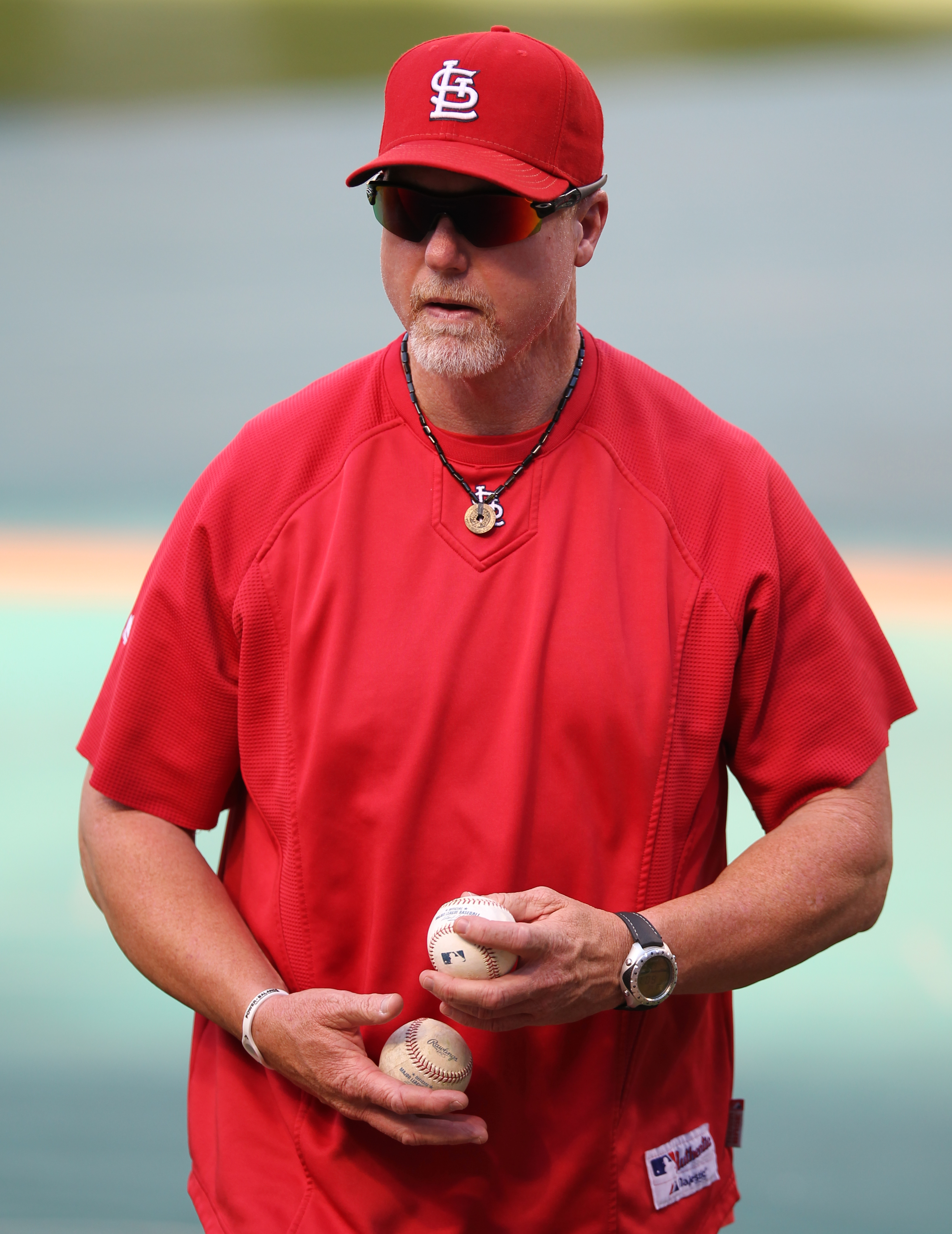
Then Major League Baseball player Mark McGwire guest starred as himself in the episode.

"Brother's Little Helper", which was originally called "Bart a Go Go", was written by staff writer George Meyer and directed by director Mark Kirkland. It was first broadcast on the Fox network in the United States on October 3, 1999. After the season 5 episode "Bart's Inner Child", Meyer got "a little burned out on writing scripts", so he wrote "Brother's Little Helper" in order to "try [his] hand again". While writing the episode, Meyer was going through "some psychological problems" and found the episode very difficult to write. He was initially so dissatisfied with the first draft that he turned it in with a pseudonym; Vance Jericho. Co-producer Tim Long jokingly commented that the script was "literally moist with contempt" but went on to say that it was in fact "an amazing draft". The writers discussed what sort of rampage Bart would go on during the second act, and writer Matt Selman suggested that Bart obtain a tank. In the DVD audio commentary for the episode, Selman stated that he got the idea from watching a news report about "a guy" who had died while "[going] nuts with a tank".

To show the side effects Focusyn had on Bart, the animators made slight changes to his face as the episode progressed. It is first seen in the scene where Bart is reading "The 7 Habits of Highly Effective Pre-teens": a cheek line is added just under his eyes to suggest that he is starting to change. In another scene, Bart can be seen speed reading and later on, the animators drew him with "mini-pupils". The staff discussed whether Bart's pupils would be bigger or smaller than normal while he is on the drug. The writers settled on smaller pupils and, according to Kirkland, "several model sheets were going back and forth over the fax machines" until the staff were satisfied with the size of Bart's pupils while influenced by the drug. In fact, psychostimulants used to treat ADHD are more likely to cause pupils to become bigger (dilated).

In the scene where he escapes the laboratory, Bart can be seen swallowing a handful of pills on his way out. Originally, Bart was supposed to "upend" an entire jar of Focusyn, but, according to Meyer, the censors wouldn't allow it. The scientists who prescribe Focusyn to Bart are based on one of The Simpsons' staff members and his wife. They were voiced by Hank Azaria and Tress MacNeille, respectively. Azaria also voiced Sir Widebottom, one of the clowns in Krusty's car, as well as one of the marine soldiers. Then Major League Baseball player Mark McGwire guest starred as himself in the episode. Mike Scully, an executive producer and the show runner for the episode, commented that McGwire was "probably the biggest man [he'd] ever seen" and that he "did a great job for [them]".

== Themes and cultural references ==
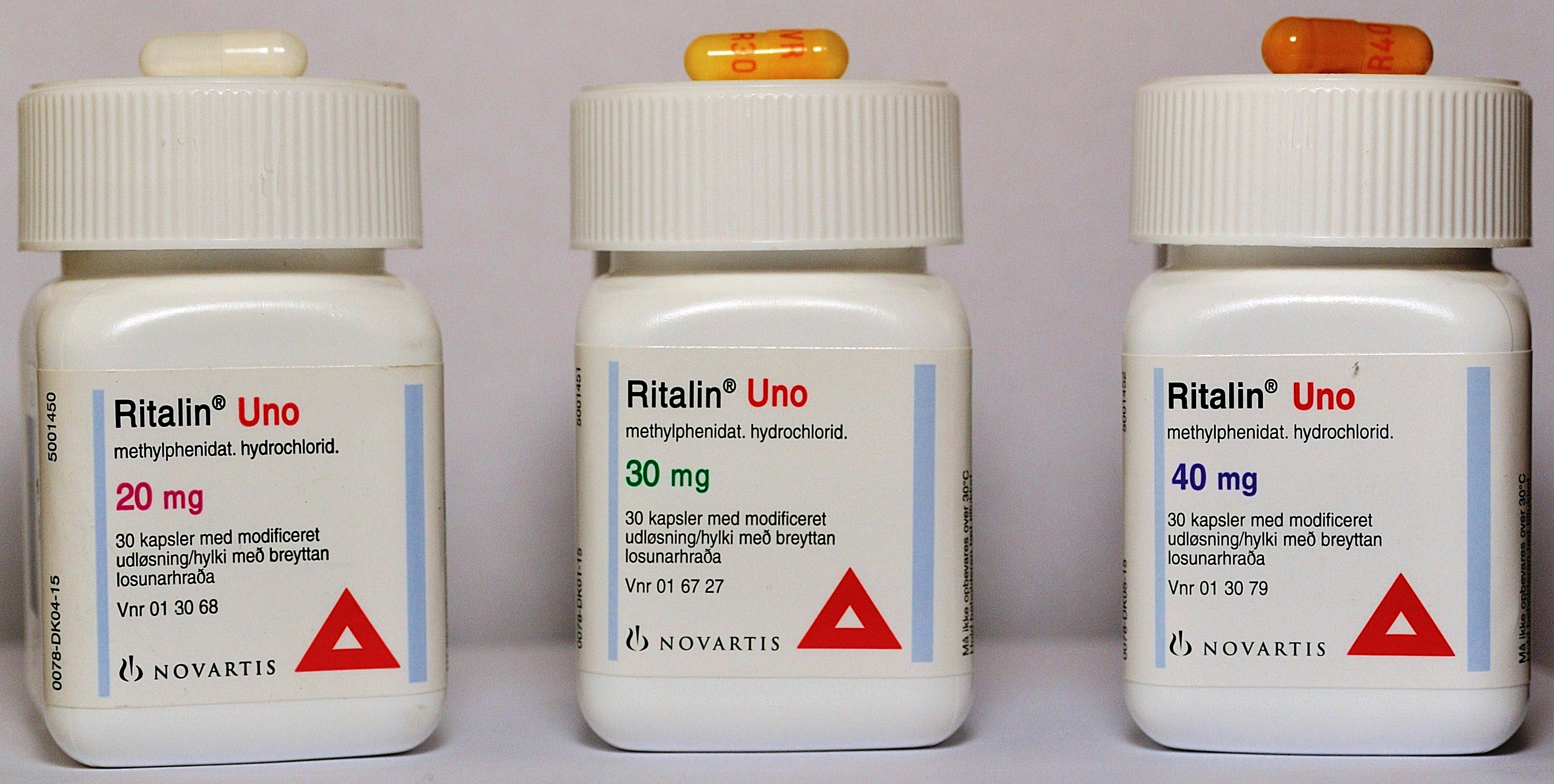
Focusyn, a fictional drug which is a spoof of Ritalin, (pictured) is prominently featured throughout the episode.

According to Genevieve Koski, Josh Modell, Noel Murray, Sean O'Neal, Kyle Ryan, and Scott Tobias of The A.V. Club, the '90s saw a "dramatic increase" in diagnoses of behavioral disorders, such as ADHD, in children, and debates over whether or not to medicate children with concentration difficulties were heated. Meyer, inspired by the debates, decided to write the episode to be about the subject. The episode criticizes how children with school issues are being misdiagnosed as having ADHD, as well as the prescription of psychostimulants to children in general. This in particular is shown in a scene in the Springfield Elementary schoolyard. In the scene, it is revealed that the general populace of the school is medicated for various misdiagnosed behavior disorders. Meyer himself was not entirely sure about his stance on the issue, however. He stated that "for all I know, the drugs help [the children] and help the world." However, he went on to say that "I just have a feeling they're gonna be a disaster. Down the line."

Focusyn, the fictional psychoactive drug that is prominently featured throughout the episode, is based on the real-life medicine Ritalin, which is used to treat disorders such as ADHD. Hosey the Bear, which can be seen in the beginning of the episode, is a reference to the United States Forest Service's mascot Smokey Bear. After Bart has flooded the school gym, Skinner can be seen wiping mud off his eyes in an homage to American actor Oliver Hardy. The sequence of Bart stealing an army tank and destroying half of Springfield under the influence of mind-altering substances is likely a reference to Shawn Nelson, a man infamous for a similar, albeit serious, incident. A scene in the episode shows Marge standing in front of the tank Bart has stolen. The scene is a reference to Tank Man, the anonymous man who stood in the way of a column of tanks the morning after the Chinese military forcibly removed pro-democracy protesters from Beijing's Tiananmen Square.

Other things referenced include the film Showgirls (1995), which Homer and Marge go to see. Homer says that, since taking Focusyn, Bart has gone "from Goofus to Gallant", a reference to the characters Goofus and Gallant from the children's magazine Highlights. When Lou sketches Bart based on Homer and Marge's description he ends up drawing Dennis from the American comic strip Dennis the Menace. A shirt at the military base Fort Fragg reads "I Went to the Persian Gulf and All I Got Was This Lousy Syndrome", a reference to Gulf War syndrome. During Bart's rampage through the town in a tank, he sings the chorus of "Don't Stop" by Fleetwood Mac.

== Reception ==
In its original American broadcast on October 3, 1999, "Brother's Little Helper" finished at no. 51 in the ratings, according to Nielsen Media Research, making it the most watched television program on Fox that night. Despite being the most watched program of the network, the ratings were considered disappointing by the Deseret News. On October 7, 2008, the episode was released as part of The Simpsons - The Complete Eleventh Season DVD box set. Mike Scully, George Meyer, Mark Kirkland, Ian Maxtone-Graham, Matt Selman and Tim Long participated in the DVD audio commentary of the episode.

Following its broadcast, "Brother's Little Helper" received positive reviews from critics.

About nine years after its original broadcast, Robert Canning of IGN posted a "flashback review" of "Brother's Little Helper". Canning, calling the episode "funny" and "a standout episode in this later season", was particularly fond of the episode's opening. However, he was less impressed with the third act of the episode, calling it "lackluster". He felt that the part involving Mark McGwire was "a silly cop out" and that it wasn't as funny as what was leading up to it. He also stated that he was put off by the writers wanting to come across a message. "It's not that I necessarily disagreed with this sentiment", Canning wrote, "but at the time, I didn't think I needed to be taught a lesson while I watched The Simpsons. I still don't." He did, however, "love" the "tag back" to the volunteer fire department seen in the beginning of the episode, and "the fact that they can't find how to fight a satellite fire in their handbook".

In his review of The Simpsons - The Complete Eleventh Season, Brian Tallerico of The Deadbolt considered "Brother's Little Helper" to be one of the season's best episodes.

Colin Jacobsson of DVD Movie Guide was favorable as well, calling the episode "pretty good" and that it "provides some good laughs". He especially liked seeing Bart well-behaved. He also appreciated the episode's message, writing that "the show offers a clever spotlight on [the] issue". He did, however, dislike the characterization of Bart. He wrote that Bart is normally "not particularly overactive or distractible", and that the writers "trie[d] to make [Bart] seem more hyper than normal". He concluded by saying that "Bart's a behavior problem but not ADHD."

Five months after the episode aired, Bill Clinton, who served as president of the United States at the time, held the first ever White House conference on Mental Health. Scripps Howard News Service columnist Deroy Murdock mentioned the timeliness of the conference in connection with the episode as being an instance of The Simpsons "clairvoyantly predict[ing] the news".

In 2007, the fictional word "exorcism tongs" appeared in Cracked.com's list "From Cromulent to Craptacular: The Top 12 Simpsons Created Words", ranking in at number 10. The word is used in a scene in which Homer eats a mixture of taffy and Focusyn, which puts him in a "mildly hallucinogenic state". Seeing this, Todd Flanders asks his father, Ned, "Does Mr. Simpson have a demon, daddy?" To which Ned replies, "Looks like it. Run and get daddy's exorcism tongs." About the word, Mark Peters and Daniel O' Brien of Cracked.com wrote "We'd be lying if we said we didn't go out to every Christian-themed general store in the country hoping to acquire our very own set of exorcism tongs the day this episode aired."
