= Pygmoelian =

- The Simpsons episode
- Moe (right), after plastic surgery, plays Dr. Tad Winslow on a soap opera thanks to his new handsome face
- Episode no.: Season 11; Episode 16
- Directed by: Mark Kirkland
- Written by: Larry Doyle
- Production code: BABF12
- Original air date: February 27, 2000

Episode features
- Chalkboard gag: "Dodgeball stops at the gym door"
- Couch gag: The Simpsons sit down as normal. Marge notices the name “Matt Groening” written on the carpet, gets up, and wipes the name off. Matt Groening then comes in and rewrites his name on the floor.
- Commentary: Mike Scully; George Meyer; Larry Doyle; Matt Selman; Carolyn Omine; Mark Kirkland

Episode chronology
← Previous "Missionary: Impossible"	Next → "Bart to the Future"
- The Simpsons season 11

"Pygmoelian" is the sixteenth episode of the eleventh season of the American animated television series The Simpsons. It originally aired on the Fox network in the United States on February 27, 2000. In the episode, after getting his face censored out on the Duff Beer calendar for not being photogenic, Moe Szyslak gets plastic surgery and becomes the star of a popular soap opera.

== Plot ==
After being tricked into evacuating the house by Homer, who had set off the fire alarm early in the morning, the family goes to the Duff Days festival sponsored by Duff Beer. While there, they see Moe Szyslak enter a bartending competition and win the grand prize of having his photo taken for the upcoming Duff calendar. However, when the calendar goes on sale, Moe is dismayed to find his face covered by several layers of stickers due to his ugliness. He takes Lenny and Carl up on their suggestion that he have plastic surgery; although he is reluctant to go through with the procedure, it leaves him with a handsome face. Filled with new confidence, he confronts old adversaries, including the producers of the soap opera It Never Ends, complaining that he was rejected for the part of Dr. Tad Winslow 25 years earlier because of his appearance. When the actor portraying the role is fired after demanding a salary increase, the producers hire Moe to replace him.

Meanwhile, Bart and Lisa discover that Maggie's pink Duff Days elephant balloon has blown away in the wind. They go after it until it ends up in a gay Republican coalition's office where the members are discussing what their mascot should be. One member dismisses the pink elephant as being too precise about their group's identity. They then give Lisa a bumper sticker supporting a gay president in 2084, admitting that they have to be realistic about their long-term goals.

Taping of It Never Ends goes well until Moe reads in a top-secret book of future plot lines that his character is to be killed off. Infuriated, he gets revenge by revealing all the plots on the air, with help from Homer. The producer angrily interrupts to tell Moe that his character's death was meant to be part of a dream sequence, as indicated by the book's color-coding of pages that Moe had remembered incorrectly, and fires him. Moe confidently states that he can get a role on any other soap opera he wants, but as he is leaving, a set piece falls on his face and crushes it back to its original appearance. His life returns to normal at the bar, where he wonders how the accident left him with his original face instead of an entirely new one.

== Production and themes ==
"Pygmoelian" was written by Larry Doyle and directed by Mark Kirkland as part of the eleventh season of The Simpsons (1999–2000).

In a 2007 article, Slant critic Ed Gonzales noted that in relation to the episode's primary story of Moe's plastic surgery, the subplot of Bart and Lisa chasing Maggie's pink elephant balloon into a meeting for gay Republicans serves as "a seemingly arbitrary bit of nonsense that connects succinctly with the theme of identity in which a person changes their face only to realize the efficiency of their old one."

== Release ==
The episode originally aired on the Fox network in the United States on February 27, 2000. On October 7, 2008, it was released on DVD as part of the box set The Simpsons – The Complete Eleventh Season. Staff members Mike Scully, George Meyer, Larry Doyle, Matt Selman, Carolyn Omine, and Mark Kirkland participated in the DVD audio commentary for the episode. Deleted scenes from the episode were also included on the box set.

== Reception ==
Reception of the episode from critics has been generally positive.

Brendan Dando & Guy Davis of the Four Finger Discount podcast describe this as one of the strongest episodes of the season. Davis explains, "No line goes wasted, even the simple moments like Lenny, Carl and Homer walking into Moe's have laugh-out-loud one liners." Dando credits Duffman as one of the episode's highlights, along with the spot-on spoof of daytime soap opera intros.

Ed Gonzales of Slant called it a "great episode."

DVD Movie Guide's Colin Jacobson commented that the episode "peaks early, as the scenes at 'Duff Days' provide the most amusement." He added that "It’s nice to see a focus on Moe for once, but the tale itself fails to really ignite. Though not a poor episode, it’s pretty flat after the opening."

In 2009, writers for IGN listed a line by Moe from this episode among their top eight favorite Moe quotes. The line was "Yeah, hey, I've got a gift. As a child, I was bitten by the acting bug. Then it burrowed under my skin and laid eggs in my heart. Now those eggs are hatching and I... the feeling is indescribable." Homer responds to this by saying "I know what you mean. Our dog had that." The IGN writers commented that "We've never heard anyone describe their life's passion as a parasitic infestation, and we hope we never have to. The cherry on top of this little nugget of Moe goodness is Homer's nonchalant reaction. He's probably used to Moe's strange, gross remarks by now."

In his review of the eleventh season of The Simpsons, Den of Geek critic Mark Oakley wrote that the "cobbled-together feel to the series stops it from reaching the heights of a few years before." Oakley blamed this on lazy writing, and added that "Proof of this comes when, on more than once occasion, the scripts include get-out clauses for the ridiculous storylines being churned out." He gave "Pygmoelian" as an example, commenting: "Moe has cosmetic surgery. However, at the show’s end his more familiar face is suddenly returned to him following an accident and the fact that this happens without horrendously disfiguring him is pondered upon by Moe himself as the credits roll. Playing this card once might be funny, but after three or four times it’s just plain lazy."
