= Missionary: Impossible =

- The Simpsons episode
- Episode no.: Season 11; Episode 15
- Directed by: Steven Dean Moore
- Written by: Ron Hauge
- Production code: BABF11
- Original air date: February 20, 2000

Guest appearance
- Betty White as herself

Episode features
- Chalkboard gag: "A belch is not an oral report"
- Couch gag: The living room is a subway station. The family (seated on a bench) get on the next train that arrives on the track and leave.
- Commentary: Mike Scully; George Meyer; Ron Hauge; Ian Maxtone-Graham; Matt Selman; Steven Dean Moore

Episode chronology
← Previous "Alone Again, Natura-Diddily"	Next → "Pygmoelian"
- The Simpsons season 11

"Missionary: Impossible" is the fifteenth episode of the eleventh season of the American television series The Simpsons. It originally aired on the Fox network in the United States on February 20, 2000. In the episode, Homer gets in trouble with PBS after confessing he does not have $10,000 to give them for their pledge drive, and ends up a missionary on a South Pacific island. It was directed by Steven Dean Moore and was the final episode written by Ron Hauge.

== Plot ==
In an attempt to end a PBS pledge drive which interrupts a favorite show of his (a Thames Television British sitcom titled Do Shut Up), Homer anonymously pledges $10,000 to the network. However he is traced by the network, who press him for the money, but when it quickly becomes apparent that he cannot pay, he is chased by pledge drive host Betty White and a mob of PBS personalities (including the cast of Do Shut Up, Fred Rogers, Yo-Yo Ma, the Teletubbies, Big Bird, Oscar the Grouch, and Elmo). Homer claims sanctuary in the church, where Reverend Lovejoy gets the heat off him by sending him to be a missionary in Microatia via a plane marked "Christian Relief", even though he has little religious faith and knowledge of Christianity (such as mispronouncing Jesus as Jeebus).

Homer arrives on an island and meets the outgoing missionaries, Craig and Amy (who immediately leave as soon as Homer arrives), and the natives, including a native girl who he names Lisa Jr. because she sounds just like Lisa. After initially despairing that there is no television or beer, and resorting to licking frogs for their hallucinogenic poison, Homer tries to teach them about religion, but realizes that he knows nothing. Instead, he decides to build a casino, introducing the natives to alcohol (brewed from holy water), gambling, gluttony, and violence to the island, ruining their virtuous way of life.

After the failure of the casino, Homer builds a chapel in penance, but he and Lisa Jr. ring the bell too loudly, causing an earthquake that releases a river of lava. As the two are about to sink to their deaths in the lava, the scene cuts to another pledge drive – this time, however, for the Fox network. It is revealed that The Simpsons itself is in danger of cancellation, while the entire network is facing financial hardship. Various Fox show personalities, including a cranky Rupert Murdoch, are manning the phones; the host is again Betty White, who entreats the viewers to help keep "crude, low-brow programming", such as Family Guy, on air. A caller pledges $10,000; Murdoch excitedly tells them that they have saved the network. The caller is revealed to be Bart, who responds to Murdoch's declaration by saying "Wouldn't be the first time".

== Production ==
"Missionary: Impossible" was written by Ron Hauge and directed by Steven Dean Moore as part of the eleventh season of the show (1999–2000). Betty White's role was originally written for Mary Tyler Moore. Moore was unavailable, so they asked White, who accepted the role.

== Cultural references ==
In the beginning of the episode Homer is watching a program called Do Shut Up, described as "a delicious British sitcom about a hard-drinking yet loving family of soccer hooligans". British English expressions terms used in the sitcom include "noggin", "wanker", and "soddin".

== Reception ==
Reception of the episode has been mostly positive.

Jeff Cotton of The Observer characterizes the episode as "A Classic". Cotton notes: "There's a big finish, and one of those jokes at Fox's expense you know they wouldn't allow if The Simpsons wasn't their biggest cash cow."

In a review of the episode for The Gazette, Alex Strachan writes: "'Missionary: Impossible' ... may not be the funniest Simpsons episode ever made. But it has some of the funniest lines about TV." Strachan quotes Homer's description of the television program Do Shut Up to Bart – "If they're not having a go with a bird, they're having a row with a wanker!" – as one of the funniest moments in the episode, but the line was cut from the British broadcast, as "wanker" is considered profanity in the UK.

Writing in his review of the episode for The Simpsons 11th season DVD release, Colin Jacobson of DVD Movie Guide is critical of an "inane" choice by the producers to have Homer refer to Jesus as "Jeebus". However, Jacobson gives the episode a positive review overall: "Highlighted by a fun turn from Betty White, the PBS segment amuses, and the pieces with Homer on the island do nicely as well. Despite 'Jeebus', this becomes arguably Season 11’s best episode."

"Missionary: Impossible" was also named the best episode of the eleventh season of The Simpsons by IGN writers Robert Canning, Eric Goldman, Dan Iverson, and Brian Zoromski. They highlighted scenes "such as the building of the 'Lucky Savage' casino and the destruction of Homer's chapel by an earthquake and a river of lava," but also noted that "Some of the episode's best humor is back in Springfield, after Homer makes Bart the man of the house – as Bart fills in for Homer at the nuclear plant, Mr. Burns berates 'Homer' for his poor performance record, gets tired of talking and ends up just poking Bart with a stick. Betty White also gives a great guest performance as herself, hosting a PBS telethon and ridiculing those viewers who watch but don't send in contributions."

The episode has become study material for sociology courses at University of California, Berkeley, where it is used to "examine issues of the production and reception of cultural objects, in this case, a satirical cartoon show", and to figure out what it is "trying to tell audiences about aspects primarily of American society, and, to a lesser extent, about other societies." Some questions asked in the courses include: "What aspects of American society are being addressed in the episode? What aspects of them are used to make the points? How is the satire conveyed: through language? Drawing? Music? Is the behavior of each character consistent with his/her character as developed over the years? Can we identify elements of the historical/political context that the writers are satirizing? What is the difference between satire and parody?"

A New York Times blog mentions an article in L'Osservatore Romano claiming Homer is a "good Catholic" and disputes it with a clip from this episode in which Homer "memorably" declares, "I'm no missionary, I don't even believe in Jeebus!" seconds before uttering the despairing plea, "Save me, Jeebus!"
