= Hello Gutter, Hello Fadder =

- The Simpsons episode
- Episode no.: Season 11; Episode 6
- Directed by: Mike B. Anderson
- Written by: Al Jean
- Production code: BABF02
- Original air date: November 14, 1999

Guest appearances
- Penn & Teller as themselves; Ron Howard as himself; Pat O'Brien as himself; Nancy O'Dell as herself

Episode features
- Chalkboard gag: "I won't not use no double negatives"
- Couch gag: A cement truck pours out concrete versions of the family onto the couch, but Homer's figure dries out quickly and crumbles at his feet.
- Commentary: Mike Scully; Al Jean; George Meyer; Ian Maxtone-Graham; Matt Selman; Mike B. Anderson

Episode chronology
← Previous "E-I-E-I-(Annoyed Grunt)"	Next → "Eight Misbehavin'"
- The Simpsons season 11

"Hello Gutter, Hello Fadder" is the sixth episode of the eleventh season of the American animated television series The Simpsons. It originally aired on the Fox network in the United States on November 14, 1999. In the episode, Homer becomes a local celebrity after bowling a perfect game, but his fame quickly fades as "yesterday's news". After a botched suicide attempt, Homer decides to spend time with Maggie after seeing Ron Howard spend time with his children. Howard guest-starred as himself in the episode, which also features guest appearances by Penn & Teller, Pat O'Brien, and Nancy O'Dell.

== Plot ==
Homer is extremely late for work after sleeping for more than a whole day. As punishment for his lateness, Mr. Burns makes Homer eat toxic waste in a dark room. Lenny and Carl come in and invite Homer to go bowling. Homer lies to Marge on the phone, telling her that he was not able to attend a tea party date with Maggie because there was a breakdown at the plant and Lenny was hospitalized. Homer then goes bowling with Lenny and Carl. He bowls a 300 game, and makes the evening news, earning the attention of the entire town. With this accomplishment, Homer becomes a celebrity, appearing on The Springfield Squares. The appearance ends disastrously, with Homer getting into a fight with fellow celebrity guest Ron Howard, leading Kent Brockman to lament inviting a "flavor of the month" like Homer onto the show. Determined to prolong his moment in the limelight, Homer attempts a walk-on during a Penn & Teller special. This also backfires on him as Penn chases him off the stage with a crossbow (and leaves Teller slowly descending into a tub of shark-filled water).

Homer's 15 minutes of fame wanes, and he becomes "yesterday's news" according to an entertainment news show. Worrying that his life has peaked, he attempts to commit suicide by jumping from a tall building, but Otto, who is bungee jumping, saves him. Thankful for being alive, Homer dedicates his life to his children after seeing Howard take his children to a zoo. He tries, but fails to connect with Bart (who already has a father figure in construction workers, the Internet, and Nelson Muntz) and Lisa (who is too intellectual for him), so he decides to spend more time with Maggie. He tries to teach her how to swim, but she does not trust him and will not go in the water. When Homer takes Maggie to the beach, he gets caught in a rip current and nearly drowns. Maggie swims out and pulls him to shore. For saving him, Homer treats Maggie to a game of bowling—and she bowls a perfect game, but Homer penalizes her for supposedly going over the foul line, which results in him winning 296–295; despite Homer's allegation of Maggie stepping over the line, the balloon which afterwards falls from the ceiling acknowledged Maggie's 300 score.

== Production ==
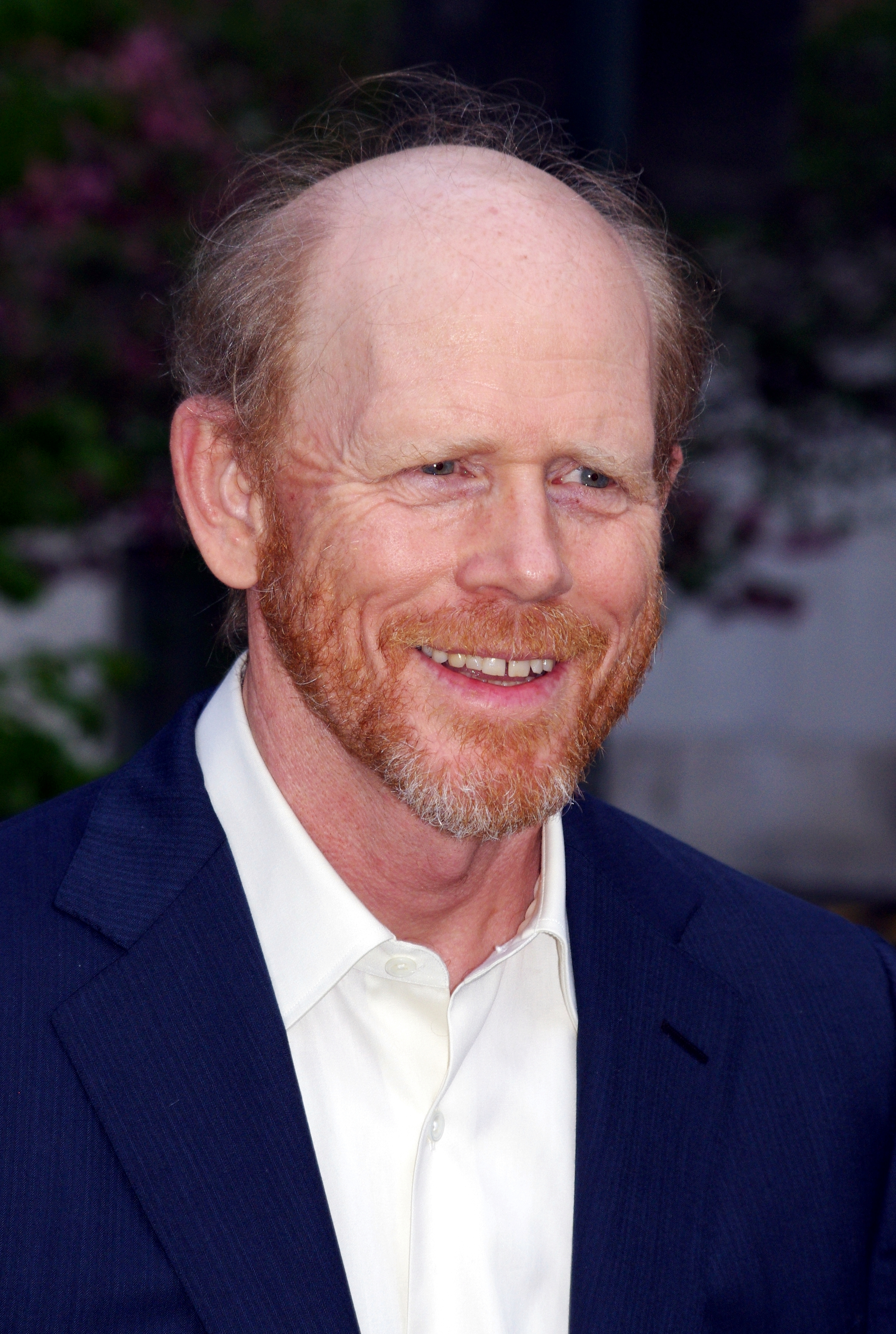
Ron Howard appears in the episode.

The episode was written by Al Jean and directed Mike B. Anderson as part of the eleventh season of The Simpsons (1999–2000). Penn & Teller, Ron Howard, Pat O'Brien, Nancy O'Dell guest starred in the episode as themselves. Howard had previously guest starred on The Simpsons as himself in the season ten episode "When You Dish Upon a Star" (1998). Howard was set to appear in "Children of a Lesser Clod" (2001), but dropped out for unknown reasons.

The author of the 2003 book Ron Howard: From Mayberry to the Moon… and Beyond, Beverly Gray, noted that by playing himself in these episodes, "Howard showed once again that he could laugh at his own public persona. His appearances on The Simpsons also suggest how much he remains an American icon, long after the end of his acting career. It's rare indeed for a director or producer to be as instantly recognizable as most Hollywood stars."

== Cultural references ==
Several references to popular culture are featured in the episode. The title is an allusion to the novelty song "Hello Muddah, Hello Fadduh" by comedian Allan Sherman. The song was previously used in "Marge Be Not Proud". Springfield Squares is a parody of the show Hollywood Squares. The scene in which Homer bowls the strike that wins him the perfect game takes many elements from the Robert Redford film The Natural (1984), including the camera flashes, music and slow-motion.

Homer sings The Doors song "The End" when he walks through the streets considering suicide. Homer plays a Where's Waldo? game on the back of the cereal box he eats his breakfast from. While he is doing this, Waldo walks past the window behind him. After Homer bowls his perfect game, he pulls out a "Before I Die I want To-" list and checks off the item "Bowl a Perfect Game". Below that is listed "See Stevie Nicks Naked", which has been checked three times. Stevie Nicks is a singer and member of the group Fleetwood Mac.

Mrs. Krabappel reads a "Teacher's Edition" of the 1973 novel Fear of Flying. When Homer and Otto descend into the sewers on the bungee rope, they pass three underground societies: the Morlocks (from the 1960 film The Time Machine), the C.H.U.D.s (from the 1984 film C.H.U.D.) and the Mole People (from the 1956 film The Mole People).

When Maggie swims out to save Homer from drowning in the ocean, the main theme from Victory at Sea plays.

== Release ==
"Hello Gutter, Hello Fadder" originally aired on the Fox network in the United States on November 14, 1999. On October 7, 2008, it was released on DVD as part of the box set The Simpsons – The Complete Eleventh Season. Staff members Mike Scully, Al Jean, George Meyer, Ian Maxtone-Graham, Matt Selman, and Mike B. Anderson participated in the DVD audio commentary for the episode. Deleted scenes from the episode were also included on the box set.

While reviewing the eleventh season of The Simpsons, DVD Movie Guide's Colin Jacobson commented that "this episode refers to Maggie as 'the forgotten Simpson', and they ain’t kidding. She rarely gets much attention, and for good reason: she doesn’t bring much to the series. ['Hello Gutter, Hello Fadder'] has some laughs – particularly during a fun bit that spoofs The Natural - but its story feels like it’s all over the place. Maggie episodes are rare – and rarely very good. That holds true for this one as well."

However, in his review of the eleventh season of The Simpsons, Den of Geek critic Mark Oakley wrote that "there are some fine episodes to be found", such as "Hello Gutter, Hello Fadder", which he described as a "highlight".
