= Guess Who's Coming to Criticize Dinner? =

- The Simpsons episode
- Episode no.: Season 11; Episode 3
- Directed by: Nancy Kruse
- Written by: Al Jean
- Production code: AABF21
- Original air date: October 24, 1999

Guest appearance
- Ed Asner as the newspaper editor

Episode features
- Chalkboard gag: "I am not The Last Don"
- Couch gag: The Simpsons sit down as normal. Marge notices the name "Matt Groening" written on the carpet, gets up, and wipes the name off. Groening comes in and rewrites his name on the floor.
- Commentary: Mike Scully; Al Jean; George Meyer; Dan Greaney; Matt Selman; Nancy Kruse

Episode chronology
← Previous "Brother's Little Helper"	Next → "Treehouse of Horror X"
- The Simpsons season 11

"Guess Who's Coming to Criticize Dinner" is the third episode of the eleventh season of the American animated television series The Simpsons. It originally aired on the Fox network in the United States on October 24, 1999. In the episode, Homer becomes a food critic for a Springfield newspaper and ends up annoying the restaurant owners of Springfield after he makes negative reviews just to be mean, advice he took from fellow critics. Springfield's restaurant owners then attempt to kill Homer by feeding him a poisoned éclair. American actor Ed Asner guest starred in the episode as the newspaper editor who hires Homer.

The episode has received generally mixed to positive reviews from television critics since airing.

== Plot ==
Springfield Elementary arranges a field trip to the offices of The Springfield Shopper for the students, with Homer volunteering to drive and chaperone (having skipped work using a crude dummy). While the students are introduced to the newspaper's history and operations, Homer smells cake and follows it to a retirement party for the newspaper's food critic, which he crashes before greedily eating the food. The editor, seeing Homer's love of food, offers him a job as the new food critic. He asks Homer to prepare a 500-word sample review.

Homer struggles with the review, which is exacerbated by his malfunctioning typewriter (having to not use the letter "e"), but Lisa helps him. He praises every restaurant he visits, and the people of Springfield begin to grow fat like him. At the Springfield Shopper office, the editor introduces Homer to other critics, who chide him for being too generous in his reviews. Homer gives into peer pressure and writes a series of bad reviews, criticizing everything. When Lisa stops helping him for being needlessly cruel, Homer attempts to continue reviewing by himself, but the quality of his reviews reverts back to his old poor standard (having used Santa's Little Helper as inspiration for adjectives). Meanwhile, the local restaurateurs hold a secret meeting regarding Homer's negative reviews and ultimately decide to kill him. One of the chefs volunteers to do the deed by feeding him a poisonous éclair at an upcoming food festival.

While Homer goes about his reviewing duties, Bart overhears some of the restaurateurs discussing the murder plot, and he, Marge and Lisa attempt to warn Homer. Although Homer initially ignores Lisa's warning about the murder plot, he eventually throws away the lethal pastry in revulsion when she exclaims that the éclair is "low fat"; it lands in Hans Moleman's gruel pot and explodes. The police rush to the scene and arrest the chef, who easily manages to escape while they were distracted. As Homer and Lisa leave, he is relieved over an apparent lack of comeuppance, but the angry restaurateurs along with the other critics and townsfolk aggrieved with Homer follow them and beat Homer up.

== Production ==
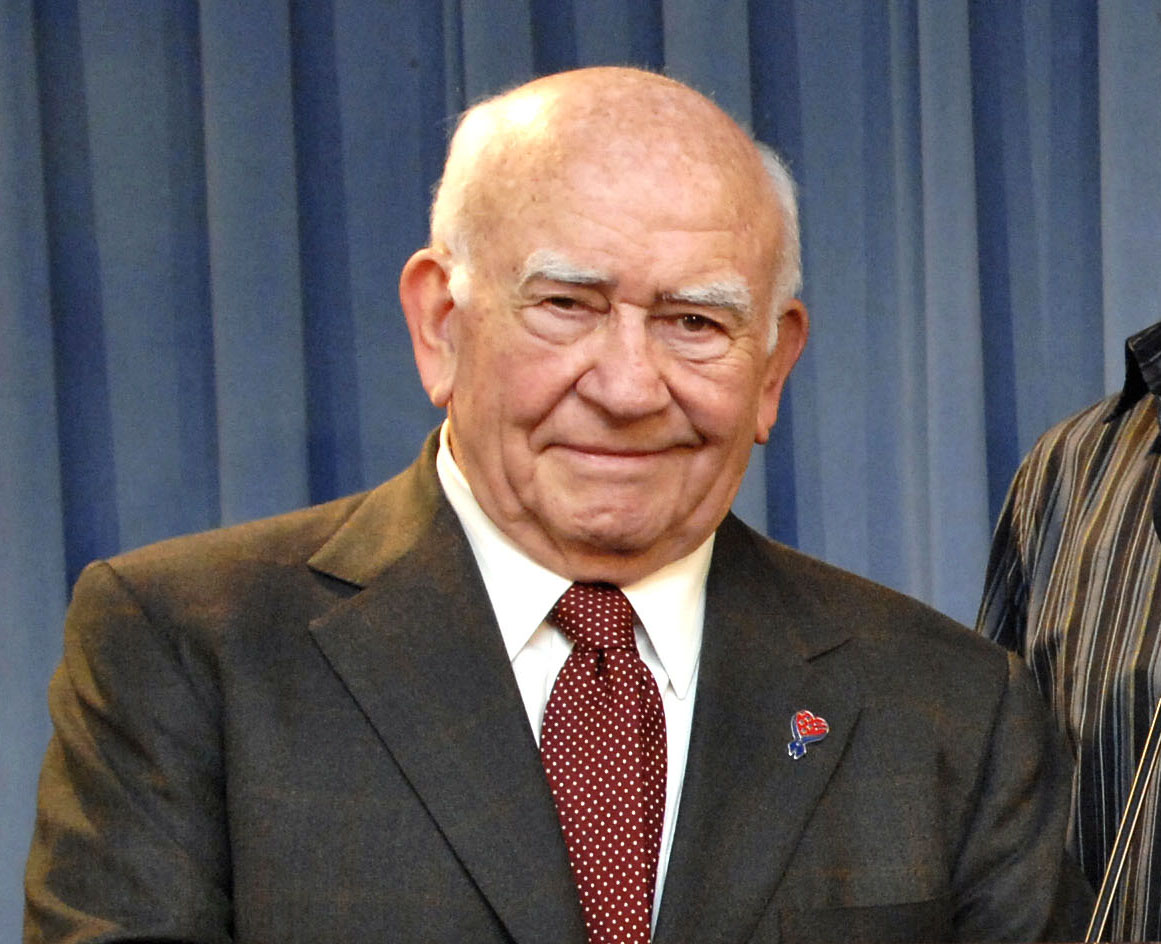
Actor Ed Asner appears in the episode as a character based on Lou Grant. This character was created by longtime Simpsons co-producer James L. Brooks

"Guess Who's Coming to Criticize Dinner" was written by Al Jean and directed by Nancy Kruse as part of the eleventh season of The Simpsons (1999–2000). American actor Ed Asner guest starred in the episode as the newspaper editor that hires Homer. The character is based on Lou Grant, the character Asner played in the series The Mary Tyler Moore Show and Lou Grant. Both shows were created by Simpsons co-producer James L. Brooks. The song Homer sings upon being given the food critic job is set to the tune of "I Feel Pretty" from the musical West Side Story. The restaurant Planet Springfield is a parody of Planet Hollywood, containing items such as the film script for The Cable Guy (1996), Herbie from The Love Bug (1968), a model of the RMS Titanic from Titanic (1997), an alien similar to those from Mars Attacks! (1996), models of a TIE fighter, an X-wing fighter and C-3PO from the Star Wars saga, as well as "the coffee mug" from the film Heartbeeps (1981) and "the cane" from Citizen Kane (1941), which is not a real prop.

The episode's title is a play on the movie "Guess Who's Coming to Dinner". The episode was originally going to be called "The Great Chefs Of Springfield Are Killing Homer", a play on "Who Is Killing the Great Chiefs of Europe?", however it was pointed out that this spoiled the episode's plot for the viewer. The episode contains a scene where Homer swears at an ambulance, his swears being intentionally bleeped out. Dan Castellaneta's reading of the lines apparently contained "fuck you" and "goddamn". A common note that was often received from Fox Network was that a character who has done something wrong has to "receive their comeuppance", so the episode was written specifically to subvert this, with Homer "addressing the camera" to acknowledge his lack of comeuppance.

== Reception ==
"Guess Who's Coming to Criticize Dinner" originally aired on the Fox network in the United States on October 24, 1999. On October 7, 2008, the episode was released on DVD as part of the box set The Simpsons – The Complete Eleventh Season. Staff members Mike Scully, Al Jean, George Meyer, Dan Greaney, Matt Selman and Nancy Kruse participated in the DVD audio commentary for the episode. Deleted scenes from the episode were also included on the box set.

Since airing, the episode has received generally mixed reviews from critics.

In 2003, Ryan Lane of The Daily Orange listed it as the ninth best episode of the series, noting that the "most recent episode on the list is also perhaps the show's last classic."

Nancy Basile of About.com listed the episode as one of the episodes she felt "shined in season eleven".

In 2011, Keith Plocek of LA Weekly's Squid Ink blog named "Guess Who's Coming to Criticize Dinner" the sixth best episode of the show with a food theme.

While reviewing the eleventh season of The Simpsons, DVD Movie Guide's Colin Jacobson however commented that "after the solid ['Brother's Little Helper'], Season 11 dips with the more mediocre ['Guess Who's Coming to Criticize Dinner']. Oh, the show has its moments, especially when Homer’s criticism becomes more mean-spirited. Still, the program rarely becomes anything more than okay; it’s certainly enjoyable but that’s about it."

Karma Waltonen and Denise Du Vernay analyzed "Guess Who's Coming to Criticize Dinner" in their book The Simpsons in the Classroom, in which they demonstrate how episodes of the series can be used in teaching. They wrote: "Although the show's characters do not often model expository writing, we can still find ways to use The Simpsons to illustrate the importance of style. Young writers, for example, may find that their writing resembles Homer's when he attempts to write restaurant reviews in 'Guess Who's Coming to Criticize Dinner.' Homer's diction is poor, his piece rambles off, and he attempts to make the word count by repeating 'Screw Flanders' several times. We can thus illustrate that students need to reduce wordiness [...], while developing their arguments through pertinent content or parallelism. We can also stress revision by showing what Lisa is able to do when she helps her father brainstorm. For example, when they need two more words to end the review, Lisa replaces 'Screw Flanders' with 'Bon appétit'."
