= Julie Thacker =

American television writer

Julie Thacker Scully (born January 1960) is an American television writer. She has written for The Simpsons, and along with her husband, The Simpsons writer and producer Mike Scully, she has co-created The Pitts and Complete Savages and is the co-creator of Duncanville.

== Writing credits ==
=== The Simpsons episodes ===
She has written these episodes:

- "The Old Man and the 'C' Student" (1999)
- "Last Tap Dance in Springfield" (2000)
- "I'm Goin' to Praiseland" (2001)

=== Duncanville episodes ===
She has written the following episodes:

- "Pilot" (2020)
- "Red Head Redemption" (2020)
- "Sister, Wife" (2020)
- "Jack's Pipe Dream" (2020)
- "Judge Annie" (2020)
- "Free Range Children" (2020)
- "Das Banana Boot" (2021)
- "Duncan's New Word" (2021)
- "Who's Vrooming Who?" (2021)
- "Annie Oakie" (2021)
- "Witch Day 3" (2022)
