= Saddlesore Galactica =

- The Simpsons episode
- Homer collects a trophy after "Furious D" wins the Springfield Derby.
- Episode no.: Season 11; Episode 13
- Directed by: Lance Kramer
- Written by: Tim Long
- Production code: BABF09
- Original air date: February 6, 2000

Guest appearances
- Randy Bachman as himself; Trevor Denman as himself; C.F. Turner as himself; Jim Cummings as Duncan

Episode features
- Chalkboard gag: "Substitute teachers are not scabs"
- Couch gag: The Simpsons are karate students and chop up the couch. Homer does a karate flip as he turns the television on with the remote control.
- Commentary: Tim Long; Lance Kramer; Mike Scully; Matt Groening; George Meyer; Ian Maxtone-Graham; Matt Selman; Tom Martin

Episode chronology
← Previous "The Mansion Family"	Next → "Alone Again, Natura-Diddily"
- The Simpsons season 11

"Saddlesore Galactica" is the thirteenth episode of the eleventh season of the American animated television series The Simpsons. It originally aired on the Fox network in the United States on February 6, 2000. In the episode, the Simpson family rescues a diving horse named Duncan from an abusive owner and keeps him as a pet. When the cost of keeping Duncan rises, Homer and Bart train him to be a racehorse. Duncan wins several races and, as a result, Homer is threatened with death by a group of jockeys. Meanwhile, Lisa is upset over her school unfairly losing the musical band competition at a state fair and writes a letter to U.S. President Bill Clinton in protest.

The episode features several guest appearances; horse race caller Trevor Denman stars as himself, commentating the races in the episode, and voice artist Jim Cummings provides the animal sounds made by Duncan. Randy Bachman and Fred Turner appear as themselves as their rock band Bachman–Turner Overdrive performs at the state fair. "Saddlesore Galactica" was written by Tim Long and directed by Lance Kramer. A number of meta-references are included in the episode, such as the character Comic Book Guy telling the Simpsons that they have owned a horse before in the episode "Lisa's Pony".

Around 9.6 million American homes tuned in to watch the episode during its original airing. In 2008, it was released on DVD, along with the rest of the episodes of the eleventh season. The episode received negative reviews from critics and is widely considered to be one of the series' worst episodes. Criticism was directed toward the episode's plot and third act, which has being frequently touted as an example of jumping the shark.

== Plot ==
Lisa and the other members of Springfield Elementary's school band enter a music competition together at a state fair, performing James Brown's "Living in America". However, they lose to the Ogdenville Elementary band, which performs John Philip Sousa's "Stars and Stripes Forever" and uses red, white, and blue glow sticks to form a flag. Lisa accuses Ogdenville of cheating, as the use of visual aids is against the rules of the competition. She later writes a letter to President Clinton (Karl Wiedergott), complaining about the situation. At the fair, Homer and Bart see a horse named Duncan that can dive into pools. The Simpsons takes Duncan home after his sleazy owner is accused of animal cruelty and flees. However, they find themselves spending $500 a week for Duncan's upkeep.

Homer and Bart try to think of a way that Duncan can make money to help offset the costs of keeping him. Bart discovers that Duncan is a fast runner and suggests that he should be a racehorse. Homer enters Duncan at the Springfield Downs racetrack, with Bart as the jockey. However, a frightened Duncan loses his first race as he refuses to leave the stall until all other horses have finished. Homer and Bart find a strategy for Duncan to win by turning him into a frightening horse named "Furious D", complete with dyed hair and (during his first appearance) one of Lisa's bracelets for a nose ring. He intimidates the other horses and wins several races. Homer is soon invited by the losing jockeys to have a beer in their lounge, which turns out to be the entrance to a secret underground land. The jockeys reveal themselves to be crazy, arrogant elf-like creatures and threaten to eat Homer's brain unless Duncan loses the upcoming Springfield Derby. Though frightened at first, Homer changes his mind due to his loyalty to his son and his horse as well as his own pride, vowing to deal with "those murderous trolls".

Duncan wins the Derby, sending the jockeys into a rage, and they begin chasing after Homer and Bart with swords. However, Marge and Lisa spray the jockeys with water to subdue them, and Homer stuffs them all into a garbage bag and leaves them at the curb to be hauled away with the garbage. Homer and Bart prepare to retire Duncan from racing, so he can become a stud. President Clinton then shows up at the Simpsons' house and presents Lisa with a plaque, overruling the state fair judges and declaring Springfield Elementary the winner of the music competition. The credits play as normal, and during the Gracie Films logo, Comic Book Guy says, "Worst, episode, ever."

== Production ==
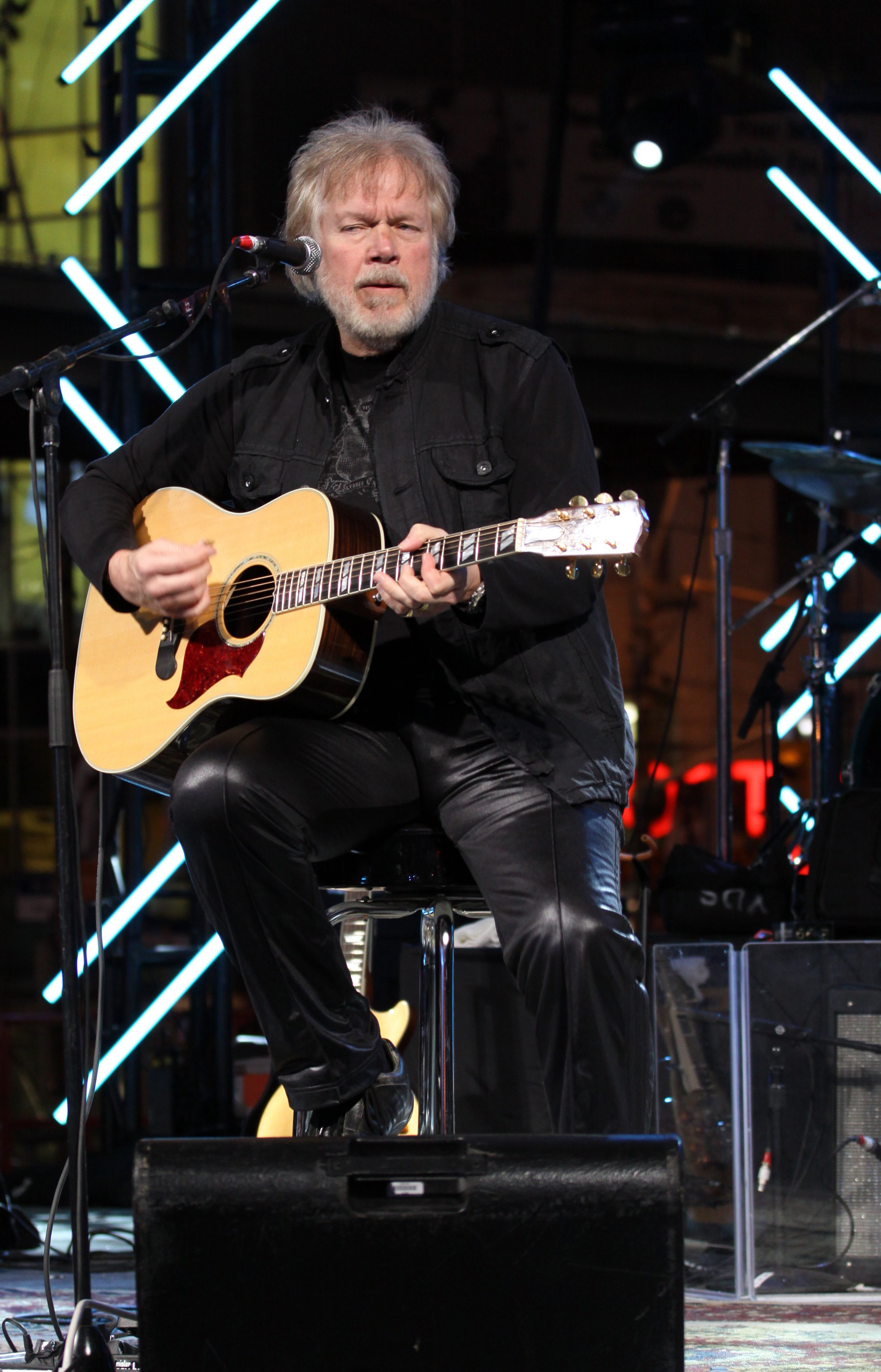
Randy Bachman guest starred in the episode as himself, appearing as part of Bachman–Turner Overdrive despite having left the band at that time.

"Saddlesore Galactica" was written by Tim Long and directed by Lance Kramer as part of the eleventh season of The Simpsons (1999–2000). The title is a reference to the science fiction television series Battlestar Galactica. The idea of Duncan originally being a diving horse was inspired by an actual diving horse that used to jump into a pool at Steel Pier in Atlantic City, New Jersey at the beginning of the 20th century; a postcard showing this horse was used as a reference by the animators for the scenes featuring the diving. When the animation process began, Kramer drew instructions to his animators on how horses move when they run and how their ankles work. He has said that because Duncan was a large part of the story, "we wanted him to have somewhat of a personality. So when everybody knew how to draw the horse and we got that out of the way, they could animate the horse acting." Voice artist Jim Cummings provided the animal sounds made by Duncan in the episode.

American horse race caller Trevor Denman guest starred in the episode as himself, commentating on Duncan's races over the public-address system. Randy Bachman and Fred Turner, known for their rock band Bachman–Turner Overdrive, made an appearance in the episode as themselves. They perform on stage at the state fair during the beginning of the episode. When Bachman and Turner tell the audience that they are going to play some songs from their new album, Homer immediately yells out demands for them to play their old song "Takin' Care of Business". The band starts the song and Homer then yells, "Get to the 'workin overtime' part!" The band obliges, skipping straight to the chorus. Bachman had left the band when "Saddlesore Galactica" was recorded and because of tension between him and Turner, the two recorded their lines separately on different occasions. Long has said that the Simpsons staff members "were thrilled to have [them] on the show" and that the pair "could not have been nicer."

== Meta-references ==
The episode is heavily self-referential and contains a number of meta-references. When the Simpsons take Duncan home from the fair, Comic Book Guy points out to the Simpsons that they have already taken in a horse as a pet (as seen in "Lisa's Pony"), and that "the expense forced Homer to work at the Kwik-E-Mart, with hilarious consequences." In another scene later in the episode, when Lisa points out to Marge that Marge is showing signs of gambling problems, Comic Book Guy shows up again wearing a T-shirt that says "Worst Episode Ever" and tells Lisa: "Hey, I'm watching you!" This refers to the fact that Marge's gambling problems have already been explored in the episode "$pringfield (or, How I Learned to Stop Worrying and Love Legalized Gambling)".

Jonathan Gray analyzed the self-referentiality in The Simpsons in his 2006 book Watching with The Simpsons: Television, Parody, and Intertextuality, writing that "Sitcoms constantly 'reset' themselves, living in [...] an 'existential circle' in which nothing really changes, and every episode starts more or less where the last one started; and The Simpsons frequently plays with this sitcom clock, and with the amnesia of sitcom memory. The family members often forget important events in their 'history' [...]". Gray noted that in "Saddlesore Galactica", "the action continues as normal, as sitcom memory (or lack thereof) is pointed out but comically not acted upon. Thus, where David Grote [author of The End of Comedy: The Sit-Com and the Comedic Tradition] (1983: 67) notes that sitcom episodes 'live in a kind of time-warp without any reference to the other episodes,' producing a situation whereby everything 'remains inviolate and undisturbed, no matter what transitory events may occur' (1983: 59), The Simpsons comically reflects upon this."

== Cultural references ==
The episode's title is a reference to Battlestar Galactica. The subjects of horse diving and equine place-kicking were both tackled in the Disney films Wild Hearts Can't Be Broken and Gus, respectively. The jockeys' underground lair borrows many elements from Munchkinland in The Wizard Of Oz and the Oompa Loompas in Willy Wonka and the Chocolate Factory. At the fair, Bachman–Turner Overdrive perform perform parts of their songs Takin' Care of Business and You Ain't Seen Nothing Yet. The Springfield Elementary Band performs James Brown's Living In America.

== Reception ==
The episode originally aired on the Fox network in the United States on February 6, 2000. It was viewed in approximately 9.6 million households that night. With a Nielsen rating of 9.5, "Saddlesore Galactica" finished 29th in the ratings for the week of January 31–February 6, 2000. It was the second highest-rated broadcast on Fox that week, following an episode of Malcolm in the Middle. On October 7, 2008, "Saddlesore Galactica" was released on DVD as part of the box set The Simpsons – The Complete Eleventh Season. Staff members Tim Long, Lance Kramer, Mike Scully, Matt Groening, George Meyer, Ian Maxtone-Graham, Matt Selman, and Tom Martin participated in the DVD audio commentary for the episode. Deleted scenes from the episode were also included on the box set.

According to Long, "Saddlesore Galactica" is considered by many critics and fans as one of the worst episodes in the history of the show, particularly for the scenes featuring the jockey elves. In 2007, Maclean's writer Marco Ursi named it his least favorite episode of The Simpsons, elaborating: "This is the one where the Simpsons get a horse – again – and the plot devolves into something involving the secret land of the jockeys. Making meta-references to the fact you’ve just made your 'worst episode ever' doesn’t make it any funnier." Nancy Basile of About.com listed the episode as one of the worst episodes of the season—one of the episodes that made her "cringe because they included blatant gimmicks and outlandish plots".

Despite its criticisms, "Saddlesore Galactica" received some positive retrospective reviews. While reviewing the eleventh season of The Simpsons, DVD Movie Guide's Colin Jacobson commented on the episode, writing: "I remember that 'Saddlesore' was much despised when it first aired, though I can’t recall if I joined that chorus as well. Maybe the many iffy episodes since early 2000 have made it look better, but I think that 'Saddlesore' offers a decent number of laughs. It goes off onto some dopey tangents and displays an unnerving tendency toward self-awareness, but it provides reasonable entertainment." DVD Talk's Ian Jane described the cameo appearance by Bachman and Turner as "fun".

Collider ranked the episode 6th on its list of the "Worst Simpsons Episodes" in 2025. The episode was included on Kotaku's list of "the 10 Worst Simpsons Episodes Ever".
