= William Frank Carver =

American entertainer

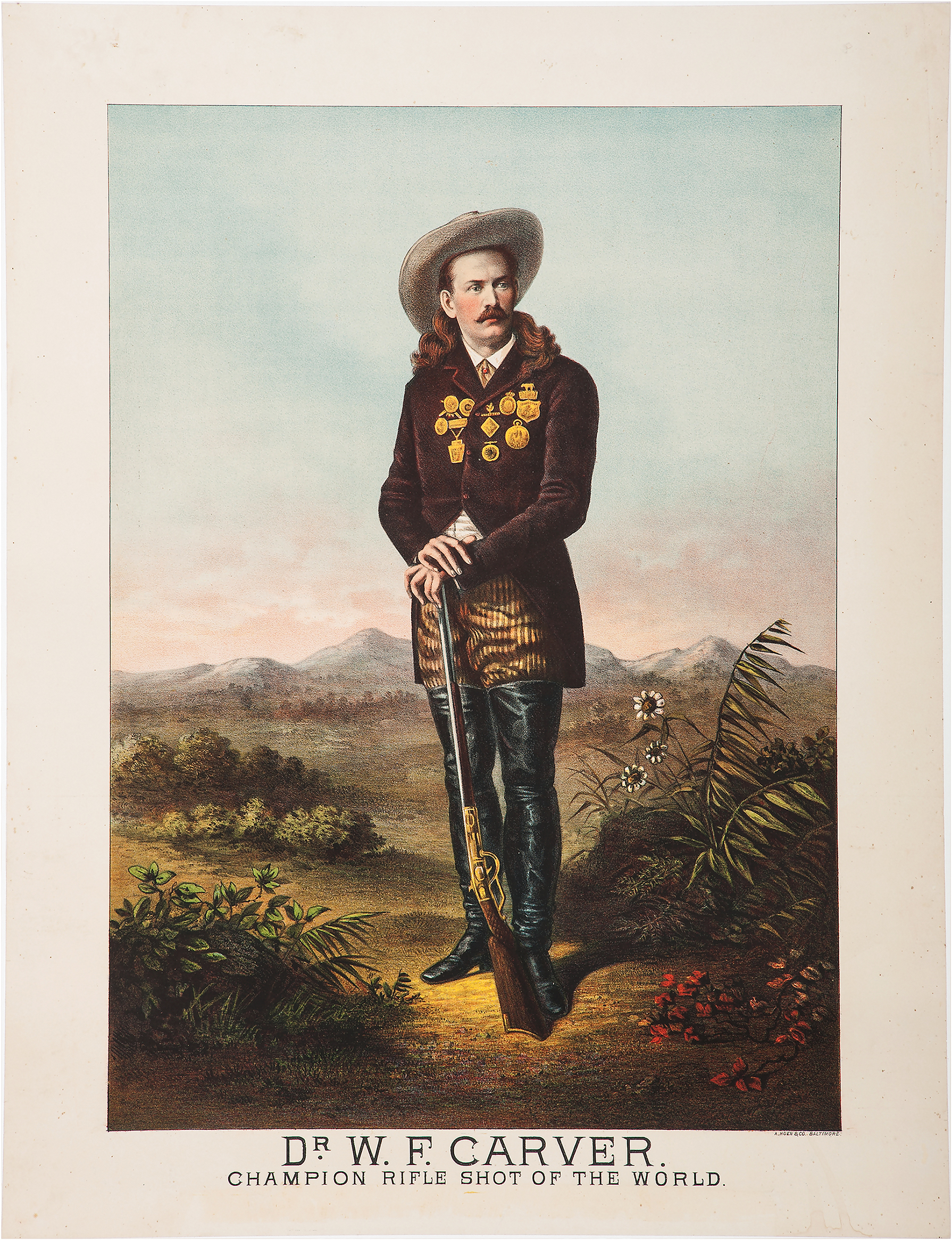

William Frank "Doc" Carver (May 7, 1840* – August 31, 1927) was a late 19th-century sharpshooter and the creator of a popular diving horse attraction.

== Early life ==
William Frank Carver was born in Winslow, Illinois, to William Daniel Carver (1828–1888), a physician, and Deborah Tohapenes (Peters) Carver (1829–1907), who had migrated to Illinois from Pennsylvania in 1849. He had a younger brother, William Pitt, who became a farmer in Kansas, and a sister, May, who was born in May 1856 and died before the age of two.

There seems to be no creditable information about Carver's childhood, as the contradictions in stories he told classify them as entertainment rather than fact. *For most of his adult life Carver gave the year of his birth as 1840, but it is likely he did so in order to enlarge the time frame needed to create stories of frontier experience for his admiring audiences after he became a showman. Had he been born in 1840, his father and mother would have been twelve and eleven years old. The 1860 United States Census shows his age as 9 years old at the time, so he was likely born in 1850. Carver's biographer, Raymond Thorp, wrote that Carver left home at a young age to assert his family's right to land in Minnesota that the Sioux had supposedly granted his grandfather, Jonathan Carver, and that during this period of time he lived with the Santee Sioux. This contention, however, like other claims made by Carver about his early life and never investigated by his biographer, does not withstand the scrutiny of reputable historians.

== A plainsman ==
Carver was trained as a dentist and hence acquired the nickname "Doc". He migrated to the West in 1872, where he practiced dentistry at Fort McPherson, Nebraska, and North Platte, Nebraska. He later attempted to distance himself from his early profession as a dentist, but the name "Doc" clung for life. At Fort McPherson he met Buffalo Bill Cody, Texas Jack Omohundro, and other well-known figures of the day. In November 1872 he moved to the newly organized Frontier County, Nebraska, in the company of Ena Raymonde, a southern belle from Georgia, whose brother W. H. "Paddy" Miles had recently established a trapper's camp known as Wolf's Rest on Medicine Creek. Carver took a claim near Wolf's Rest, and it was here that he began to acquire the target shooting, horseback riding, and hunting skills that would lead to his later success as a world-class marksman. Raymonde, a recognized markswoman, who had been challenged to shoot by Buffalo Bill Cody and Texas Jack Omohundro, is credited with playing a part in teaching Carver to shoot. An entry from Raymonde's 1872 journal reveals insights into Carver as a young man and also portrays the prevailing enthusiasm for shooting sports in the 19th century: "Sunday afternoon we all … went to see a prairie-dog town! We went at half-speed or better all the way. Shot about 200 rounds; the Dr. doing the most of the business of shooting if not killing ..."

Although Carver's time as a plainsman was short, he was on the western Nebraska frontier during an exciting era. Conflict between whites and Native Americans in the immediate area was decreasing but not eliminated. A remnant band of Lakota Sioux known as the Cut-off Sioux was encamped on Medicine Creek several miles to the east of Carver's cabin, and although his claim of having killed the Cut-offs' old war chief Whistler and two of his braves in late 1872 does not conform to the evidence, Carver was certainly in the area during a time of potential and sometimes real hostilities between whites and Native Americans.

It was a common practice during the late 19th century for well-heeled men, from the East and from abroad, to travel to the West to engage in hunting expeditions, and Carver undoubtedly had the opportunity to participate in several of these hunts. Buffalo Bill Cody wrote in his 1879 autobiography that Carver, who, in Cody's words, "has recently acquired considerable notoriety as a rifle-shot," had joined a hunt at which Cody had been engaged as a guide by the Englishman Thomas P. Medley. Late in 1874 Carver spent two weeks practicing dentistry at Fort Sidney, after which he moved to Cheyenne, Wyoming, where he continued working as a dentist.

== Shooting career ==
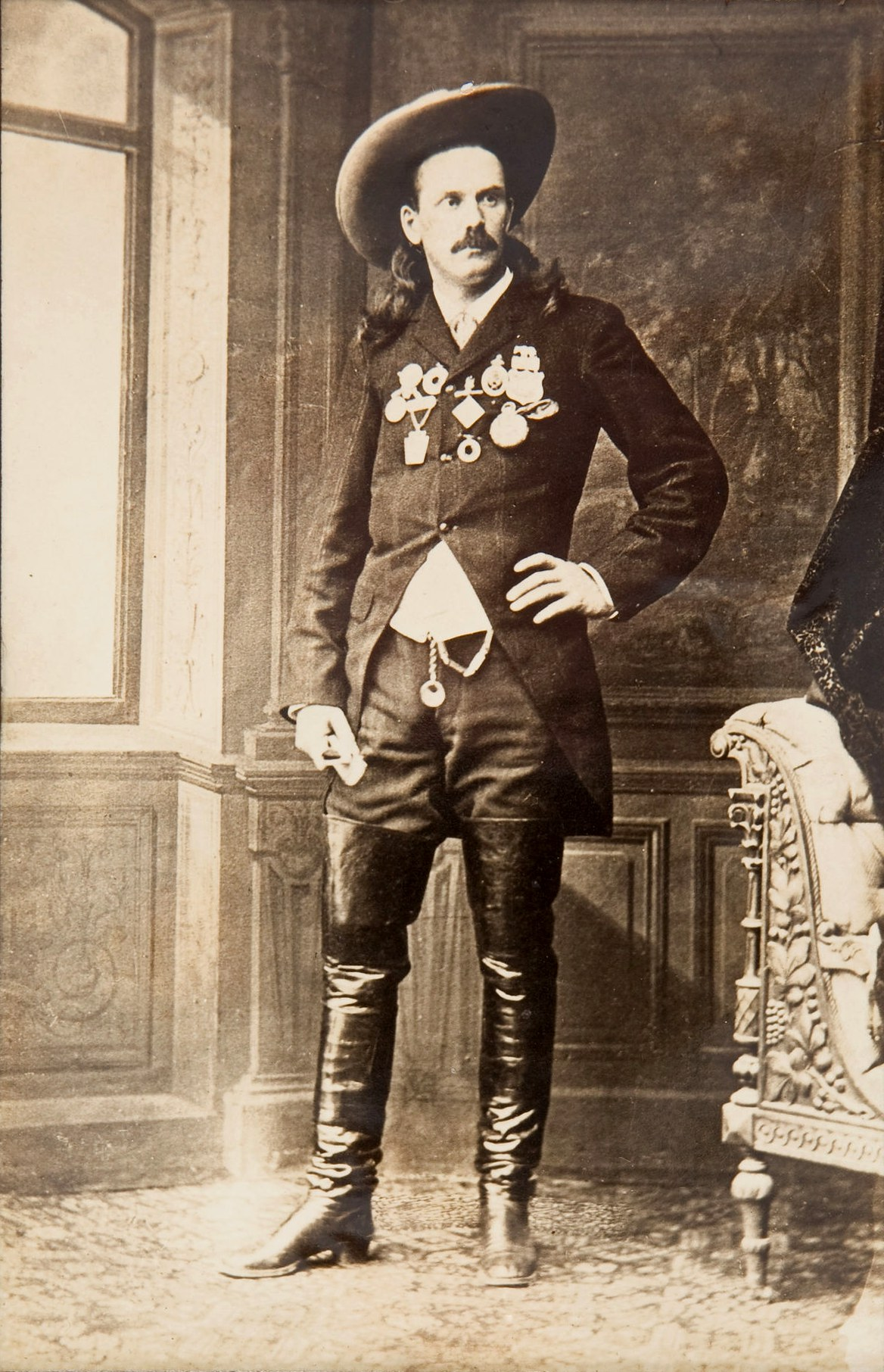
Carver in 1883, displaying the medals he earned as a sharpshooter

Carver migrated to California in 1876, where he honed his shooting skills. At about this time he coined the moniker "Evil Spirit", accompanied by a "camp-fire tale" that the name had been given to him by Spotted Tail, the famous chief of the Brulé Lakota, because Carver had felled a rare white buffalo. In December 1877 the Evil Spirit issued a challenge to all comers; he would use a rifle and the challenger could use a shotgun, and the targets would be glass balls thrown from the newly invented Bogardus glass ball trap. He also contended that he could hit more targets from horseback than a challenger could hit while standing on the ground. One of the first significant awards Carver won was for breaking 885 glass balls out of 1000 in San Francisco on February 22, 1878. The gold badge was capped with the image of a grizzly bear and bore an inscription that proclaimed Dr. W. F. Carver the "Champion Rifle Shot of the World". Following his success in California, Carver recruited Texas Jack Omohundro, and the pair went on tour giving exhibitions of shooting prowess, with Carver demonstrating his expertise with the rifle while Omohundro displayed his proficiency with the pistol. These demonstrations included endurance contests as well as target competitions. An article in The New York Times on July 6, 1878, illustrates the reception Carver received:

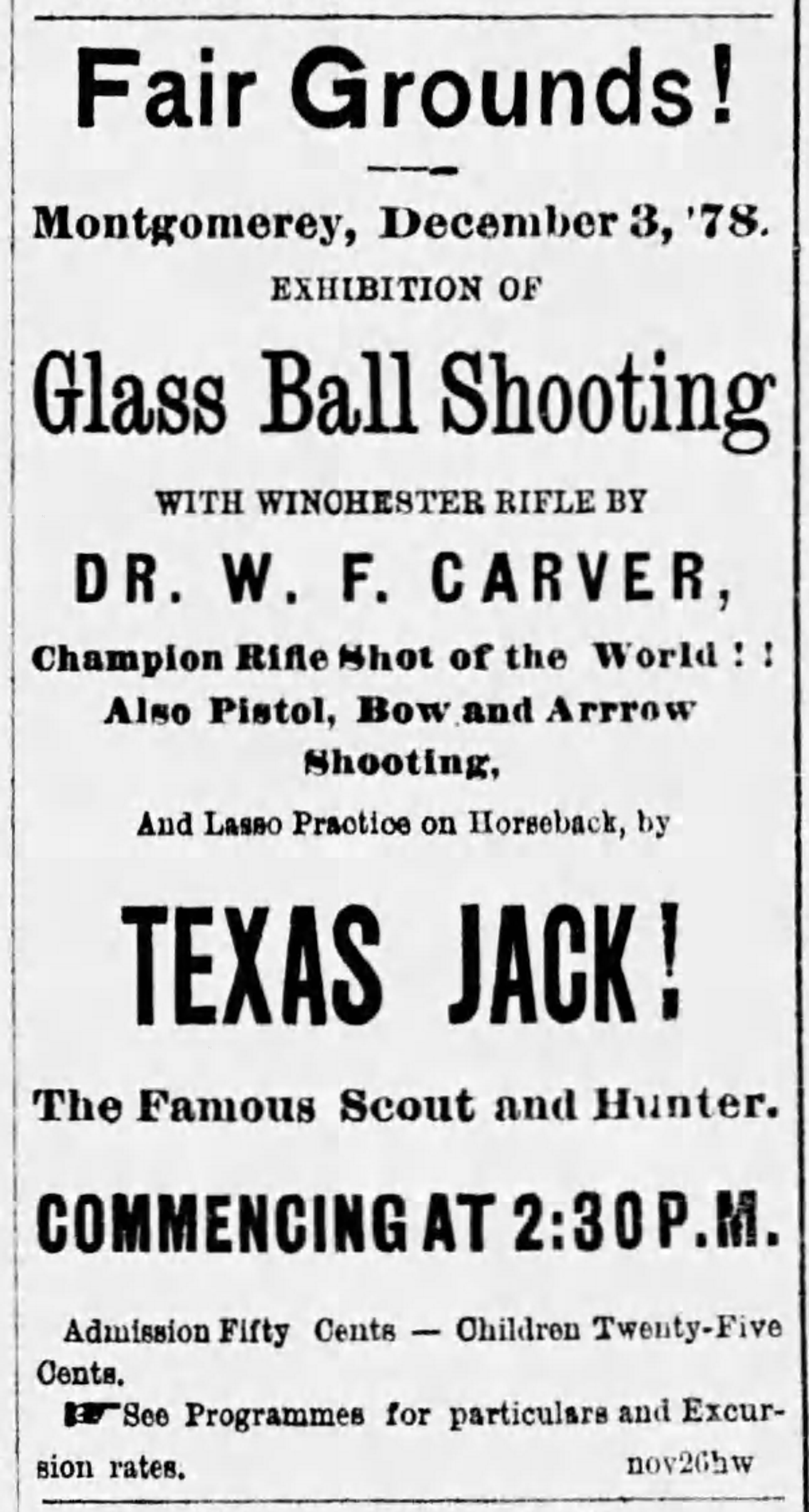
An advertisement for a shooting exhibition by Doc Carver and Texas Jack Omohundro

Dr. W. F. Carver, the man who can put a bullet through a silver quarter while the coin is flying through the air, is an enlarged and revised edition of Buffalo Bill and Texas Jack. Being fresh from the broad plains of the untrammeled West, he has that delightful air of unconventionality to be found only in the land of the setting sun ...

Dr. Carver is, no doubt, the best short-range marksman in the world. He gave his second exhibition at Deerfoot Park yesterday, and astonished everybody who saw him. He is as fine a specimen of fully developed manhood as ever walked on Manhattan Island. More than six feet high, every part of his body is built to correspond. His chest is so deep that it would take a powerful rifle to send a bullet through it. His shoulders are broad and high, and, altogether, he is exactly the man that ordinary people wouldn't put themselves out of the way to pick a quarrel with ...

The scene of yesterday's shooting is worthy of description. A ... table, on which were four rifles, several boxes of cartridges, and half a dozen score-books. Fifteen or 20 feet in front of this, again, a barrel and a man, the man taking the glass balls out of the barrel and throwing them in the air, and Dr. Carver breaking them with the bullets as fast as they appeared. Somebody was always at work loading a rifle. The marksman could fire them faster than the loaders could load. And they were the most remarkable rifles – breach-loaders, of course. When they were opened at the end one cartridge was shoved in after another, till it seemed as if the first one must surely be somewhere up by the muzzle ...

He seldom misses what he fires at. Most of the time was taken up in shooting glass balls, filled with feathers. The balls were of the thinnest film of glass, slightly tinted, so as to be seen easily in the air, and when they broke, the feathers scattered in every direction...

Carver also joined the ranks of western figures that embellished their frontier credentials by writing books. In 1878 he published a book, Life of Dr. Wm. F. Carver of California: Champion Rifle Shot of the World, which contains entirely fictional versions of his early life but also includes extracts from the press coverage of his first shooting tour across the country.

On August 20, 1878, while in New Haven, Connecticut, Carver married Josephine Dailey, whom he had met on a previous trip. Little is known about the marriage, as Carver's biographer mentions Josephine only in several brief references describing the first few years following the marriage. It appears she was a marginal presence in Carver's life throughout his early years as a showman, and apparently they later separated. It is known that the Carvers had two children, Al and Lorena, both of whom were eventually involved in their father's diving horse act.

== Carver versus Bogardus ==
Almost from the beginning of his shooting career, Carver issued challenges to Captain Adam Henry Bogardus, who was recognized across the country and around the world as the champion trap shooter. Bogardus was Carver's senior by seventeen years, however, and had little to gain and much to lose by accepting a challenge from the newcomer.

In 1879 Carver set sail for a tour of Europe, where he shot in numerous exhibitions and matches, using shotgun, rifle, and pistol and shooting from horseback or from foot. He performed for ordinary citizens and for nobility, the most notable being the Prince of Wales (later Edward VII). He traveled to France, Belgium, Germany, and Austria, but most of the tour was in the British Isles, where he was booked for a long-term engagement at the Crystal Palace, in the wealthy Sydenham Hill district of London.

Regardless of the considerable success he was having in Europe, the desire to stage a match with the great Bogardus was ever-present. So anxious was Carver to shoot against Bogardus that in 1881, in a challenge printed in the London Sportsman, he offered to pay $250 toward expenses if Bogardus would travel to London for a match. Bogardus ignored this challenge. Carver returned to the United States in the fall of 1882 and again threw down the gauntlet. Early in 1883 Bogardus finally agreed to a live pigeon shoot in Louisville, Kentucky. The proposed match created much excitement in the shooting world, and a crowd of nearly 1000 gathered to watch two of the world's finest shooters compete. The Louisville Commercial ran the following article on February 21, 1883:

Captain A. H. Bogardus, the champion shot, arrived in the city yesterday morning, and immediately repaired to the Louisville Hotel, where his rival, Dr. Carver is stopping. Neither of them "recognized" the other, although they met several times during the morning and dined at adjoining tables. Captain Bogardus remarked to a friend in a fatherly way that the "young 'un" seemed to be in fine form, and Dr. Carver was overheard saying as he blushed before a plate of potato salad, that "the old man was looking pretty well himself." Once or twice they glared politely at each other, and the scene was rather amusing. Captain Bogardus would transfix a baked apple with his fork, and then cast a quick glance at Carver, who at that moment was sipping his ox-tail soup, timidly eyeing the Captain over the rim of the bowl.

Carver won the match 83 to 82, giving Bogardus the nudge needed to issue a challenge for further matches. In Chicago, Illinois, they shot two matches, one at live birds and one at clay pigeons, Carver winning both matches. From there they traveled to St. Louis, Missouri, where they found a message waiting for them from the Ligowsky Clay Pigeon Company. If they used Ligowsky's clay pigeons, the company would award a $7500 purse for the series of 25 matches. The match using clay pigeons that they had already shot in Chicago was counted as one match, another match was shot while they were in St. Louis, and from there they traveled to 23 more cities. Carver won 19 of the 25 matches and secured his position as one of the world's best marksmen.

== Wild West show ==
About this same time, Carver went into partnership with Buffalo Bill Cody to put a Wild West show on the road. The grand opening of the "Wild West: Hon. W. F. Cody and Dr. W. F. Carver's Rocky Mountain and Prairie Exhibition" was in Omaha, Nebraska, on May 17, 1883. Their series of shooting matches completed, both Carver and Bogardus joined the show in Omaha. The show was an immediate success, but the relationship between the two showmen, Carver and Cody, was contentious from the beginning. At the end of the season they parted ways and divided the assets by the flip of a coin. Cody then formed a partnership with the promoter and showman Nate Salsbury, and the show continued as Buffalo Bill's Wild West.

Carver put his own show on tour, also billed as the Wild West. As the two shows crisscrossed the country for the next few years, Carver and Cody engaged in legal wrangling over various issues. The foremost points of dispute were the use of the name Wild West and Carver's assertion that Cody still owed him $27,000, which Carver claimed he had invested in the original show. In July 1885 both shows were in Connecticut, and The New York Times reported that "An interminable row has broken out in this State between Dr. Carver, the marksman, and Buffalo Bill. They have been running rival shows under the same title of 'Wild West'." A trial, intended to end the suits and countersuits, was set for July 20, 1885. Cody failed to appear, however, so Carver agreed to dismiss his suit for $10,000 cash and Salsbury's offer to pay the court costs. Carver and Cody, once friends, remained bitter enemies for the rest of their lives.

His show broken up, Carver did not have the financial resources to reorganize. For the next few years he appeared as a featured act in several outdoor shows. By 1889 he had secured financial partners and organized his own show, Wild America. Carver launched a worldwide tour, covering much of the same circuit as Cody, but the two shows avoided each other until August 1890, when Carver's show arrived in Hamburg, Germany, ahead of Cody's. Carver's claim to exclusive use of the available electric lights left Cody's show in the dark and added further hostility to the fierce competition between the two showmen. In December 1890 Carver shipped the Wild America troupe to Australia, where it was received with enthusiasm.

In conjunction with the outdoor exhibition, Carver had added a dramatic play, and on his return to the United States in early 1892 launched a tour of both productions across the country. An economic depression, however, had spread across the country by the early 1890s. In addition, a number of similar shows were touring the country, and they were no longer an entertainment novelty. For these and other reasons, Carver's show disbanded sometime in 1893. Carver had continued to give shooting exhibitions and to challenge competitors while on tour in the United States and abroad. After seventeen years as the "Champion Shot of the World" Carver gave one of his last public exhibitions in Lincoln, Nebraska, in 1896. Noting that Carver refused to tell his age but looked fifteen years younger than his stated age, the State Journal reported that "Dr. W. F. Carver, the champion shot of the world, has been giving exhibitions of his wonderful skill in rifle, shotgun and horseback shooting this week at Lincoln park that mystified, surprised and astonished the audience present."

== Diving horses ==
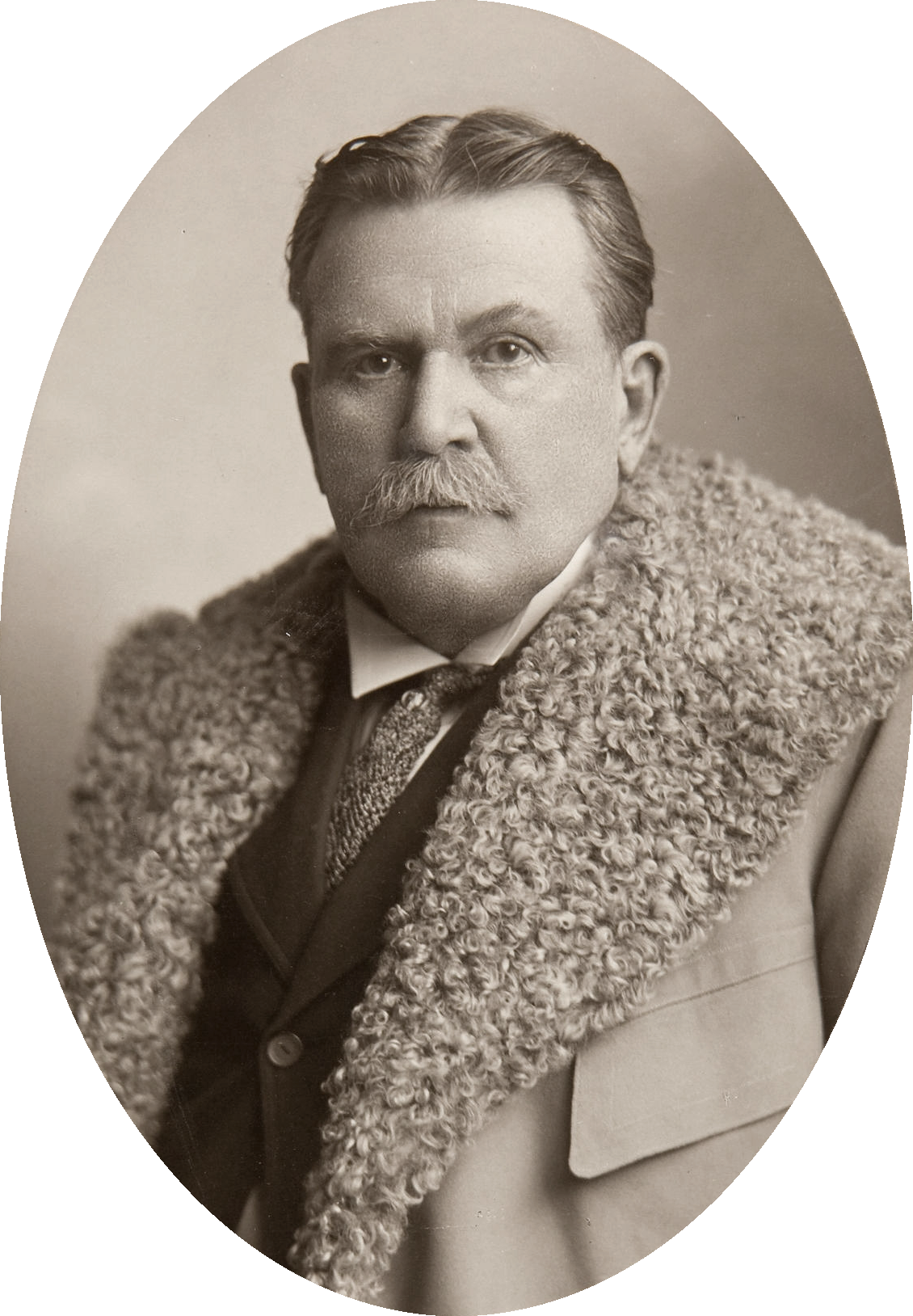
Carver in later life

After the breakup of his show Carver put together a smaller show, which featured trained animals and shooting exhibitions. His biographer wrote that Carver added the diving horse act to the show in Kansas City, Missouri, in August 1894. Carver told several versions of a story describing an exciting escape from bandits, which inspired the diving horse act, but those who remembered him in Nebraska said he got the idea after plunging on horseback off a bank into a deep hole in Medicine Creek. Over the next few years the other acts were eliminated, and the diving horse exhibition became Carver's primary endeavor. Included in the touring company were his son, Al, who helped train and take care of the horses, and his daughter, Lorena, said to be the first rider. By the time his future daughter-in-law, Sonora Webster, joined the show in 1924, Carver had two diving teams on the road, each performing in a different city.

In June 1927, Carver attended an Old-Timers' Convention in Norfolk, Nebraska, where he enjoyed reuniting with other frontiersmen. Following the convention he traveled to Omaha, Nebraska, and while there received word that his favorite horse had drowned following a dive into the Pacific Ocean. Sonora later wrote that the loss of the horse coupled with failing health seemed to diminish Carver's desire to live. He died on August 31, 1927, in Sacramento, California, and was buried beside his mother and sister in Winslow, Illinois. Sonora remembered that Carver was a stern and taciturn man but loved his horses and insisted that they be given the best of care.

Following Carver's death, the diving horse show continued with Al Carver at the helm. In October 1928 Al Carver and Sonora Webster were married. A short time later he signed a contract for a season's engagement at Atlantic City's Steel Pier, and the diving horse act became a permanent fixture there for several years. Sonora Webster Carver lost her eyesight in 1931 when her horse "Red Lips" dove into the tank off-balance, causing her to hit the water face first. She failed to close her eyes quickly enough, resulting in detached retinas. Though now blinded, Sonora continued with the act for eleven years. Her younger sister, Arnette Webster (later French), had joined the show in 1930 and started diving in 1931.

Al and Sonora Carver retired in 1942. The act finally closed as a result of pressure from animal rights groups in the 1970s. Sonora Carver, however, always contended that the horses were never forced to dive and, in fact, enjoyed the act. She died in September 2003, at the age of 99. Her early career inspired the 1991 Disney movie Wild Hearts Can't Be Broken, starring Gabrielle Anwar and based on Carver's memoir, A Girl and Five Brave Horses.
