= Sonora Webster Carver =

American memoirist

Sonora W. Carver
- Born: Sonora Webster; February 2, 1904; Waycross, Georgia
- Died: September 20, 2003 (aged 99); Pleasantville, New Jersey
- Occupation: Diving horse
- Spouse: Al Floyd Carver

Sonora Webster Carver (February 2, 1904 – September 20, 2003), was an American entertainer, most notable as one of the first female horse divers.

== Life ==
Webster answered an ad placed by William "Doc" Carver in 1923 for a diving girl and soon earned a place in circus history. Her job was to mount a running horse as it reached the top of a 40-foot (12 m)—in some cases 60-foot (18 m)—tower and sail down on its back as it plunged into an 11-foot (3.4 m) pool of water directly below. She was a sensation and soon became the lead diving girl for Doc's act as they traveled the country and the first diving girl quit.

In October 1928, Sonora married Doc's son, Albert (Al) Floyd Carver. Al had taken over the show in 1927, after the death of Dr. Carver. Sonora's sister Arnette Webster French followed in her footsteps, becoming a horse diver and joining the show in 1928.

In 1931, Sonora was blinded by retinal detachment, due to hitting the water off balance with her eyes open, while diving her horse, Red Lips, on Atlantic City's Steel Pier, the act's permanent home since 1929. After her accident she continued to dive horses until 1942. Arnette left the show in 1935.

Arnette explained Sonora's decision to continue riding after her accident in this way: "Riding the horse was the most fun you could have and we just loved it so. We didn't want to give it up. Once you were on the horse, there really wasn't much to do but hold on. The horse was in charge."

Arnette, who was 15 when she took her first horse dive, remarked in an interview that "Wherever we went, the S.P.C.A. [Society for the Prevention of Cruelty to Animals] was always snooping around, trying to find if we were doing anything that was cruel to animals. They never found anything because those horses lived the life of riley. In all the years of the act, there was never a horse that was injured."

Sonora's own account can be read in her 1961 book A Girl and Five Brave Horses. She died at the age of 99 on September 20, 2003. She lived in Pleasantville, New Jersey, at the time of her death.

== In popular culture ==
=== Film ===
Sonora Webster Carver's story is dramatized in a 1991 American drama film directed by Steve Miner called Wild Hearts Can't Be Broken, loosely based on events in her life as told in her memoir, A Girl and Five Brave Horses. Gabrielle Anwar stars as Carver alongside Michael Schoeffling and Cliff Robertson. Sonora herself was disappointed in the way that the movie depicted her life and career. She remarked to Arnette after screening it that "the only thing true in it was that I rode diving horses, I went blind, and I continued to ride for another 11 years."

=== Book ===
Jenni L. Walsh's Sonora (2025) is a fictionalized account of Sonora Webster Carver's life, from the moment she answers a want ad in the newspaper for a diving girl to her first dive blind.
