= Brett Ratner =

American filmmaker (born 1969)

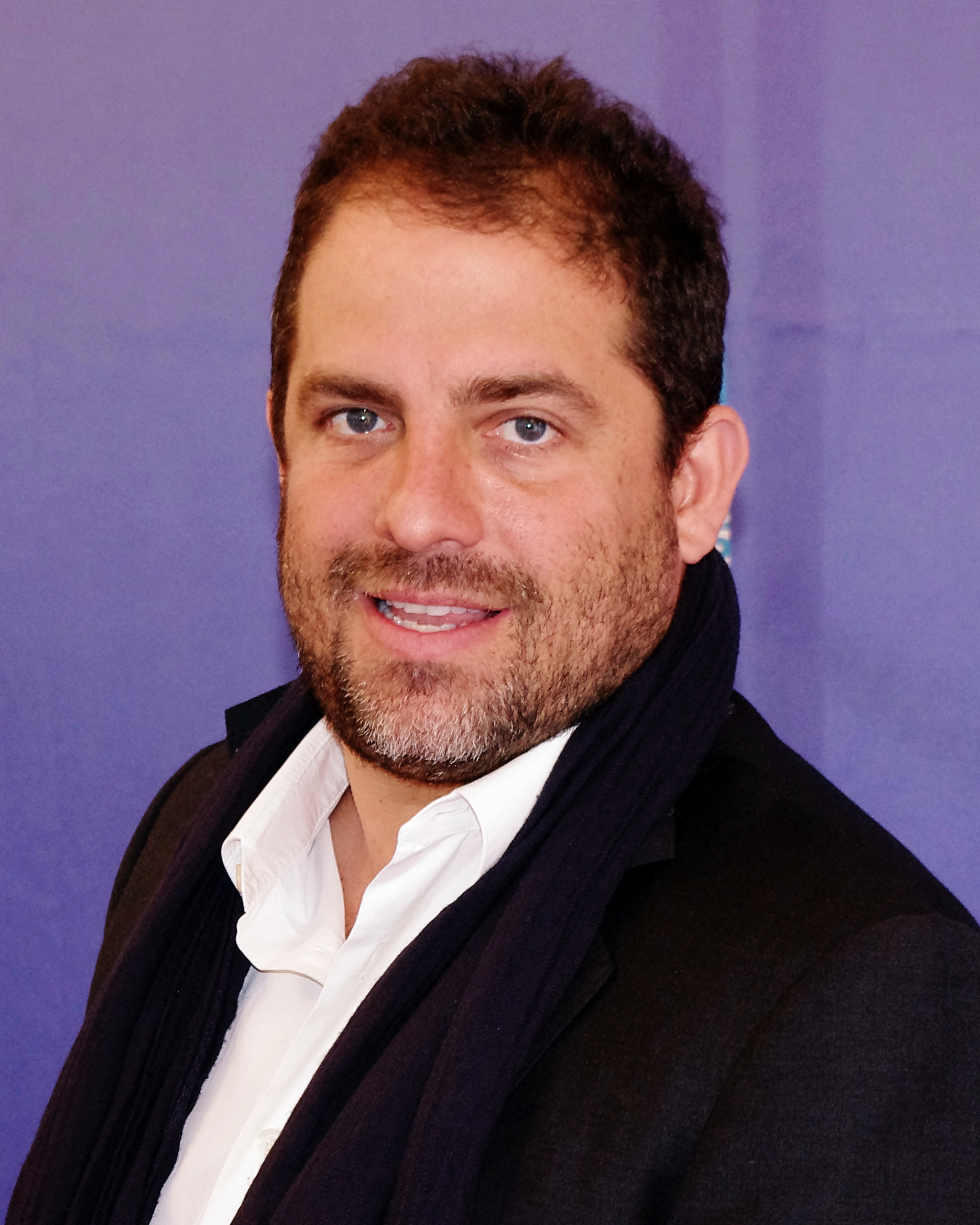
- Ratner in 2012
- Born: March 28, 1969 (age 57); Miami Beach, Florida, U.S.
- Education: New York University
- Occupations: Film director; producer
- Years active: 1988–2018; 2024–present

Brett Ratner (born March 28, 1969) is an American film director and producer. He directed the Rush Hour film series, The Family Man, Red Dragon, X-Men: The Last Stand, Tower Heist, Hercules, and Melania. He is a producer or executive producer of several films, including the Horrible Bosses series, The Revenant, and War Dogs, and the television series Prison Break.

Ratner directed his first feature film, Money Talks, in 1997. He is the co-founder of RatPac Entertainment, a film production company.

In 2017, numerous women in Hollywood came forward with allegations of rape and sexual assault by Ratner. This resulted in his business deals and prospective film projects getting canceled or scrapped, with Warner Bros. Pictures and talent agencies distancing themselves from him, and with Ratner subsequently emigrating to Israel.

== Early life and education ==
Brett Ratner was born in 1969 in Miami Beach, Florida, the son of Marsha Presman and Ronald Ratner. He grew up in a middle-class Jewish family. His grandfather was Lee Ratner, the d-CON mail order rat poison company founder and a real estate developer. His mother was born in Cuba and immigrated to the U.S. in the 1960s with her parents, Fanita and Mario Presman, whose families themselves originally moved to Cuba from Eastern Europe. Ratner's mother was sixteen when he was born.

Ratner has said that he "really didn't know" his biological father, and that he considers Alvin Malnik, a lawyer and businessman with alleged organized crime ties who opened the restaurant The Forge in Miami Beach, to be his father, "the one who raised" him. Malnik was a friend of Lee Ratner and not romantically involved with Marsha Presman. Ratner's biological father became homeless in Miami Beach, a situation which inspired Brett Ratner to become a board member of the nationwide nonprofit organization Chrysalis, which helps the homeless find work.

Ratner attended Rabbi Alexander S. Gross Hebrew Academy elementary school and attended Alexander Muss High School in Israel and graduated in 1986 from Miami Beach Senior High School. While growing up in Miami Beach, Ratner was an extra on the set of Scarface and was able to watch Miami Vice film around town. Shortly before his high school graduation, his mother and biological father married, with the intention of legitimizing his status.

Ratner attended New York University's Tisch School of the Arts, graduating in 1990. He later cited Martin Scorsese's 1980 film Raging Bull as his inspiration to enter the world of film.

== Career ==
=== Directing ===
Ratner began directing music videos in the 1990s. When he was a sophomore at New York University Tisch Schools of the Arts, he was manager and executive producer for B.M.O.C. (Big Man On Campus), one of the first white rap groups. While a student at NYU, he released his first short film Whatever Happened to Mason Reese?. The rap group Public Enemy attended the film's premiere and asked Ratner to make the group's music videos. Ratner did the debut videos for Prime Minister Pete Nice before working with Redman, LL Cool J, Heavy D and Wu-Tang Clan. He has directed music videos for artists such as Mariah Carey Madonna, Miley Cyrus, Jay-Z and was scheduled to direct a video for Michael Jackson before its production was cancelled. He directed Carey's "We Belong Together", "I Still Believe", "Obsessed" and "Heartbreaker" and others.

Ratner made his motion picture debut when he directed Money Talks in 1997. The film, an action-comedy about a con-man accused of organizing a prison break, was Ratner's first collaboration with comedian Chris Tucker. Receiving mostly negative reviews, the film's budget was $25 million. In 1998, he directed Rush Hour, an action-comedy starring Jackie Chan and Chris Tucker, which was released in September 1998 and went on to become the studio's highest-grossing film and the highest grossing comedy at the time. Ratner uses music on the set to inspire the production, and when filming Rush Hour, a Michael Jackson song he played for inspiration ended up in the film after Chris Tucker began dancing in the middle of a scene.

Ratner directed The Family Man, a drama starring Nicolas Cage, in 2000. In 2001, Ratner directed Rush Hour 2. In 2002, he directed Red Dragon, the prequel to The Silence of the Lambs, about Hannibal Lecter. In 2004, Ratner directed After the Sunset, starring Pierce Brosnan and Salma Hayek. The action comedy film revolves around a master thief pulling off one last big score, with an FBI agent in hot pursuit. In 2006, Ratner directed X-Men: The Last Stand, then directed Rush Hour 3, which was released in 2007. Ratner directed a television commercial for Wynn Las Vegas featuring Steve Wynn on top of Encore Las Vegas in 2008.

In 2010, Ratner directed the ensemble comedy caper Tower Heist, starring Ben Stiller and Eddie Murphy. The film was originally based on an idea from Murphy titled 'Trump Heist' and was about disgruntled employees of Donald Trump planning to rob Trump Tower, though references to Trump were removed from the film. In early 2021, Ratner announced that he would direct a long-gestated Milli Vanilli biopic, which would have been his first project since Paramount's 2014 film Hercules for Millennium Media. In February 2021, Millennium Media stated it would not be moving forward with Ratner's project. As of November 2025, Ratner has been developing a fourth Rush Hour film. President Trump reportedly played a role in reviving the project.

In October 2017, during the MeToo movement, a former talent agency employee accused Ratner of rape. On November 1, 2017, six women, including Olivia Munn and Natasha Henstridge, accused Ratner of sexual assault and harassment, as well as following an actress into a bathroom without invitation and masturbating as another entered his trailer to deliver food. The same month, Elliot Page accused Ratner of sexual harassment and outing the then-18-year-old Page as lesbian (before Page came out as a trans man) in front of many onlookers including Anna Paquin, who later confirmed the story. A former fashion model came forward regarding an incident involving Russell Simmons and Ratner back in 1991, when Simmons coerced her to perform oral sex while Ratner was present.

On November 1, 2017, the same day as the allegations of six women, Warner Bros. announced it had severed ties with Ratner. Afterwards, Ratner announced that he was "[stepping] away from all Warner Bros.–related activities" and Warner Bros. was reviewing the issue. In April 2018, Warner Bros. announced that they would not renew their $450-million co-producing deal with RatPac. Ratner has denied the 2017 allegations of sexual harassment and assault against him.

In January 2026, Ratner made his return to directing with Melania, about incumbent First Lady Melania Trump in the twenty days leading up to the second inauguration of her husband, Donald Trump, as the 47th President of the United States. Melania served as a producer, and filming began in December 2024, one month after Donald Trump won the presidential election. Amazon MGM Studios acquired the rights to the film, and released it in theaters on January 30, 2026. The film received overwhelmingly negative reviews from critics, who criticized its self-promotional or propagandistic nature, and was a box-office bomb, grossing $16.7 million on a $40 million production budget. It began streaming on Amazon Prime Video on March 9, 2026.

=== Producing ===
Ratner was executive producer of the television series Prison Break, which aired from 2005 to 2009, and directed its pilot episode. In 2011, Ratner produced the TV documentary, American Masters: Woody Allen – A Documentary. That same year, he produced Horrible Bosses, a comedy about employees plotting to kill their bosses. Horrible Bosses opened at the domestic box office with $28.1 million in its first weekend. Ratner produced a remake of Snow White, Mirror Mirror (2012), based on the screenplay The Brothers Grimm: Snow White by Melisa Wallack.

In 2014, he produced Horrible Bosses 2, the sequel to his 2011 film. Ratner executive-produced the Rush Hour TV series based on the Rush Hour film series. In 2015, Ratner produced Black Mass, a biopic about gangster James "Whitey" Bulger, played by Johnny Depp. The same year, Ratner was executive producer of The Revenant, starring Leonardo DiCaprio. He was an executive producer on the 2016 film War Dogs, directed by Todd Phillips and starring Jonah Hill and Miles Teller.

=== RatPac Entertainment ===
In December 2012, Ratner and Australian media mogul James Packer formed a joint venture, RatPac Entertainment. The firm will produce independent films and co-produce big-budget films with a major studio. Packer's stake in the company was later bought out by Len Blavatnik's First Access Entertainment. The company makes 25 films annually. By 2017, the company co-financed over 50 films which had 51 Oscar nominations and earned a total of over $10 billion in box office.

RatPac and Dune Entertainment formed a film investment vehicle, which in September 2013, entered a multi-year, 75-film co-producing partnership with Warner Bros. The company has partnered with New Regency, advertising firm WPP, CMC Capital Partners, and Shanghai Media Group. Ratner worked with CMC to form a fund aimed at investments in Chinese media companies.

Ratner made $40 million after the release of Gravity, which was RatPac's first investment. In June 2014, Ratner's RatPac Entertainment and Class 5 Films acquired the film rights to the non-fiction article "American Hippopotamus", by Jon Mooallem, about the meat shortage in the U.S. in 1910 to import hippopotamuses. The film was produced by Ratner in collaboration with Edward Norton and William Migliore.

On April 18, 2017, Access Entertainment, a subsidiary of Access Industries, acquired James Packer's ownership stake in RatPac. The next year, Warner Bros. announced that they were cutting ties with the company after Brett Ratner's sexual harassment allegations with Rampage as the final film to be co-financed by the company with Warner Bros., and the final film produced by RatPac overall. In November 2018, RatPac-Dune's minority ownership stake in a library of 76 Warner Bros. films was put up for sale, with investors in the fund backing the library to cash out. Vine Alternative Investments made a high bid for the library, but in January 2019, Warner Bros. exercised their rights to match the bid for the library and essentially acquired RatPac-Dune's stakes. The cost was estimated at nearly $300 million.

=== Screen appearances ===
Ratner appeared on the MTV series Punk'd when Hugh Jackman, who portrays Wolverine in the X-Men films, was the subject of a practical joke that made it appear Ratner's $3.6 million home in Beverly Hills was destroyed by a BBQ grill explosion. Ashton Kutcher later arrived at his home and hugged him. In April 2007, Fox announced that he, Carrie Fisher, Garry Marshall and Jon Avnet would be the judges for the network's filmmaking-competition/reality TV series, On the Lot.

He appeared as himself in an episode of the television series Entourage, which was shot at his Beverly Hills home. In 2009, Ratner created The Shooter Series which compiled his work, including interviews with Ratner, and a short film about Mickey Rourke's transition into boxing.

=== Other projects ===
In 2009, Ratner established Rat Press, a publishing company. The company reissued a Playboy interview with Marlon Brando and Robert Evans as well as an account of NFL player Jim Brown, and released a book of Scott Caan's photographs. In 2011, Ratner established Rat TV with 20th Century Fox Television. He brought former NBC development executive Chris Conti on as president of the venture.

On August 4, 2011, the Academy of Motion Picture Arts and Sciences announced that Ratner would produce the 84th Academy Awards with Don Mischer. However, Ratner resigned on November 8, 2011, after remarking that "rehearsal is for fags". Ratner later apologized for his remarks. Eddie Murphy, who was scheduled to host the ceremony, also resigned in deference to a new production team. Ratner was replaced by Brian Grazer, and Murphy was replaced by previous Oscar host Billy Crystal.

Ratner announced the Brett Ratner Florida Student Filmmaker Scholarship at the Key West Film Festival in 2015. The $5,000 scholarship was awarded to The Cook, The Knife and The Rabbit's Finger, which was directed by Agustina Bonventura and Nicolas Casanas. Ratner worked with international beverage brand Diageo to produce The Hilhaven Lodge, a blended whiskey named for his Beverly Hills estate. The bottle is modeled after the estate and features a wood cork, and the bottle is shaped to resemble bay windows. The drink is a mixture of 26-year-old rye, 15-year-old Tennessee whiskey, and six-year bourbon.

Ratner delivered a keynote address as part of the Cannes Film Festival in May 2017 where he referred to the television medium as the future of production. Ratner participated in the eighth annual Cannes Film Finance Forum. In March 2017, Ratner spoke out against the film review aggregation site Rotten Tomatoes at the Sun Valley Film Festival, calling it a destructive force in the film industry. He expressed respect for traditional film critics and said the site reduces film criticism to a number.

Ratner has served on the boards of the Simon Wiesenthal Center and Museum of Tolerance, Chrysalis, Ghetto Film School, Best Buddies, and the Los Angeles Police Foundation. He served on the dean's council of NYU Tisch School of the Arts and serves on the board of directors of Tel Aviv University's School of Film and Television. He donated $1 million to the Academy Museum of Motion Pictures in 2013.

== Personal life ==
Ratner had a 13-year relationship with actress Rebecca Gayheart beginning when Ratner was 17 and Gayheart was 15. From 2004 to 2006, Ratner dated Serena Williams and appeared on an episode of Venus and Serena: For Real, the Williams sisters' reality show.

In September 2023, Ratner emigrated to Israel. Ratner is friends with Israeli prime minister Benjamin Netanyahu, and was invited by Netanyahu to attend his speech at the United Nations General Assembly.

A photo released in December 2025 as part of the Epstein files showed Ratner posing with Jean-Luc Brunel, an associate of financier and child sex trafficker Jeffrey Epstein. Further images released in January 2026 showed Ratner sitting on a sofa with Epstein and two young women, Brett Ratner's then fiancé, and appearing with Epstein, Brunel and three women on a separate occasion.

== Filmography ==
=== Film ===
Director

Year	Title	Distribution
1997	Money Talks	New Line Cinema
1998	Rush Hour	New Line Cinema
2000	The Family Man	Universal Pictures
2001	Rush Hour 2	New Line Cinema
2002	Red Dragon	Universal Pictures
2004	After the Sunset	New Line Cinema
2006	X-Men: The Last Stand	20th Century Fox
2007	Rush Hour 3	New Line Cinema
2011	Tower Heist	Universal Pictures
2014	Hercules	Paramount Pictures
2026	Melania	Amazon MGM Studios

Producer

- Double Take (2001)
- Paid in Full (2002)
- After the Sunset (2004) (Uncredited)
- Santa's Slay (2005)
- Running Scared (2006)
- Code Name: The Cleaner (2007)
- Mother's Day (2010)
- Kites (2010) (English-language version)
- Horrible Bosses (2011)
- Mirror Mirror (2012)
- CZ12 (2012) (Uncredited)
- Hercules (2014)
- Horrible Bosses 2 (2014)
- Barely Lethal (2015)
- I Saw the Light (2015)
- Truth (2015)
- Dark Crimes (2016)
- Rules Don't Apply (2016)
- Georgetown (2019)
- Melania (2026)

Executive producer

- A Ribbon of Dreams (2002)
- End Game (2006) (Direct-to-video)
- 21 (2008)
- Skyline (2010)
- The Water Diviner (2014)
- Jersey Boys (2014)
- Black Mass (2015)
- The Revenant (2015)
- War Dogs (2016)
- The Lego Ninjago Movie (2017)

Executive soundtrack producer

- Rush Hour (1998)

=== Short film ===
Director

Year	Title	Notes
1990	Whatever Happened to Mason Reese	Also screenwriter and producer
2001	Lady Luck	
2008	New York, I Love You	Segment "5"
2013	Movie 43	Segment "Happy Birthday"

Executive producer

- Velocity Rules (2001)
- Me and Daphne (2002)
- Kill Them Mommy! (2015)

Producer

Year	Title	Notes
2006	Becker Hargrove, Inc.	
2009	I Knew It Was You: Rediscovering John Cazale	Documentary short
2015	The 100 Years Show	Documentary short
2015	Fun Size Horror: Volume Two	
2015	The Audition	

=== Documentary film ===
Producer

- Before, During and 'After the Sunset' (2005) (Video)
- Night Will Fall (2014)
- Electric Boogaloo: The Wild,
  Untold Story of Cannon Films (2014)
- One Day Since Yesterday: Peter Bogdanovich & the Lost American Film (2014)
- Chuck Norris vs. Communism (2015)
- S is for Stanley (2015)
- In the Name of Honor (2015)
- Before the Flood (2016)
- Author: The J.T. Leroy Story (2016)
- Melania (2026)

Executive producer

- Catfish (2010)
- By Sidney Lumet (2015)

=== Television ===
TV movies

Year	Title	Director	Executive producer
1999	Partners	Yes	Yes
2005	Untitled David Diamond/David Weissman Project	Yes	Yes
2008	Blue Blood	Yes	Yes
2009	Cop House	Yes	Yes
2009	Prison Break: The Final Break	No	Yes
2011	Rogue	Yes	Yes

TV series

Year	Title	Director	Executive producer	Notes
2005–2009	Prison Break	Yes	Yes	Directed episode "Pilot"
2007	Entourage	No	No	Role: himself, Episode "The Prince's Bride"
2007	Women's Murder Club	No	Yes	
2011	CHAOS	No	Yes	
2014	30 for 30	Yes	Yes	Directed episode "Mysteries of the Jules Rimet Trophy"
2015	Rush Hour	No	Yes	
2017	American Masters	No	Yes	

Documentary works

Year	Title	Director	Executive producer	Notes
1999	Making the Video	Yes	No	Episodes "Maria Carey: Heartbreaker" and "Maria Carey: It's Like That"
2007	Helmut by June	No	Yes	
2011	Nick Cannon: Mr. Show Biz	No	Yes	
2015	Bright Lights: Starring Carrie Fisher and Debbie Reynolds	No	Yes	
2015	Breakthrough	Yes	No	Episode "Decoding the Brain"

=== Music video ===
Year	Title	Artist
1988	"Louder Than a Bomb"	Public Enemy
1993	"Rat Bastard"	Prime Minister Pete Nice & Daddy Rich
1993	"Kick the Bobo"	Prime Minister Pete Nice & Daddy Rich
1993	"Stay Real"	Erick Sermon
1993	"Tonight's da Night"	Redman
1993	"Pink Cookies In a Plastic Bag Getting Crushed By Buildings"	LL Cool J
1994	"Nuttin' but Love"	Heavy D & the Boyz
1994	"I'll Take Her"	Ill Al Skratch featuring Brian McKnight
1994	"I Like the Way You Work"	Blackstreet
1995	"Freek'n You"	Jodeci
1995	"Love U 4 Life"	Jodeci
1995	"Every Little Thing I Do"	Soul for Real
1995	"Brown Sugar"	D'Angelo
1995	"Who Do U Love"	Deborah Cox
1995	"Sex Wit You"	Heavy D & the Boyz
1995	"Cruisin'"	D'Angelo
1995	"(You Make Me Feel Like) A Natural Woman"	Mary J. Blige
1996	"Lady" (DJ Premier Remix)	D'Angelo featuring AZ
1996	"Don't Wanna Lose You"	Lionel Richie
1997	"I'll Be"	Foxy Brown
1997	"No Doubt"	702
1997	"Invisible Man"	98 Degrees
1997	"Triumph"	Wu-Tang Clan
1998	"How Deep Is Your Love"	Dru Hill
1999	"I Still Believe"	Mariah Carey
1999	"Beautiful Stranger"	Madonna
1999	"Heartbreaker"	Mariah Carey
1999	"Thank God I Found You"	Mariah Carey
2000	"This Could Be Heaven"	Seal
2001	"Diddy"	P. Diddy
2005	"It's Like That"	Mariah Carey
2005	"We Belong Together"	Mariah Carey
2005	"These Boots Are Made for Walkin'"	Jessica Simpson
2006	"Make Them Suffer"	Cannibal Corpse
2006	"A Public Affair"	Jessica Simpson
2006	"Samantha"	Courtney Love
2008	"7 Things"	Miley Cyrus
2008	"Touch My Body"	Mariah Carey
2008	"Just Like Me"	Jamie Foxx
2008	"When You Leave (Numa Numa)" (Basshunter Remix)	Alina
2009	"Obsessed"	Mariah Carey
2009	"H.A.T.E.U."	Mariah Carey
2011	"Mrs. Right"	Mindless Behavior
2015	"Infinity"	Mariah Carey
