= Melody Thomas Scott =

American actress (born 1956)

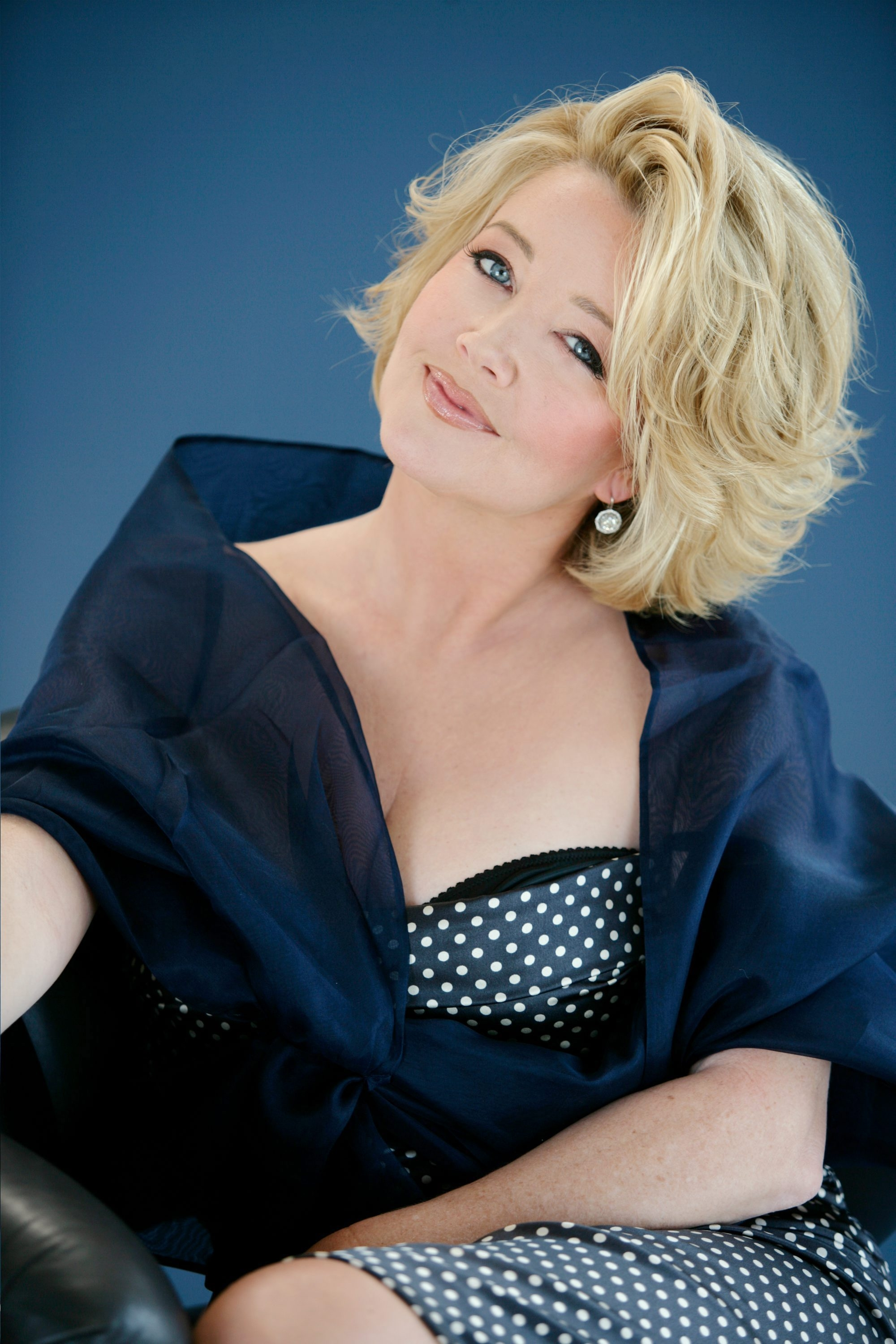
- Melody Thomas Scott in 2007
- Born: Melody Ann Thomas; April 18, 1956 (age 70); Los Angeles, California, U.S.
- Occupation: Actress
- Years active: 1963–present
- Spouses: Lindy Davis (m. 1979; div. 1979) Bob Shield (m. 1980, divorced) Edward J. Scott (m. 1985)
- Children: 3

Melody Thomas Scott (born Melody Ann Thomas, April 18, 1956) is an American actress. She began her career as a child actress appearing in the psychological thriller film, Marnie. She later appeared in films The Beguiled (1971), Posse (1975), The Shootist (1976), The Car (1977), The Fury (1978) and Piranha (1978). In 1979 she began starring as Nikki Newman on the CBS daytime soap opera, The Young and the Restless.

== Life and career ==
Scott was born Melody Ann Thomas in Los Angeles. Her first film credit was as a child actress in the 1964 Alfred Hitchcock movie Marnie. On television, she guest-starred on My Three Sons, Wagon Train and Ironside. She had supporting roles in the psychological thriller film The Beguiled (1971), and the Western films Posse (1975) and The Shootist (1976) in which she becomes the last actress to exchange lines with John Wayne. In the late 1970s, Scott made number-of guest appearances on nighttime series such as, The Rockford Files, Charlie's Angels, and a recurring role on The Waltons. She co-starred in the 1977 supernatural horror film The Car and the following year appeared in the horror films The Fury and Piranha.

In 1979, at the age of 23, Scott took over the role of Nikki Reed, a poor girl from the wrong side of the tracks, on the daytime serial The Young and the Restless, choosing the part over a sitcom pilot that in the end was not picked up. She was a replacement for the previous Nikki, who had lasted six months. Over time, her character reformed and became an important part of Genoa City society, as she married Victor Newman (Eric Braeden). Scott has said, "It's a miracle for an actor to have a job last 35 years. I am so blessed." In 1999, she received Daytime Emmy Awards nomination for Outstanding Lead Actress in a Drama Series.

Scott has made guest-starring appearances in a number of prime time series, such as Hotel, Diagnosis Murder, The Nanny, The King of Queens, My Name Is Earl and Castle. She was a celebrity guest on The $25,000 Pyramid for a week in June 1985.

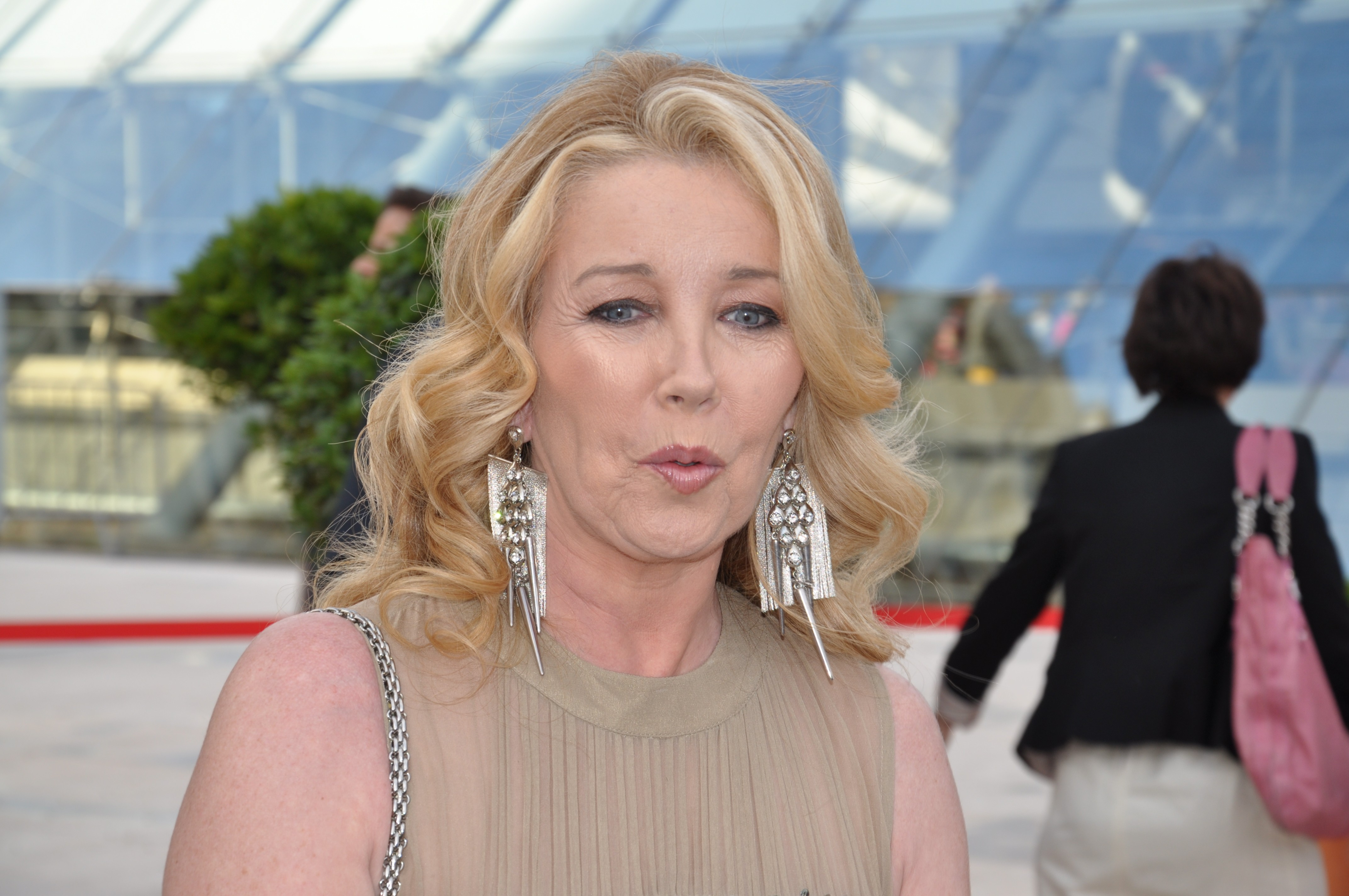
Scott at the 2013 Monte-Carlo Television Festival

On February 19, 2019 The Young and the Restless featured a stand-alone episode to honor Scott's 40-year history with the serial. In 2024, Scott received the Daytime Emmy Lifetime Achievement Award.

== Personal life ==
On the set of The Young and the Restless, she met her third husband, the show's executive producer Edward J. Scott. They married in 1985 and have three daughters, Jennifer (his daughter from a previous marriage), Alexandra Danielle Yeaggy (father is the late Carlos Yeaggy, a makeup artist Melody met on the set of Y&R.) and Elizabeth. The family resides in Beverly Hills, California. Jennifer gave birth to twins on May 25, 2011, a boy named James and a girl named Charlotte. James and Charlotte are Melody and Edward's first and second grandchild, respectively.

== Filmography ==
=== Film ===
Year	Title	Role	Notes
1964	Marnie	young Marnie	Uncredited
1971	The Beguiled	Abigail	(as Melody Thomas)
1975	Posse	Laurie	(as Melody Thomas)
1976	The Shootist	Girl on streetcar	(as Melody Thomas)
1977	The Car	Suzie Pullbrook	(as Melody Thomas)
1978	The Fury	LaRue	(as Melody Thomas)
1978	Piranha	Laura Dickinson	(as Melody Thomas)
2005	Freezerburn	Jill Renzie the Moviestar	

=== Television ===
Year	Title	Role	Notes
1965	Wagon Train	Samantha	Episode: "The Katy Piper Story" (as Melody Thomas)
1969	Ironside	Leslie Richards	Episode: "Goodbye to Yesterday" (as Melody Thomas)
1977	Secrets	Laura Fleming	TV movie (as Melody Thomas)
1977	Code R	Linda	Episode: "The Firebug" (as Melody Thomas)
1977	Fish	Joanie Kellen	Episode: "The Neighbors" (as Melody Thomas)
1977	The Waltons	Darlene Jarvis	Episodes: "The Go-Getter" and "The Seashore" (as Melody Thomas)
1978	Charlie's Angels	Betsy Harper	Episodes: "The Sandcastle Murders" (as Melody Thomas)
1979	Makin' It	Carol / Paula	Episodes: "Stayin' Alive" and "Tony's Homecoming" (as Melody Thomas)
1979	Billy	Shirley	Episode: "Computer Dating" (as Melody Thomas)
1979	The Rockford Files	Sherry	Episode: "Lions, Tigers, Monkeys and Dogs, Part 1" (as Melody Thomas)
1979–present	The Young and the Restless	Nikki Newman	Series regular
1980	The Scarlett O'Hara War	Laurie Lee	TV movie (as Melody Thomas)
1985	Hotel	Mandy Vinning	Episode: "Sleeping Dogs" (as Melody Thomas)
1997	The Nanny	Herself	Episode: "The Heather Biblow Story"
2001	The King of Queens	Nikki Newman	Episode: "Inner Tube"
2003	The Paradise Virus	Linda Flemming	TV movie
2007	My Name Is Earl	Pill Popping Mom	Episode: "The Birthday Party"
2011	Castle	Tonya Wellington	Episode: "Nikki Heat"
2014	The Crazy Ones	Flora	Episode: "The Monster"
2022	The Bold and the Beautiful	Nikki Newman	Guest: 1 episode (September 26, 2022)

== Awards and nominations ==
Year	Award	Category	Work	Result
1991	8th Telegatto Awards	Best Actress	The Young and the Restless	Won
1995	11th Soap Opera Digest Awards	Outstanding Actress	The Young and the Restless	Nominated
1999	26th Daytime Emmy Awards	Outstanding Lead Actress	The Young and the Restless	Nominated
2001	17th Soap Opera Digest Awards	Outstanding Actress	The Young and the Restless	Won

== See also ==
- Victor Newman and Nikki Reed
- Supercouple
