= Let's Get Harry =

1986 film by Stuart Rosenberg

- French film poster
- Directed by: Stuart Rosenberg (Note: Credited as Alan Smithee.)
- Screenplay by: Charles Robert Carner
- Story by: Mark Feldberg; Samuel Fuller
- Produced by: Daniel H. Blatt; Robert Singer
- Starring: Michael Schoeffling; Thomas F. Wilson; Glenn Frey; Rick Rossovich; Ben Johnson; Mark Harmon; Gary Busey; Robert Duvall
- Cinematography: James A. Contner
- Music by: Brad Fiedel
- Production company: Delphi V Productions
- Distributed by: Tri-Star Pictures
- Release date: October 31, 1986
- Running time: 102 minutes
- Country: United States
- Language: English
- Box office: $140,980

Let's Get Harry is a 1986 American adventure film directed by Stuart Rosenberg. It stars Michael Schoeffling, Thomas F. Wilson, Glenn Frey, Rick Rossovich, Ben Johnson, Mark Harmon, Gary Busey, and Robert Duvall. The film direction is credited to Alan Smithee, a pseudonym used by directors who repudiate their involvement in a film.

== Plot ==
In Colombia, an American engineer named Harry Burck is overseeing the opening of his company's water pipeline. In the middle of the unveiling ceremony, a group of rebels arrives to kidnap an American diplomat who is in attendance. In the process, Harry is also kidnapped.

Word of the kidnapping reaches Harry's brother Corey and his friends Bob, Spence, and Kurt, who were all awaiting Harry's return. The men, coworkers at a factory, learn that Harry's kidnapping was orchestrated by a drug lord named Carlos Ochobar. Corey and Bob travel to Washington, D.C. to seek assistance from the U.S. government, only to be told that there are no plans to mount a rescue. Harry's father, Harry Burck, Sr., is despondent over the kidnapping of his son.

Kurt reminds his friends that they all personally owe Harry something, and that their only choice is to rescue him themselves. Despite some resistance and skepticism from Kurt and Spence, all the men eventually agree to go. Before heading to Colombia, they enlist the financial help of a sympathetic local car salesman, Jack, who insists on going along as a condition of funding the rescue, and the military expertise of a mercenary named Norman Shrike. Due to the urgency of the mission, Shrike is only able to give the group perfunctory training in military tactics.

Once in Colombia, the group encounters resistance, both from local officials and from the U.S. government. The group eventually lands in jail after being set up by one of Shrike's contacts who was going to supply them with weapons. They are handed over to U.S. officials and put on a plane back to the U.S. Just prior to takeoff, the group manages to escape, but Kurt decides to give up and go home.

The group resumes their trek toward Ochobar's camp. Eventually, they are engaged by rebels. Shrike is killed in a firefight while saving one of the men's lives. The group ventures on with the help of a local woman, Veronica, and they eventually find Ochobar's hideout. In the ensuing shootout with Ochobar's men, Jack is killed. The group is able to save Harry and escape, destroying Ochobar's camp in the process. Harry and the men return home to a hero's welcome.

== Cast ==
- Michael Schoeffling as Corey Burck
- Thomas F. Wilson as Bob Pachowski
- Rick Rossovich as Kurt Klein
- Ben Johnson as Harry Burck Sr.
- Glenn Frey as Spence
- Mark Harmon as Harry Burck Jr.
- Gary Busey as Jack Abernathy
- Robert Duvall as Norman Shrike
- Elpidia Carrillo as Veronica
- Matt Clark as Walt Clayton
- Bruce Gray as Ambassador Douglas
- Guillermo Rios as Carlos Ochobar
- Jerry Hardin as Dean Reilly
- David Hess as Mercenary
- Terry Camilleri as Mercenary
- Pierrino Mascarino as Pinilla
- Jon Van Ness as Mickey
- Gregory Sierra as Alphonso
- Rodolfo De Alexandre as Pablo
- John Wesley as Mercenary
- Cecile Callan as Theresa
- James Keane as Al King
- J.W. Smith as Mercenary
- Jere Burns as Washington Aide
- Eusebio Dominguez as Elite Military

== Production ==
In the director's cut of the film, Mark Harmon does not make an appearance of any kind until the final rescue sequence. Prior to the planned release, Harmon's popularity grew dramatically due to his work on St. Elsewhere and being named "Sexiest Man Alive" by People magazine, and the producers wanted to make Harmon more at the center of the story over Rosenberg's objection. Additional footage was shot featuring Harmon's abduction and being held as a hostage. As a result, Rosenberg renounced the film, deciding to be credited as Alan Smithee.

== Release ==
The film was released on October 31, 1986, in 133 theatres regionally in the United States and grossed $140,980 for the weekend.

== Home media ==
For many years, Let's Get Harry was only available on VHS and LaserDisc without a DVD release. In 2024, Viavision released a limited-edition Blu-ray release of the film.

== See also ==
- List of American films of 1986
