= The Paradise Virus =

- Directed by: Brian Trenchard-Smith
- Starring: Lorenzo Lamas; Melody Thomas Scott; Ralf Moeller
- Country of origin: United States
- Original language: English

Original release
- Release: February 14, 2003

The Paradise Virus is a 2003 thriller film directed by Brian Trenchard-Smith shot on Grand Turk Island. The film sold widely and the producers later worked with Trenchard-Smith on Long Lost Son (2006).
