= Gabrielle Anwar =

British actress (born 1970)

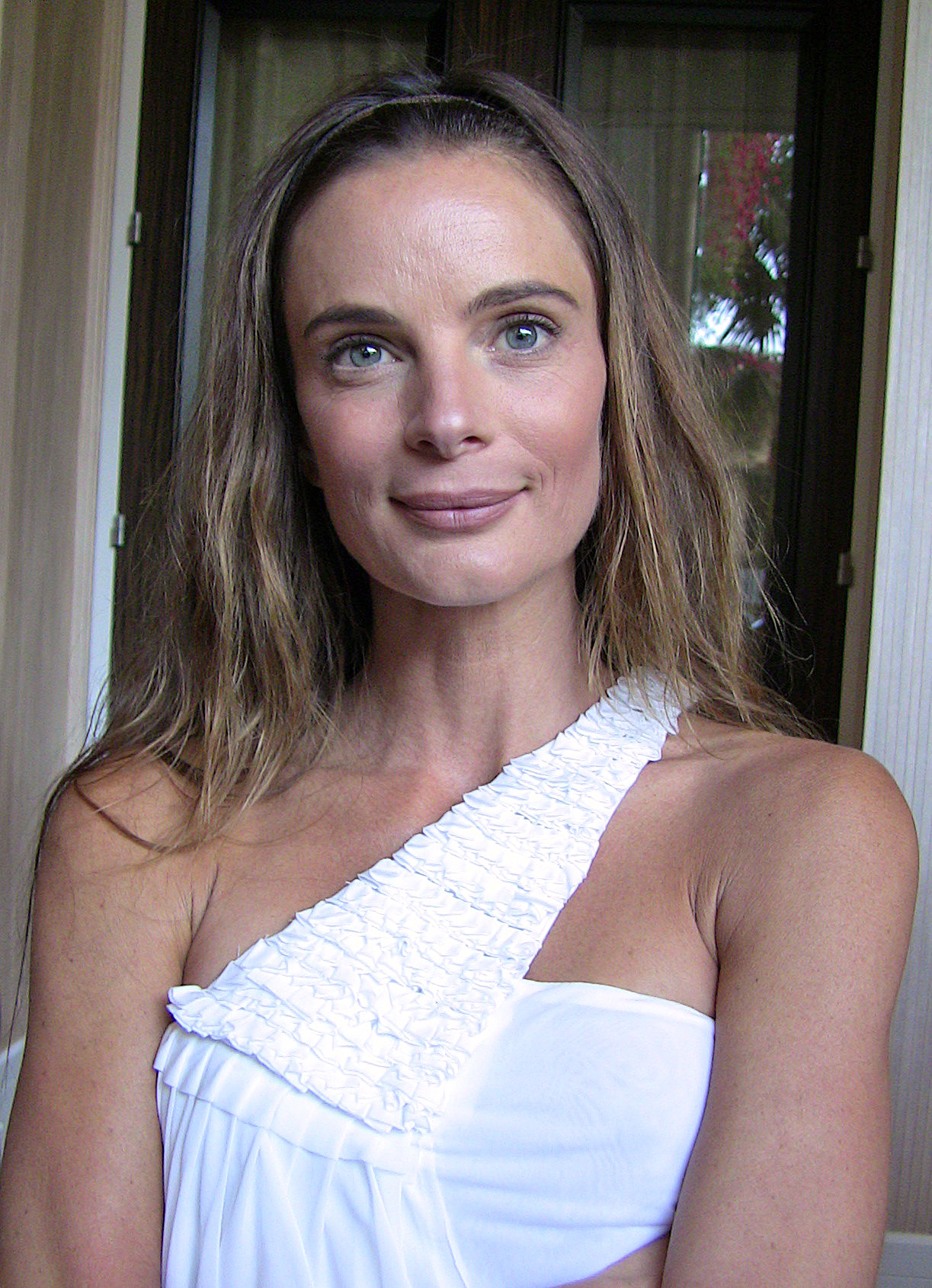
- Anwar in 2009
- Born: 4 February 1970 (age 56); Laleham, Surrey, England
- Citizenship: United Kingdom; United States (since 2008)
- Education: Italia Conti Academy of Theatre Arts
- Occupation: Actress
- Years active: 1985–present
- Spouses: John Verea (m. 2000; div. 2005) Shareef Malnik (m. 2015)
- Partner: Craig Sheffer (1989–1990s)
- Children: 3
- Father: Tariq Anwar
- Relatives: Alvin Malnik (father-in-law)

Gabrielle Anwar (born 4 February 1970) is an English actress. She is known for her television roles as Sam Black in the second series of Press Gang, as Margaret Tudor in the first season of The Tudors, as Lady Tremaine in the seventh season of Once Upon a Time, and for her starring role as Fiona Glenanne on the USA network television series Burn Notice (2007–13).

== Early life and education ==
Anwar was born in Laleham, Surrey. Her mother was Shirley Hills, an English actress, show host, and chef. Her father is Tariq Anwar, an Indian-British film producer and editor. Her paternal grandmother, Edith Reich, was an Austrian Jew, while her paternal grandfather was an Indian Muslim.

She attended Laleham C of E Primary and Middle School from 1975 to 1982; an end-of-term St Trinian's sketch in the school concert of 1982 gave an early indication of her theatrical leanings. Anwar studied drama and dance at the Italia Conti Academy of Theatre Arts in London.

== Career ==
Anwar's acting debut was in the 1986 British miniseries Hideaway. She also starred in the music video to Paul McCartney's "Pretty Little Head". Her feature film début was Manifesto (1988), which was followed by more British television productions including First Born, Summer's Lease, Press Gang, and The Mysteries of the Dark Jungle. While working on films and television in London, she met American actor Craig Sheffer, and moved with him to Hollywood. Anwar and Sheffer have co-starred in a number of American films together, such as In Pursuit of Honor, The Grave, Turbulence 3: Heavy Metal, Flying Virus, Save It for Later, Water Under the Bridge, and Long Lost Son.

Her first American film was If Looks Could Kill, in which she played the daughter of a murdered British agent (played by Roger Daltrey). She also appeared in Tom Petty and the Heartbreakers' music video for Into the Great Wide Open. In 1992, she made a guest appearance on Beverly Hills, 90210 as competitive ice skater Tricia Kinney, who has a brief romance with Brandon Walsh. She starred in Wild Hearts Can't Be Broken (inspired by A Girl and Five Brave Horses), and one of her most memorable moments on screen was in 1992's Scent of a Woman, when she danced a tango with Al Pacino, whose character was blind. She followed that with the films Body Snatchers, For Love or Money, and The Three Musketeers. In 1994, People magazine named her one of the 50 most beautiful people in the world. In 1995, she starred in Things to Do in Denver When You're Dead.

In 2000, Anwar played Sophie in The Guilty. She also appeared in the television series John Doe (2002–2003) and acted in The Librarian: Return to King Solomon's Mines (2006). In 2007, she played Princess Margaret, sister of King Henry VIII, on Showtime's The Tudors. After that, she starred as Fiona Glenanne in the television series Burn Notice from 2007 to 2013. In 2008, Anwar made an appearance as Eva Sintzel, a woman trying to get pregnant through the fictitious Hudson Cryobank in the Law & Order: SVU episode "Inconceivable". She also played a role in the seventh season of Once Upon a Time.

== Personal life ==
Anwar was in a relationship with actor Craig Sheffer, with whom she has a daughter (born 1993). From 2000 to 2005, she was married to actor John Verea, with whom she has a son and a daughter. Sheffer is godfather to Anwar's two children with Verea.

In April 2010, Anwar began dating Shareef Malnik, son of Alvin Malnik. In August 2015, they were married in Montana. They live in Palm Island, Florida.

Anwar became a naturalised American citizen in 2008. In 2023, Anwar co-founded ReThink Baby, an organization promoting the principles of early childhood educator Emmi Pikler.

== Filmography ==
=== Film ===
Year	Title	Role	Notes
1988	Manifesto	Tina	
1991	If Looks Could Kill	Mariska Blade	
1991	Wild Hearts Can't Be Broken	Sonora Webster	
1992	Scent of a Woman	Donna	
1993	Body Snatchers	Marti Malone	
1993	For Love or Money	Andy Hart	
1993	The Three Musketeers	Anne of Austria	
1995	Things to Do in Denver When You're Dead	Dagney	
1995	Innocent Lies	Celia Graves	
1996	The Grave	Jordan	
1997	Nevada	Linny	
1997	Sub Down	Laura Dyson	Direct-to-video
1998	Beach Movie	Sunny	
1999	The Manor	Charlotte Kleiner	
1999	Kimberly	Kimberly	
2000	If You Only Knew	Kate	
2000	The Guilty	Sophie Lennon	
2000	North Beach	Lu	
2001	Flying Virus	Ann Bauer	
2001	Turbulence 3: Heavy Metal	FBI Agent Kate Hayden	Direct-to-video
2003	Save It for Later	Catherine	
2006	9/Tenths	Jessica	
2006	The Marsh	Claire Holloway	
2006	Long Lost Son	Kristen Sheppard	
2006	Crazy Eights	Beth Patterson	
2008	iMurders	Lindsay Jefferies	
2011	A Warrior's Heart	Claire Sullivan	
2011	The Family Tree	Nina	
2019	The Last Summer	Griffin's Mom	

=== Television ===
Year	Title	Role	Notes
1988	The StoryTeller	Lidia	Episode: "Fearnot"
1988	First Born	Nell Forester	Episode 1.3
1989	Summer's Lease	Chrissie Kettering	Episodes: "A Battlefield" and "The Urbino Trail"
1989	Prince Caspian and the Voyage of the Dawn Treader	Princess	Episode 1.6
1990	Press Gang	Sam Black	Main role (series 2)
1992	Beverly Hills, 90210	Tricia Kinney	Episode: "Fire and Ice"
1993	Fallen Angels	Delia	Episode: "Dead End for Delia"
2001	The Practice	Katie Defoe	Episode: "Dangerous Liaisons"
2002	John Doe	Rachel Penbroke	Episodes: "Manifest Destiny", "Tone Dead"
2007	The Tudors	Princess Margaret	Recurring role (season 1), 6 episodes
2007–13	Burn Notice	Fiona Glenanne	Main role
2008	Law & Order: Special Victims Unit	Eva Sintzel	Episode: "Inconceivable"
2017–18	Once Upon a Time	Lady Rapunzel Tremaine / Victoria Belfrey	Main role (season 7)

==== TV films and miniseries ====
Year	Title	Role
1986	Hideaway	Tracy Wright
1991	The Mysteries of the Dark Jungle	Ada Corishant
1995	In Pursuit of Honor	Jessica Stewart
1997	The Ripper	Florry Lewis
1999	My Little Assassin	Marita Lorenz
2000	Without Malice	Susan
2000	How to Marry a Billionaire: A Christmas Tale	Jenny Seeger
2002	Sherlock: Case of Evil	Rebecca Doyle
2004	Try to Remember	Lisa Monroe
2005	Mysterious Island	Jane
2006	Long Lost Son	Kristen Sheppard / Halloran / Collins
2006	The Librarian: Return to King Solomon's Mines	Emily Davenport
2010	Lies Between Friends	Joss Jenner
2011	Carnal Innocence	Caroline Waverly

=== Music videos ===
- Pretty Little Head (1986), by Paul McCartney
- Into the Great Wide Open (1991), by Tom Petty and the Heartbreakers, as Eddie's girlfriend

== Awards and nominations ==
Award	Year	Category	Work	Result	Ref.
Saturn Award	2007	Best Supporting Actress on Television	The Librarian: Return to King Solomon's Mines	Nominated	
Gemini Award	2008	Best Performance by an Actress in a Guest Role in a Dramatic Series	The Tudors	Nominated	
Teen Choice Award	2010	Choice TV Actress: Action	Burn Notice	Nominated	
Teen Choice Award	2018	Choice TV: Villain	Once Upon a Time	Nominated	
