= In Pursuit of Honor =

1995 American film by Ken Olin

- Genre: Drama; Western
- Written by: Dennis Lynton Clark
- Directed by: Ken Olin
- Starring: Don Johnson; Craig Sheffer; Gabrielle Anwar; Bob Gunton; Rod Steiger
- Theme music composer: John Debney
- Country of origin: United States
- Original language: English

Production
- Executive producer: Jeffrey M. Hayes
- Producer: Anne Hopkins
- Production location: Australia
- Cinematography: Stephen F. Windon
- Editor: Elba Sanchez-Short
- Running time: 89 minutes (TV); 109 minutes (DVD)
- Production company: HBO Pictures

Original release
- Network: HBO
- Release: March 18, 1995

In Pursuit of Honor is a 1995 American made-for-cable Western film directed by Ken Olin. Don Johnson stars as a member of a United States Cavalry detachment refusing to slaughter its horses after being ordered to do so by General Douglas MacArthur. The movie follows the plight of the officers as they attempt to save the animals that the Army no longer needs as it modernizes toward a mechanized military. The movie claims to be based on a true story but without firm evidence to support the claim.

== Plot ==
The film opens in 1932 during an historical event, known as the Bonus March. World War I veterans are protesting and rallying in Washington, D.C., demanding immediate cash redemption of bonus certificates that were due to be paid in 1945. Troops from the U.S. Cavalry and Infantry are present for crowd control. Major John Hardesty, orders the mounted cavalry to present their sabers, in order to hold back the protesters. First Sergeant or "Top" John Libbey and three fellow soldiers refuse to draw their swords because the demonstrators are men with whom they served during the war. As a consequence, their military careers are tarnished and they are relegated to duty at a remote post in Texas.

Two years later, young Lieutenant Marshall Buxton arrives at his new post. During his interview with retiring Colonel Stuart, it is revealed that he has been assigned to this post because he attacked another soldier for hurting his horse. Many other men are there because of insubordination. Lieutenant Buxton meets Sergeants Libbey, Quinlain, Mulcahey, and Shattuck, who together manage the herd of remounts.

Commanding officer Colonel Stuart is replaced by Colonel Hardesty (on Hardesty's promotion). Hardesty's mission is to aid the transition to a mechanized army. To accomplish this, the horses at the outpost will have to be destroyed. When Buxton is ordered to take the herd to be killed, he tries to tell Colonel Hardesty that he cannot have that on his conscience. Hardesty refuses to change his mind, telling Buxton that he will do as ordered or face a court-martial. While watching the first 100 helpless horses being shot in a mass grave, Lieutenant Buxton decides to end the massacre and drive the remaining herd to safety. The other sergeants agree to help him.

A manhunt ensues that forces the renegade men and horses north. Along the way, the men get a little help from the retired Colonel Stuart, who is in good standing with the U.S. War Department, and from Stuart's daughter, Jessica, who is a journalist. Many of the horses are lost during the journey, due to exhaustion and injuries, but Buxton is still determined to save the ones that are left. The original plan is to take the horses to the Indian Reservation in Montana, where they will be safe, but because of Hardesty's Armored Division they are forced to go north to Canada. When they cross the border, the Americans cannot follow.

When they reach the Canada–US border, they make a final run with the herd. Jessica brings a letter from President Franklin D. Roosevelt, granting them pardons, but they are already being fired on by light artillery. None of the shells hit them, because the Gunnery Sergeant, who does not believe in shooting American soldiers, "accidentally" set the range incorrectly. Buxton's men and the remaining horses make it across the river and are met by the Royal Canadian Mounted Police, who are on their side. Lieutenant Buxton decides to return to the United States to face charges, hoping to do something in court to stop this kind of thing from happening again, Sergeant Libbey decides to head further north, to Alaska, and the others decide to stay in Canada.

== Cast ==
- Don Johnson as Sergeant John Libbey
- Craig Sheffer as Lieutenant Marshall Buxton
- Gabrielle Anwar as Jessica Stewart
- Robert Gunton as Colonel John Hardesty
- James Sikking as General Douglas MacArthur
- John Dennis Johnston as Sergeant Thomas Mulcahey
- Robert Coleby as Sergeant James Shattuck
- Neil Melville as Sergeant Sean Quinlain
- Rod Steiger as Colonel Owen Stewart
- Justin Monjo as Captain Geoffrey Overton
- Peter Curtin as Sergeant Ernest Gruber

== Production ==
The film was shot in Australia.

== Accuracy ==
While the film depicts the US Army eliminating its horse cavalry units in 1934 by destroying all its horses, research conducted at the U.S. Army Center of Military History and the records at the MacArthur Memorial show no record of a slaughter of horses as alleged in the film, or any order or plan for such destruction.

In reality, the US Army and various states' National Guard units retained horse cavalry units into the 1940s. Several US Army units, including the 26th Cavalry Regiment of the Philippine Scouts, the 5,307th Composite Unit (Provisional) ["Merrill's Marauders"], and portions of the 3rd Infantry Division and 10th Mountain Division used horses and mules for transportation for men and equipment during the Second World War, even riding into combat, in some instances. US Army occupation troops in Germany included a mounted platoon.

The US Cavalry School continued training horses and riders until 1946, when it was deactivated. When the Army's Remount Service ended, its horses and programs were transferred to the Department of Agriculture, which sold the horses at auction the following year.

Slaughter of feral horses by ranchers in the intermountain region was not uncommon in the 1960s. Many horsemen in this region wear Stetsons in the "Montana Peak" style which resembles the "Campaign Hat" of the old cavalry units. This might have contributed to the belief that the Army was slaughtering the horses. In his 1992 painting Save the Wild Horses, created for a Smithsonian fundraiser, Stockton Master Artist Jack Feldman depicted the mustangs, rounded up, their eyes glowing red, illuminated by spotlights, in a nighttime mass slaughter.

== See also ==
- List of films about horses
