= Alvin Malnik =

American businessman and attorney (born 1933)

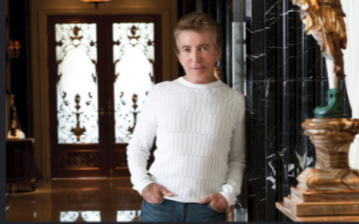
- Born: May 23, 1933 (age 92); St. Louis, Missouri
- Occupations: Businessman, attorney
- Known for: Co-founder of The Forge restaurant
- Children: 10
- Relatives: Gabrielle Anwar (daughter-in-law)

Alvin Ira Malnik (born May 23, 1933) is an American businessman and attorney.

== Biography ==
Malnik was born May 23, 1933, to a working-class family in St. Louis, Missouri, the son of Russian-Jewish immigrants. He attended Clark Elementary School in childhood and graduated from Soldan High School in 1950.

He received his Bachelor of Arts degree from Washington University in St. Louis in 1954. He was in the U.S. Army Reserve from 1954 to 1956 as a Guided Missile Officer and earned the rank of Captain.

He received his LLB and J.D. degrees from the University of Miami School of Law in 1959 and joined the Florida Bar. He actively practiced law until the late 1960s, and has since been engaged in real estate development and finance.

Early in his career, Malnik bought and sold the rights to the movie-machine, Scopitone. He earned $2 million from this business deal, which introduced him to the entertainment world. He then developed long-lasting business and personal relationships with celebrities including Frank Sinatra and Dean Martin.

Malnik is a founder of such institutions as the University of Miami/Sylvester Comprehensive Cancer Center and Mount Sinai Medical Center and is a sponsor of the Founders Society of the University of Miami, as well as the Al & Nancy Malnik Family AML Research Fund. He has received several honors from the Dana Farber Cancer Institute, Miami Beach Chamber of Commerce, Jay Weiss Research Center at the University of Miami, School of Medicine, and the Make a Wish Foundation.

=== The Forge ===
Malnik and his friend Jay Weiss purchased and remodeled The Forge restaurant in Miami Beach in 1968. The Forge is the second oldest restaurant in South Florida, and is a recipient of the International Grand Master Wine Award.

=== Real estate projects ===
Under Malnik's guidance and sponsorship, such real estate projects were developed and built as Cricket Club Condominium buildings, Sky Lake Country Club, Brandsmart Building, California Club Residents, as well as multiple shopping centers in South Florida.

== Personal life ==
His first wife was Deborah "Debbie" Carol (née Froelich) Malnik Hopp with whom he had four children before their divorce. In 1995, he married Nancy Gresham with whom he has six children. His son, Mark "Shareef" Malnik, is married to Gabrielle Anwar.

In a 2011 interview, filmmaker Brett Ratner stated that he "really didn't know" his biological father, and considers Malnik to be his father.
