= Long Lost Son =

- DVD cover
- Written by: Richard Blade
- Directed by: Brian Trenchard-Smith
- Starring: Gabrielle Anwar; Craig Sheffer; Chace Crawford
- Composer: David Reynolds
- Country of origin: United States
- Original language: English

Production
- Executive producer: J.J. Jamieson
- Producer: Sylvia Hess
- Cinematography: Robert Morris
- Editor: John Blizek
- Running time: 88 minutes
- Production companies: Regent Entertainment; Heartstone Pictures; Christopher Filmcapital
- Budget: $1.3 million

Original release
- Network: Lifetime
- Release: July 24, 2006

Long Lost Son is a 2006 American thriller television film directed by Brian Trenchard-Smith. It premiered on Lifetime on July 24, 2006.

== Production ==
Trenchard-Smith and producer Andreas Haas had previously made The Paradise Virus together, which had been successful and they reunited for this follow-up. The film was shot in 14 days on Grand Turk Island. Trenchard-Smith says Gabrielle Anwar rewrote much of her dialogue, which he thought improved the script.

The director later said the film was "not perfect":

A few things make me wince a little. Critics will probably mock it. It's my venture into Douglas Sirk emotional melodrama territory with a Caribbean flavor on a shoestring budget, but aided by a savvy music score from David Reynolds, his fourth for me. The music really helps a lot. But I am proud of the film; it delivers just what a particular audience wants. That's my job, genre by genre.
