= Diving horse =

Tourist attraction

External videos
- Diving Horses
- A 1923 video record of a horse diving from a 60 ft platform at the USA.
- A mid-1960s 8mm film of two mules diving from a platform.

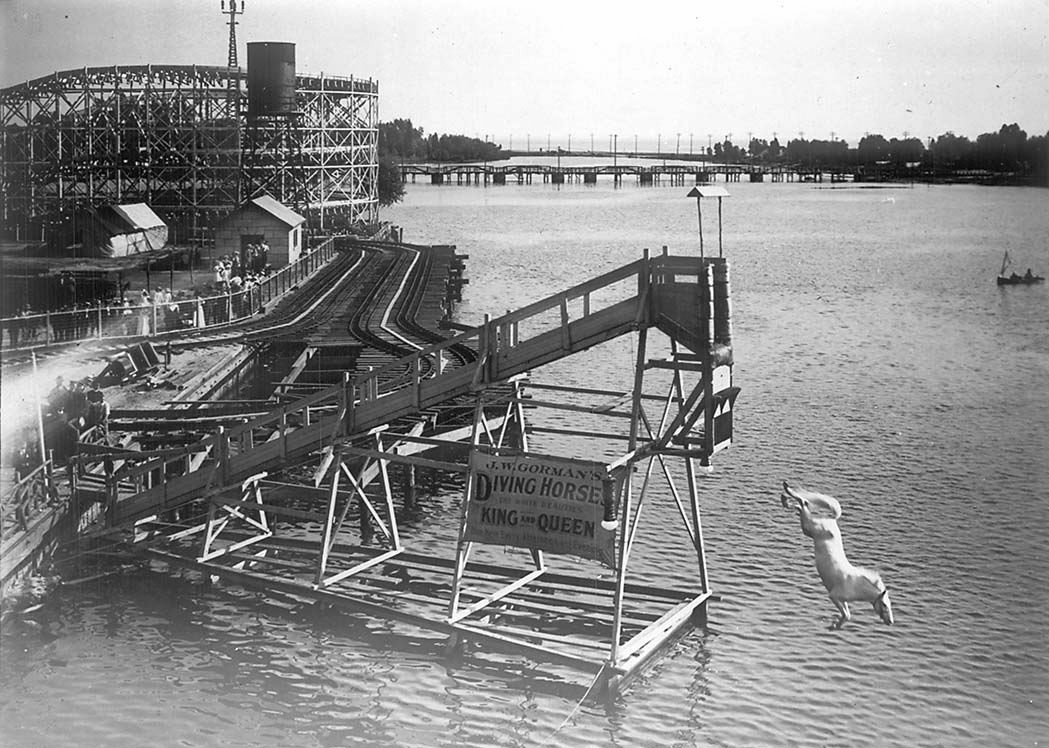
The diving horse at the Hanlan's Point Amusement Park, Toronto, Ontario, Canada, around 1907

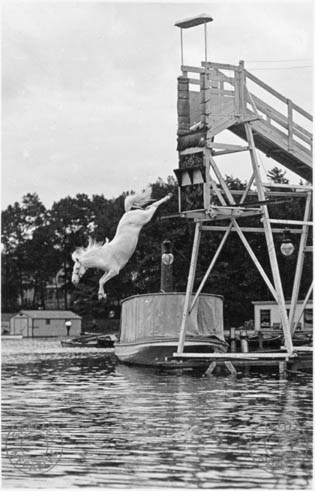
A diving horse in Toronto

A diving horse is an attraction that was popular in North America from the mid-1880s till the mid-20th century and occasionally thereafter, in which a horse would be dropped headfirst into a pool of water, sometimes from as high as 60 feet.

== History ==
William "Doc" Carver "invented" horse-diving exhibitions. Allegedly, in 1881 Carver was crossing a bridge over Platte River (Nebraska) when it partially collapsed. His horse fell in divelike manner into the waters below, inspiring Carver to develop the diving horse act. He trained various animals and went on tour. His son, Al Floyd Carver, constructed the ramp and tower, and Lorena Carver was the first rider. Sonora Webster joined the show in 1924 and later married Al Floyd Carver. The show became a permanent fixture at Atlantic City's popular venue Steel Pier. There, Sonora, Al and Lorena continued the show following his death.

In 1931, Sonora and her horse Red Lips lost their balance on the platform. Sonora survived the fall, but was permanently blinded by detached retinas in both eyes as a result of keeping her eyes open. She continued horse-diving until 1942 and later wrote a memoir, published as A Girl and Five Brave Horses. A film loosely based on her life, Wild Hearts Can't Be Broken, was released in 1991.

In Lake George, New York, the Magic Forest theme park hosted a diving horse feature beginning in 1977, originally featuring a horse named Rex, later replaced by a gelding named Lightning. The manager stated, "There is no rider, no prods, no electrical jolts, and no trap doors." The theme park was purchased in 2018 and re-opened as Lake George Expedition Park, without horse diving.

== Animal welfare ==
A horse-diving show was an in-residence act held at New Jersey's Steel Pier. Pressure from animal-rights activists and declining demand led to the act being shuttered in the 1970s. Although there was a brief resumption of the act at the pier in 1993, it was again shut down amid opposition. The horses sometimes dived four times a day, seven days a week. An attempt in 2012 to revive the shows at Steel Pier was halted when animal-welfare advocates petitioned the owners not to hold the shows. Wayne Pacelle, then president of the Humane Society of the United States stated: "This is a merciful end to a colossally stupid idea."

== Loading of the pier ==
Atlantic City's Steel Pier was also used to mount a measuring device (tide gauge) to monitor changes in the sea level of the Atlantic Ocean. However, changes in sea level at the pier turned out to have been caused by the weight of the crowds gathered to watch the diving horses. Measurements from 1929 to 1978 indicated sea level rise – when the crowds were regular and caused the pier to settle slightly in the soft, sandy bottom – except during the horse-jumping hiatus from 1945 to 1953 when the lack of regular crowds allowed the pier to rise slightly.

== See also ==
- "Saddlesore Galactica" – an episode of The Simpsons involving a diving horse
