= A Girl and Five Brave Horses =

Memoir by Sonora Webster Carver

- First edition
- Author: Sonora Webster Carver
- Language: English
- Genre: Autobiography
- Published: Doubleday
- Publication place: United States
- Media type: Print (Hardcover and paperback)
- Pages: 224 pp (hardcover)
- Dewey Decimal: 791.3/2 22
- LC Class: GV1831.H8 C3 2009

A Girl and Five Brave Horses is a memoir by Sonora Webster Carver published in 1961.

At the age of 20, Sonora Webster Carver joined William Frank Carver's Wild West Show, which featured diving horses and performed at Atlantic City's Steel Pier. Although Carver was blinded in a diving accident seven years later, she continued to dive afterward. She wrote A Girl and Five Brave Horses documenting her life and her memories of diving horses.

== Legacy ==
It inspired the Walt Disney Pictures film Wild Hearts Can't Be Broken.
