= Steel Pier =

Pier and amusement park in New Jersey

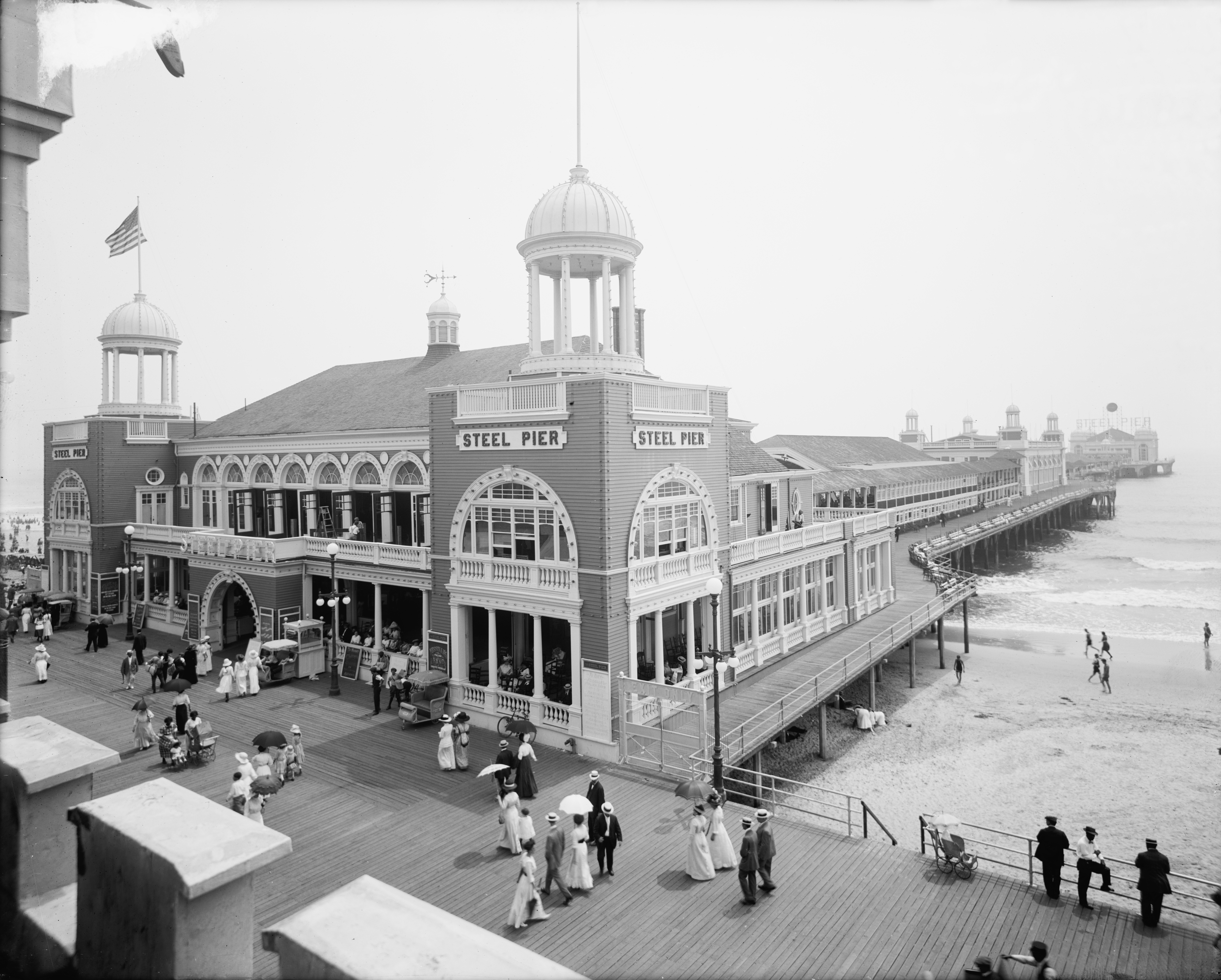
- Steel Pier c. 1915
- Interactive map of Steel Pier
- Location: 1000 Boardwalk, Atlantic City, New Jersey, U.S.
- Coordinates: 39.3575°N 74.4190°W
- Status: Operating
- Opened: June 18, 1898
- Owner: Steel Pier Associates, LLC
- Operating season: April through October (Observation Wheel open March–December)

Attractions
- Total: 23
- Roller coasters: 2
- Water rides: 0
- Website: steelpier.com

The Steel Pier is a 1,000-foot-long (300 m) amusement park built on a pier of the boardwalk in Atlantic City, New Jersey, across from the Hard Rock Hotel & Casino Atlantic City (formerly the Trump Taj Mahal). Built in 1897 and opened in 1898, it was one of the most popular venues in the United States for the first seven decades of the twentieth century, featuring concerts, exhibits, and an amusement park. It billed itself as the Showplace of the Nation and at its peak measured 2,298 feet (700 m).

The pier is owned by the Catanoso family and operates under the Steel Pier Associates, LLC name. The Catanosos had previously leased the pier to operate the amusement park before they purchased it. The Steel Pier continues to operate as an amusement pier and is one of the most successful family-oriented attractions in the city. The pier has twenty-four rides, a helicopter station, an arcade, food stands, and more. The pier was connected to the former Trump Taj Mahal through an overhead walking bridge.

== History ==
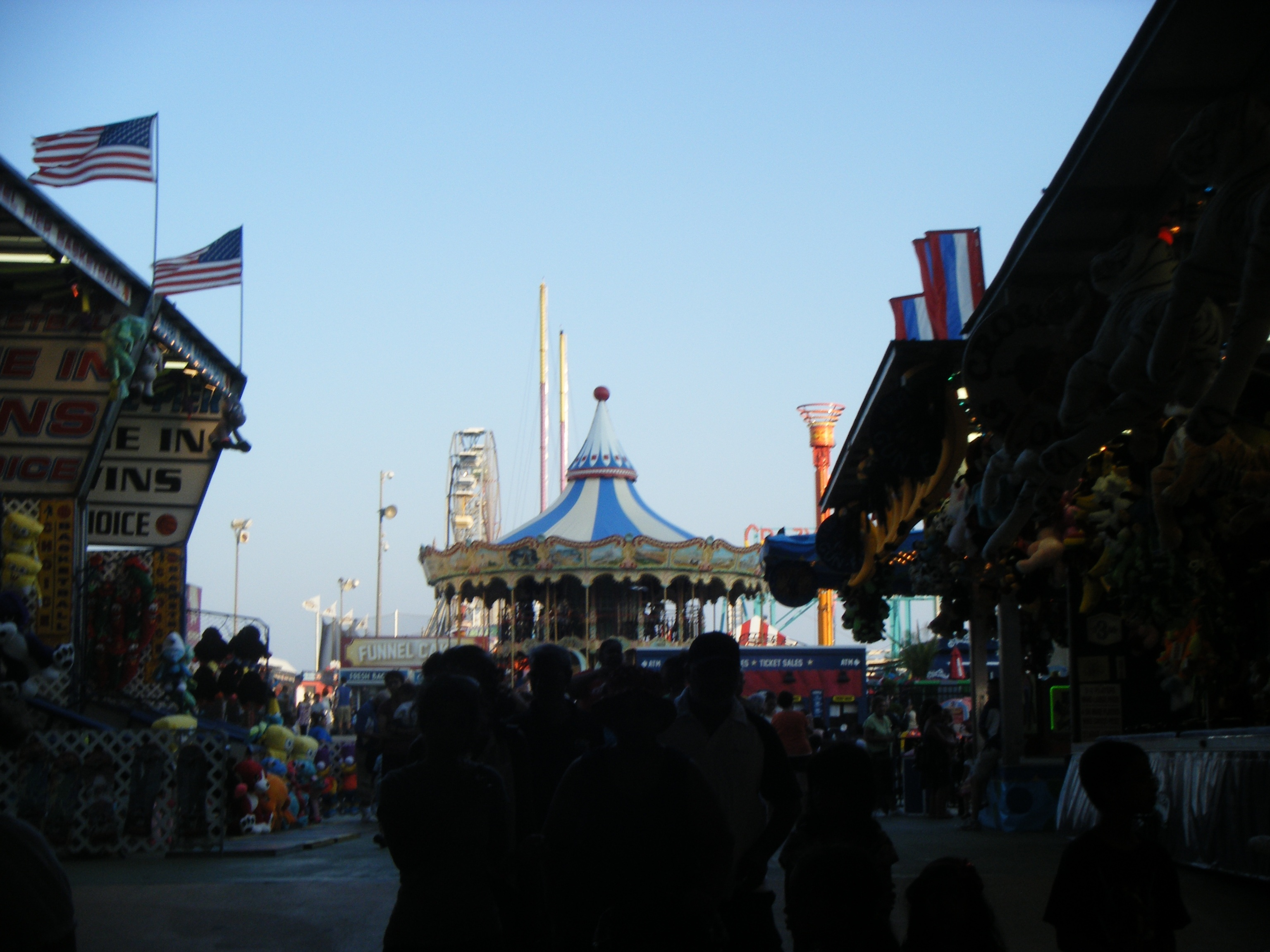
Steel Pier in 2012

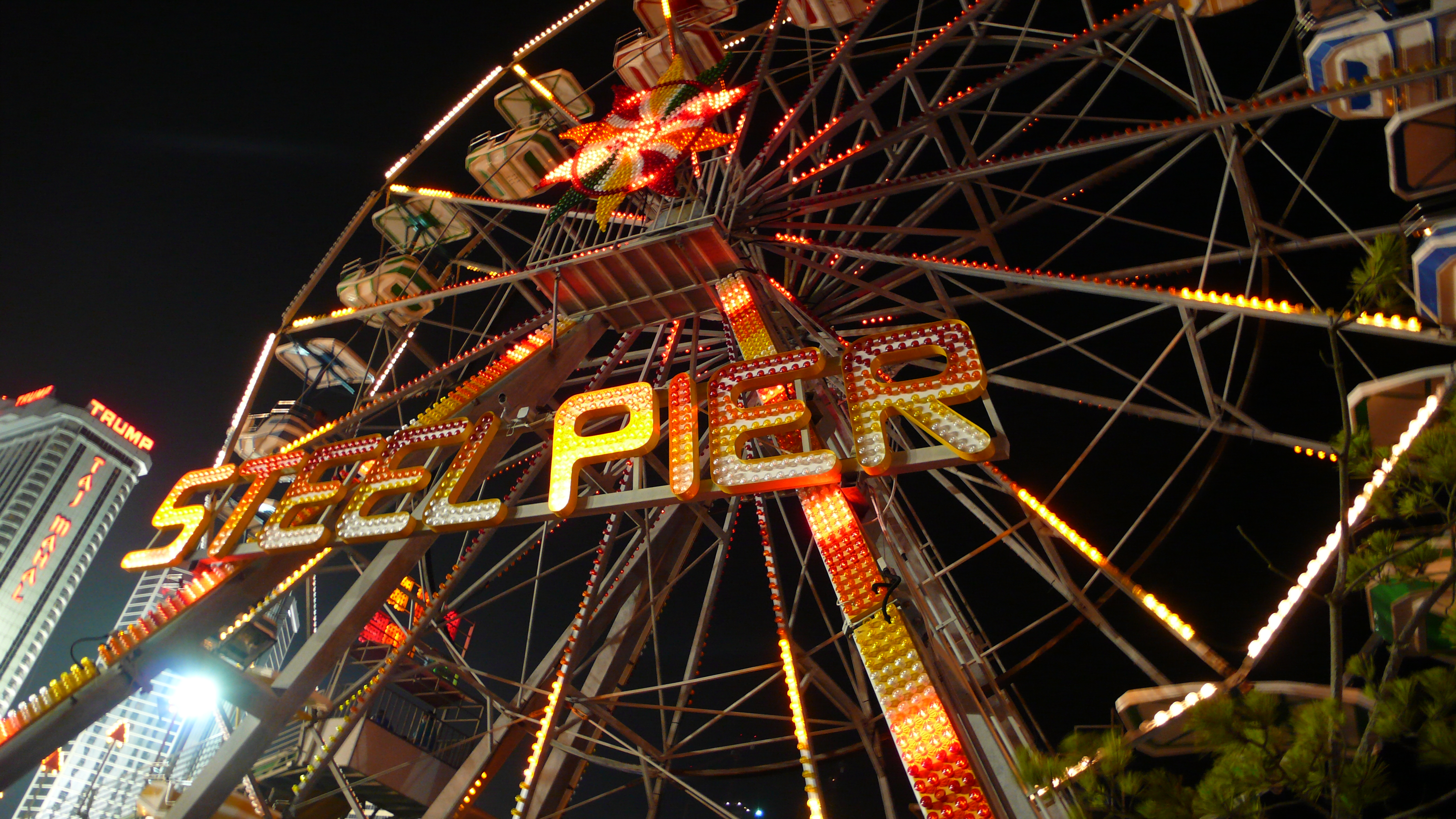
Steel Pier Ferris wheel in Atlantic City with Trump Taj Mahal in background in 2009

The pier was built by the Steel Pier Company and opened on June 18, 1898. It was built on iron pilings, using a concrete understructure with steel girders. In 1904, a storm washed away part of Steel Pier, and many engineers stated that it could not be rebuilt. Atlantic City's future mayor, Edward L. Bader, and his company accepted the challenge to rebuild it. His success with that job led to more work for him in Atlantic City. The Steel Pier Theatre provided a variety of theatre and entertainment offerings from 1898 until closing in 1979. It was destroyed by fire in 1982.

For the first half of the 1922–23 season in the Eastern Basketball League, the Atlantic City basketball team there that was originally known as the Atlantic City Sandpipers before becoming the Atlantic City Celtics (via the Original Celtics briefly taking over for them) would play their home game at the Steel Pier before officially leaving the EBL that season due to an ultimatum the EBL had at hand with the Atlantic City franchise.

In 1924, a fire caused significant damage to the pier. Frank Gravatt purchased the pier the following year and renovated it. He was called the "salt water Barnum" by the local newspaper. The restored pier hosted dance bands, three movie theaters, exhibits, operas, children's shows, a water circus, stunts, and other attractions. Gravatt signed John Philip Sousa for a series of annual concerts. The General Motors Exhibit opened in 1926 and continued through 1933, when it was replaced by Ford. (General Motors returned in 1947 and continued until 1968.) From 1935 through 1938, the Steel Pier was where Miss America was crowned. It was described as "An Amusement City at Sea" and "A Vacation in Itself". It also was once called the "Showplace of the Nation" and included such acts as the High Diving horse; Rex the Wonder Dog, the Human Cannonball, a water-skiing canine in the 1930s; the diving bell; and musicians, including Frank Sinatra and Al Jolson, among others. Diana Ross and The Supremes played week-long engagements during the summer in 1965, 1966, and 1967, to sold-out business in the Steel Pier's Music Hall Theater and the Marine Ballroom. "Rain or Shine ... There's Always a Good Show on Steel Pier" was another phrase used to describe the venue's varied entertainment.

In 1945, the pier was purchased by George Hamid, who operated the competing Million Dollar Pier. He brought popular and rock and roll music to the pier, starting with Bill Haley and the Comets in 1955. Parts of the pier were damaged or lost during the Ash Wednesday Storm of 1962. The Beatles were booked in 1964, but overwhelming demand for tickets forced them to move to Boardwalk Hall. The pier used to be much longer, but a December 1969 fire six months before the opening of the 1970 season shortened it by about a third.

By the end of the 1960s, the pier was feeling the effects of declining tourism in Atlantic City. The pier was sold to a group of local businessmen in 1973. After gambling was legalized, a developer proposed turning the pier into a hotel-casino, but the necessary governmental approvals could not be obtained. The pier was then sold to Resorts International in 1978 for $3.8 million. From the 1979 season onward, most of the pier was closed due to its deteriorating condition; only the Boardwalk-fronting area with vendors and an arcade remained open. Resorts mainly used the rest of pier for storage. In 1982, an arson fire heavily damaged the pier, destroying about a third of it. Reconstruction of the pier began in 1985.

A heliport was opened at the end of the pier in 1982 to transport high rollers to the Resorts casino. The fire later that year left the heliport undamaged but inaccessible, until a new walkway was built to reach it. Starting in 1984, Resorts International Airline offered commercial helicopter service between Steel Pier and New York City. As reconstruction got underway in 1985, the heliport was moved to the nearby Steeplechase Pier.

Donald Trump took ownership of the pier in 1988 as part of his acquisition of the Taj Mahal casino hotel from Resorts. The reconstructed Trump Steel Pier opened in 1992, but had been reduced to about 1,000 ft (300 m) and featured mainly amusement rides. The Steel Pier continues to operate as an amusement park to this day. When Trump acquired the pier, he connected it to his main casino and built a hub for tram car rides.

In 2006, the pier closed and its rides were removed, as Trump Entertainment planned to redevelop the pier as condominiums. It reopened the following season, however, and the redevelopment plans were eventually abandoned due to lack of funding.

In June 2008, the Steel Pier celebrated its 110th anniversary, having originally opened on Saturday, June 18, 1898. All rides were free that day from midnight on June 18 to midnight on June 19.

In 2011, Trump Entertainment sold the pier for $4.3 million to a group led by the Catanoso family, the operators of the pier since 1993. The Catanosos undertook a multi-year renovation of the pier, starting in 2012. The plans initially included the return of the diving horse act, but that was soon scrapped due to criticism over animal rights. Twelve new rides were added, including a Booster, a frisbee ride, and a slingshot. The renovation culminated in 2017 with the opening of a 227-foot (69 m) observation wheel.

== Tickets ==
Tickets for the Steel Pier cost $2.00 each. A book of 50 tickets with coupons is $65.00, amounting to a $35 discount. A book of 80 tickets with coupons is available as well for $85.00, amounting to $75 in savings. There are also special days of the weeks with deals associated with them, such as Two Ticket Thursdays and Two Ticket Tuesdays, which will begin on Tuesday, June 18, 2024 and Thursday, June 20th 2024. There will also be Family Fun Fridays, starting on Friday, June 21, 2024, where families can purchase a $45 unlimited ride wristband. A 10% military discount can also be received.

== Rides ==
The entire Steel Pier complex contains twenty-four rides.

=== Light rides (designed for kids 0–13) ===
Ride Name	Height (with adult)	Height (unaccompanied)	Tickets
Balloon Wheel	Height not required	36 inches	4
Beach Buggies	32 inches	36 inches	4
Carousel	Height not required	42 inches	4
Dodge'm	42 inches minimum	59 inches maximum	4
Kite Flyer	36 inches	42 inches	4
Flying Ace	Height not required	36 inches	4
Mighty Stampede	Height not required	36 inches	4
Pirate Voyage	Height not required	38 inches	4
Silly Steamer	Height not required	36 inches	4
Sugar ~ Sugar	36 inches	42 inches	4

=== Medium rides (designed for kids 9–17) ===
Ride Name	Height (with adult)	Height (unaccompanied)	Tickets
Surf's Up!	47 inches	51 inches	6
Flying Dutchman	48 inches	54 inches, maximum 75 inches	6
Rock and Roll	48 inches	48 inches	6
Swing Carousel	38 inches to ride with an adult in the same seat	44 inches	6
Twist n' Shout	36 inches	42 inches	6
Locomotion	42 inches	48 inches	6
Demo Derby	42 inches	50 inches	6
Diving Horse	Height not required	47 inches	8

=== Heavy rides (designed for kids 10–18) ===
Ride Name	Height (with adult)	Height (unaccompanied)	Tickets
Freedom Flyer	48 inches	56 inches	7
Crazy Crab	48 inches	54 inches	8
MIX	52 minimum	76 maximum	8
Tropical Storm	48 inches	55 inches	8

=== Special rides (special pricing) ===
Ride Name	Height	Weight	Tickets
Slingshot	48 minimum	150 lbs maximum	View
Helicopter Rides	N/A	N/A	View
The Wheel	56 inches unaccompanied	N/A	View

== In popular culture ==
=== In films ===
- Wild Hearts Can't Be Broken (1991) – a Walt Disney film about the life of one of the riders of the diving horses
- Convention Girl (1935) – featuring Shemp Howard of the Three Stooges, partly filmed on the Steel Pier
- Three Stooges at Steel Pier (1938) – mini-short in rare color of the Three Stooges
- The Burglar (1957) – featuring Jayne Mansfield, partly filmed on the Steel Pier
- Atlantic City (1980 film) – featuring Burt Lancaster and Susan Sarandon; shows the Steel Pier in the background in one scene.

=== In music ===
"Steel Pier" – sung by Bobby Rydell on a 1963 promotional single

"Amusement Parks U.S.A." – sung by the Beach Boys, references the Steel Pier, along with many other American amusement parks.

=== In theater ===
Steel Pier musical (1997) – set at Steel Pier during the 1930s. The plot centers on a dance marathon; however, dance marathons were featured instead at the Million Dollar Pier, not the Steel Pier.

== See also ==
- A Girl and Five Brave Horses
- Diving horse
- Sonora Webster Carver
- William Frank Carver

== Bibliography ==
- Leibowitz. Steel (2009). Steel Pier, Atlantic City: Showplace of the Nation. West Creek, NJ: Down the Shore Publishing. ISBN 9781593220365.
