= The Forge (restaurant) =

Coordinates: 25.813684°N 80.128469°W

- Interactive map of The Forge

Restaurant information
- Location: Miami, Florida, United States

The Forge was a nightclub and restaurant on Arthur Godfrey Road in the city of Miami Beach, Florida. Opened in the 1920s, it was purchased and remodeled in the late 1960s by Alvin Malnik. It was a hangout for both celebrities and organized crime figures.

In 1977, Meyer Lansky's stepson, Richard Schwartz, was charged with the murder of his drinking companion, Craig Teriaca, in the bar at The Forge. The shooting reportedly occurred after the two argued over a $10 bill. Schwartz was killed a few months later in what police assumed to be a revenge killing. A lawsuit by Teriaca's widow against The Forge, alleging that the restaurant had provided inadequate security, ended in a mistrial in 1980.

A fire closed the restaurant for three months in 1991. The following year, the restaurant's extensive wine collection was severely damaged in Hurricane Andrew; this led to an extended legal battle between the restaurant and its insurers over the value of the collection, eventually settled in 1997 by a $2.75 million payment.

Al Malnik's son Shareef Malnik owns and controls The Forge building; it remained a location for Miami night life until its closure. The restaurant closed in 2009 for a year-long renovation, and reopened in 2010 with a redesigned interior by Francois Frossard. It closed again in 2019, and has remained permanently closed since, although there have been tentative plans to reopen.
