= Michael Schoeffling =

American former actor and model (born 1960)

- Born: Michael Earl Schoeffling; December 10, 1960 (age 65); Wilkes-Barre, Pennsylvania, U.S.
- Occupation: Actor
- Years active: 1984–1991
- Notable work: Sixteen Candles
- Spouse: Valerie Robinson (m. 1987)
- Children: 2

Michael Earl Schoeffling (born December 10, 1960) is an American former actor and model. He is known for playing the roles of Jake Ryan in Sixteen Candles, Kenny "Kuch" Kuchera in Vision Quest, Corey Burck in Let's Get Harry, Joe Perretti in Mermaids, and Al Carver in Wild Hearts Can't Be Broken.

He retired from acting in 1991.

== Early life and education ==
Schoeffling was born in Wilkes-Barre, Pennsylvania, and raised in South Jersey. He graduated from Cherokee High School in Evesham Township, New Jersey. He attended Temple University in Philadelphia, where he majored in liberal arts. In the mid-1980s he began modelling for GQ, and photographer Bruce Weber paid for his acting classes at the Lee Strasberg Theatre Institute in Manhattan.

== Acting career ==
Schoeffling came to international prominence at the age of 23 for his role as Jake Ryan, the popular yet sensitive high school athlete on whom Molly Ringwald's character has a crush in the teen film Sixteen Candles. For Valentine's Day in 2004, twenty years after the film's American premiere, The Washington Post published an article titled "Real Men Can't Hold a Match to Jake Ryan of Sixteen Candles", which discussed the character's enduring appeal.

He appeared in eight additional films after Sixteen Candles, including supporting roles in Vision Quest and Mermaids, and starring roles in the 1986 action film Let's Get Harry and 1991's Wild Hearts Can't Be Broken.

== Post-acting career ==
After his acting career, Schoeffling opened a woodworking shop and produced handcrafted furniture. Schoeffling has kept out of the public eye and has never given interviews since retiring from acting. In 2014, his wife told People that he "simply values his privacy".

== Personal life ==
Schoeffling met his wife, former actress and model, Valerie Robinson, on the modeling circuit in New York in the early 1980s, and married in 1987. They have two children: a son and a daughter.

== Filmography ==
Year	Title	Role	Notes
1984	Sixteen Candles	Jake Ryan	
1984	Racing with the Moon	Amputee Soldier	Uncredited
1985	Sylvester	Matt	
1985	Vision Quest	Kenny "Kuch" Kuchera	
1986	Let's Get Harry	Corey Burck	
1986	The Hitchhiker	Lance	TV series (episode: "Dead Man's Curve")
1986	Belizaire the Cajun	Hypolite Leger	
1989	Longtime Companion	Michael	
1989	Slaves of New York	Jan	
1990	Mermaids	Joe Perretti	
1991	Wild Hearts Can't Be Broken	Al Carver	
