= Wild Hearts Can't Be Broken =

1991 film by Steve Miner

- Theatrical release poster
- Directed by: Steve Miner
- Written by: Matt Williams; Oley Sassone
- Based on: A Girl and Five Brave Horses by Sonora Webster Carver
- Produced by: Matt Williams
- Starring: Gabrielle Anwar; Michael Schoeffling; Cliff Robertson
- Cinematography: Daryn Okada
- Edited by: Jon Poll
- Music by: Mason Daring
- Production company: Walt Disney Pictures
- Distributed by: Buena Vista Pictures Distribution
- Release date: May 24, 1991
- Running time: 88 minutes
- Country: United States
- Language: English
- Box office: $7.3 million

Wild Hearts Can't Be Broken is a 1991 American drama film directed by Steve Miner. It concerns Sonora Webster Carver, a rider of diving horses. Gabrielle Anwar stars as Carver alongside Michael Schoeffling and Cliff Robertson. It is based on events in her life as told in her memoir A Girl and Five Brave Horses.

== Plot ==
In 1932, Sonora Webster lives with her sister, Arnette, and abusive Aunt Helen during the Great Depression. Sonora admires a magazine clipping of a beautiful girl in Atlantic City. Aspiring to be like her, she cuts off her waist length hair, causing her Aunt to make her wear a bag on her head. After a series of troubles, which involve her accidentally letting the cows loose, punching another girl for making fun of her (she was the one who instigated the accident that let the cows out), and getting suspended from school, Aunt Helen sells her treasured horse, Lightning. Helen then tells Sonora that she will be sent to an orphanage the following day. Instead, having found an ad in a newspaper earlier that day for a diving horse girl, Sonora slips out of the house during the night to follow her dreams. She travels to the county fair and sees a performance by Marie, a diving girl who rides a horse off a platform, and aspires to do so, too. Marie's employer, Doc Carver, tells her she is too young but gives her a job as a stable hand due to her ability with horses, and she begins traveling with them. Doc's son, Al, wins a wild horse in a card game and Sonora names him Lightning. She later surprises Doc by taming and riding him, so he promises to train her to be a diving girl if she can mount it while it's moving, which she succeeds after multiple attempts. This causes a huge fight between Al and Dr. Carver as Al says he pushed her too hard. Al leaves and promises to write Sonora.

Marie, while watching Sonora ride, gets on to show her how to properly do so. Sonora warns Marie not to kick him, but she ignores her and Lightning rears causing her to fall off and dislocate her shoulder. With her unable to perform, Dr. Carver asks Sonora to step in and make her first dive. Although she has never dived with Lightning, their first jump is successful. Marie becomes jealous of the act, and as Doc tires of her diva-like behavior, she quits rather than share billing with Sonora. During the months that follow, Al writes to Sonora as she continues to make successful dives on Lightning but Doc hides all his letters and she thinks that he has forgotten about her. When Doc and the new stable hand, Clifford, are away from the farm in search of jobs for the show, Lightning falls ill with colic. Al returns, and he and Sonora work together and Lightning pulls through. Doc has not found any places for them to perform, but then, Al announces he has arranged a six-month contract to do so at the Steel Pier in Atlantic City, New Jersey, as he knew this was always Sonora’s dream. This reconciles Doc and Al, but the former passes away of a heart attack on the way to Atlantic City, and Al assumes Doc's role as the show presenter. Sonora searches for Doc's jacket to give Al confidence on his first show, and finds one of his letters in it that confesses his love for her, and she lets him know that she feels the same.

Al proposes to Sonora just before a performance in front of their biggest crowd, which she accepts. As Lightning is still recovering from colic, Sonora is forced to make the dive on Red Lips, Marie’s former mount. The horse is jittery unlike Lightning, who has become a steady performer, and he falters and trips off the end of the diving board after shying from cymbals crashing below. Not expecting it, Sonora has her eyes open as they land in the pool. Both are alive, and Sonora has issues with her vision, but it quickly clears. However, she hides this from Al, not wanting him to stop her from doing the shows. She wakes the next morning to discover she is permanently blind from detached retinas in both eyes. She has to learn to find her way around, and Al is always by her side to help her. To avoid a breach of contract lawsuit, he must find another diving girl within a week, so he calls Marie, who returns. Meanwhile, Sonora misses diving terribly, especially as she has to stay home while she knows Al and Marie are out performing. She tells Al of her desire to dive with Lightning again, and they work together to try to train her to mount him blind, but it proves fruitless and Al gives up.

The next day, Clifford locks Marie in her dressing room, and Sonora performs in her place with Lightning. Al shouts at her to come back down, but she continues, and the jump is successful. Her voiceover states that she continued diving for eleven more years, with the audience never learning of her blindness, and that she and Al were happily married.

== Cast ==
- Gabrielle Anwar as Sonora Webster
- Michael Schoeffling as Al Carver
- Kathleen York as Marie
- Dylan Kussman as Clifford
- Cliff Robertson as Doc Carver
- Frank Renzulli as Mr. Slater
- Nancy Moore Atchison as Arnette Webster
- Lisa Norman as Aunt Helen
- Lorianne Collins as Clarabelle
- Elizabeth Hayes as Miss Simpson
- Laura Lee Norton as Mrs. Ellis
- Michael J. Matusiak as Photographer
- Jeff Woodward as Reporter #1
- David Massry as Reporter #2
- Cheri Brown as Attractive Girl
- David Dwyer as Stagehand
- Haley Aull as Little Girl
- Ed Grady as Preacher
- Katy Matson as Kid #1
- Wendy Ball as Kid #2
- Sam Aull as Kid #3
- Carson Aull as Kid #4
- Boyd Peterson as Farmer #1
- Gene Walker as Farmer #2
- Lowell D. Smith as Wrangler
- Rick Warner as Doctor
- Mark Jeffrey Miller as Candy Man
- Tim Carter as Cymbal Player
- Emily Maher as Extra #1

== Reception ==
The film holds a 73% rating on Rotten Tomatoes from 11 reviews, with an average rating of 6.5/10.

Stephen Holden gave the film a positive review in The New York Times, praising Anwar and Robertson's performances and the script for not succumbing to sentimentality. He wrote, "The film's most touching moments evoke the wordless understanding that develops between [Robertson's] demanding taskmaster and his equally strong-willed student."

Upon the film's release, Sonora Webster Carver and her sister, Arnette French, watched it together. Sonora was dissatisfied with its embellishments and felt that it bore little resemblance to her life. She told Arnette that "the only thing true in it was that I rode diving horses, I went blind, and I continued to ride for another 11 years." Arnette said that the movie "made a big deal about having the courage to go on riding after she lost her sight. But the truth was that riding the horse was the most fun you could have and we just loved it so."

== See also ==
- List of films about horses
