= Army Man (magazine) =

Humor magazine

- Army Man #1, as it appeared in the September 2004 issue of The Believer.
- Editor: George Meyer
- Categories: Humor magazine
- Frequency: Semi-regularly
- Founded: 1988
- Final issue Number: 1990; 3
- Country: United States
- Based in: Boulder, Colorado
- Language: English

Army Man (tagline: "America's Only Magazine") was a comedy magazine published in the late 1980s by George Meyer, who went on to be a writer for The Simpsons.

The magazine consisted mostly of very short and surreal jokes, along with cartoons. Each issue also featured Jack Handey's "Deep Thoughts", as well as other pieces written by him.

== History ==
Although Army Man was never widely distributed, it garnered a lot of attention in the comedy world. Two of its writers (John Swartzwelder and Jon Vitti) were picked up alongside Meyer to be part of the original writing staff of The Simpsons by the show's developer and show-runner Sam Simon, a fan of the magazine. Other Army Man writers would go on to write for The Simpsons in later seasons, including Jeff Martin, David Sacks, Ian Maxtone-Graham, Tom Gammill, Max Pross, Kevin Curran and Billy Kimball.

Other notable contributors of the magazine included Mark O'Donnell, Andy Borowitz, Andy Breckman, Roz Chast, Spike Feresten (credited as Mike Feresten), Ian Frazier, Ann Hodgman, Mitchell Kriegman, Merrill Markoe, Patricia Marx, Bob Odenkirk and David Owen. The writers were usually people Meyer knew from his years at the Harvard Lampoon or who worked with him in TV shows like Late Night with David Letterman, The New Show, Not Necessarily The News and Saturday Night Live.

Only three issues were ever published. The first issue was reprinted and included in the September 2004 issue of The Believer, which also featured interviews with Meyer, O'Donnell, Handey, Breckman and Frazier.

== Excerpts ==
A "LAKELY" STORY: My friend from Michigan says if you pushed all the Great Lakes together they’d be as big as the Mediterranean. I say, why bother?

BRIDE: (QUIETLY, TEARFUL) Ladies and gentlemen ... I'm afraid there won't be a wedding after all. Because, you see ... my fiancé has ... has died.
HECKLER FROM BACK PEW: Louder!
BRIDE: (LOUDER, ALMOST HYSTERICAL) My fiancé has died!
ANOTHER HECKLER: Funnier!

PET PEEVE: If there is one thing that really honks me off, it's the hopelessness and futility of the human condition

NEEDED: What this country needs is a good five-cent sports car (referencing a famous quote by former Vice President of the United States Thomas R. Marshall who allegedly remarked "What this country needs is a really good five-cent cigar.").
