= Ian Maxtone-Graham =

American television writer and producer

- Occupations: Television writer, producer
- Writing career
- Period: 1983–present

Ian Maxtone-Graham is an American television writer and producer. He has formerly written for Saturday Night Live (1992–1995) and The Simpsons (1995–2012), as well as serving as a co-executive producer and consulting producer for the latter from its seventh to its twenty-fourth seasons.

== Early years ==
Maxtone-Graham is the son of maritime historian John Maxtone-Graham. He is the great-nephew of Jan Struther, the writer of Mrs. Miniver. He attended Trinity School and Brown University. An enthusiastic swimmer, his first job after college was as a diver with an underwater research team. After struggling to establish a career in journalism, he penned material for the television show Not Necessarily the News and the magazines National Lampoon and Army Man. His work in Army Man, an offbeat magazine published by future Simpsons colleague George Meyer, brought him to the attention of Jack Handey, who suggested he work for Saturday Night Live.

== Saturday Night Live ==
While working for Saturday Night Live, Maxtone-Graham co-wrote "The Chanukah Song" with Adam Sandler and, according to the DVD commentary for the SNL clip show "The Best of Alec Baldwin", also wrote the controversial "Canteen Boy" sketch, in which Canteen Boy is sexually molested by his scoutmaster, Mr. Armstrong (played by episode host Alec Baldwin). According to the memoir of Jay Mohr, Maxtone-Graham threatened to quit and sue the show during the 1993–94 season after a fistfight with Norm Macdonald, although the lawsuit never came to fruition.

During all-night Saturday Night Live writing sessions, Sarah Silverman often stole underwear and socks from a cache of fresh clothes Maxtone-Graham kept in his office, and wore them in lieu of her own clothes.

== The Simpsons ==
Maxtone-Graham has become somewhat infamous among The Simpsons fans for a 1998 interview with The Independent, in which he admitted that he had "barely" seen The Simpsons before being hired, ridiculed "the beetle-browed people on the internet" for their criticism of the show, and dismissed women as being unsuitable to be writers on the show. Although he upset many fans with his comments, Maxtone-Graham has won six Emmys for his work on The Simpsons, and received an Annie Award for writing "The Seemingly Neverending Story".

One of the episodes written by Maxtone-Graham is "E-I-E-I-(Annoyed Grunt)", in which Homer grows a tomato-tobacco hybrid called "tomacco". Notably, it inspired an Oregon man to make his own version of tomacco by grafting a tomato stem with a tobacco root. He eventually gave some to Maxtone-Graham, who ate it.

At 6 ft 8 in (2.03 m), Maxtone-Graham inspired a character on The Simpsons: "Very Tall Man", who first appeared in "22 Short Films About Springfield".

=== Writing credits ===
Maxtone-Graham has been credited as writing the following episodes of The Simpsons:

- "Burns, Baby Burns" (1996)
- "The City of New York vs. Homer Simpson" (1997)
- "The Trouble with Trillions" (1998)
- "Trash of the Titans" (200th episode, won Primetime Emmy Award for Outstanding Animated Program For Programming less than One Hour) (1998)
- "Lisa Gets an 'A'" (1998)
- "E-I-E-I-(Annoyed Grunt)" (1999)
- "Alone Again, Natura-Diddily" (2000)
- "Tennis the Menace" (2001)
- "The Blunder Years" (2001)
- "Large Marge" (2002)
- "Dude, Where's My Ranch?" (2003)
- "Catch 'Em If You Can" (2004)
- "The Heartbroke Kid" (2005)
- "The Seemingly Never-Ending Story" (won Primetime Emmy Award for Outstanding Animated Program For Programming less than One Hour and Annie Award for "Best Writing in an Animated Television Production") (2006)
- "24 Minutes" (with Billy Kimball, won Annie Award for "Best Writing in an Animated Television Production") (2007)
- "Dangerous Curves" (with Billy Kimball) (2008)
- "Gone Maggie Gone" (with Billy Kimball, nominated for Emmy Award for Outstanding Animated Program For Programming less than One Hour) (2009)
- "The Color Yellow" (with Billy Kimball) (2010)
- "The Scorpion's Tale" (with Billy Kimball) (2011)
- "How I Wet Your Mother" (with Billy Kimball) (2012)
- "Dark Knight Court" (with Billy Kimball) (2013)
- "The Yellow Badge of Cowardge" (with Billy Kimball) (2014)

Maxtone-Graham also co-wrote the screenplays for The Simpsons Movie (2007) and Beavis and Butt-Head Do the Universe (2022).
