= The Comedy Channel (American TV channel) =

American television channel

- The Comedy Channel logo from 1989 to 1991 before merging with Ha! to become its current form, Comedy Central.

Ownership
- Owner: Home Box Office, Inc. (Time Inc./TimeWarner)
- Sister channels: HBO; Cinemax; E!

History
- Launched: November 15, 1989; 36 years ago
- Closed: April 1, 1991; 35 years ago (1 year, 137 days)
- Replaced by: Comedy Central

The Comedy Channel was an American comedy-oriented cable television network owned by Home Box Office, Inc., a division of Time Warner (now Skydance Corporation). It launched on November 15, 1989 at 6:00 p.m. Eastern Time. In 1991, HBO agreed to merge the channel with Viacom's competing channel, Ha!. The new network, CTV: The Comedy Network, premiered on April 1, 1991, but rebranded to Comedy Central on June 1, 1991.

Most of the Comedy Channel's original programs were produced in the HBO Downtown Studios at 120 East 23rd Street in Manhattan.

== Programming ==
The format prior to the merger included several original and unconventional programs such as Onion World with Rich Hall and Mystery Science Theater 3000, as well as laid-back variety/talk shows hosted by stand-up comedians, including The Sweet Life with Rachel Sweet; Tommy Sledge, Private Eye; Alan King: Inside the Comedy Mind; Night After Night with Allan Havey; Sports Monster; and The Higgins Boys and Gruber, the latter of whom performed sketches in between showings of vintage television serials Supercar, Clutch Cargo, and Bob and Ray. Commercial breaks often included "Deep Thoughts by Jack Handey," which would later be featured on Saturday Night Live.

=== Standard format ===
The standard format for these shows usually involved the various hosts introducing clips culled from the acts of stand-up comedians as well as classic comedies of the 1970s and 1980s, such as Young Frankenstein and Kentucky Fried Movie, presented in a style similar to music videos. In the early days, certain hours of the day when clips were shown without "host segments" were dubbed Short Attention Span Theater. In 1990, hosts Jon Stewart and Patty Rosborough were introduced under this title, and the show became one of the few that survived the network merger into CTV. Comedian Marc Maron later hosted the series.

In the final months before the merger, the channel developed an eight-hour programming block that was shown three times during a 24-hour period, which included reruns of Monty Python's Flying Circus.

=== Ha! and Comedy Channel merge to create Comedy Central ===
The Comedy Channel struggled both commercially and critically. Critics derided the hodgepodge of clips from comedy films and stand-up comedy acts that filled the long gaps between original programs.

In 1990, The Comedy Channel and Ha! agreed to merge their operations and form a channel called CTV: The Comedy Network, which debuted on April 1, 1991. Prior to the merger, each channel had fewer than ten million subscribers. In order to avoid trademark issues with Canadian broadcast network CTV, the name of the channel was subsequently changed to Comedy Central on June 1, 1991, with the name "Comedy Partners, Inc." appearing on the end credits of all shows produced by the new channel. The original Viacom which operated Ha! bought out the Time Warner half of the network (which operated The Comedy Channel and belonged to HBO) in 2003. Following the purchase, the name "Comedy Partners, Inc." remained on the closing credits of most Comedy Central shows.
