= EIEIO =

EIEIO may refer to:

- The refrain to the children's song, "Old MacDonald Had a Farm"
- Enforce In-order Execution of I/O, a machine instruction used on the PowerPC computer processor
- Computer bought the farm, an error message with symbol EIEIO, from the GNU Hurd operating system
- EIEIO, the Enhanced Implementation of Emacs Interpreted Objects, an object-oriented elisp system based on the Common Lisp Object System
- "E-I-E-I-O", an episode of Barney & Friends from the fourth season of the show
- "E*I*E*I*O", an episode of The New Scooby and Scrappy-Doo Show

== See also ==
- "E-I-E-I-(Annoyed Grunt)", 1999 episode of The Simpsons
