= Comedy Central (India) =

Former Indian comedy channel

- Country: India
- Broadcast area: India; Sri Lanka; Nepal; Bangladesh; Maldives
- Headquarters: Mumbai

Programming
- Language: English
- Picture format: 1080i HDTV (downscaled to 576i for the SDTV feed)

Ownership
- Owner: Viacom18 (branding licensed from Paramount Networks EMEAA)
- Sister channels: Colors Infinity; MTV; VH1; Nickelodeon; Sonic

History
- Launched: 23 January 2012; 14 years ago
- Closed: 15 March 2025; 18 months ago

Links
- Website: comedycentral.in

Comedy Central was an Indian pay television channel owned by Viacom18 under a license agreement with Paramount Networks EMEAA. The network carried programs from the American flagship network, along with domestic stand-up comedy and other acquired series. Comedy Central was discontinued on 15 March 2025.

== History ==
Comedy Central launched in India on 23 January 2012, the product of a joint venture between Viacom and TV18, promoted with a three-city standup tour by Russell Brand. The network launched in high definition on 1 July 2015.

Despite all Comedy Central international channels changed their logo between 2018–2019, the Indian version was the only one to still use the 2012 logo until their closedown alongside the Russian and Ukrainian versions of Paramount Comedy.

The channel ceased broadcasting on 15 March 2025.

== 2012 temporary broadcast prohibition ==
Comedy Central was prohibited from broadcasting in India for 10 days, from 25 May until 4 June 2012, after an inter-ministerial committee (IMC) set up by the Ministry of Information and Broadcasting found that two of its shows that aired in 2012, carried "obscene dialogues and vulgar words" that "offend good taste", violating several provisions of the Cable Television Networks Rules, 1994. The provisions of the law include "no programme should be carried in the cable service which offends against good taste or decency; no programme should be carried which contains anything obscene, defamatory, deliberate, false and suggestive innuendos and half truths". It also states that "no programme should be carried which denigrates women through the depiction in any manner of the figure of woman, her form or body or any part thereof in such a way as to have the effect of being indecent or derogatory to women or is likely to injure the public morality".

Two incidents were cited for the temporary shutdown of the channel; an episode of Stand Up Club where an unnamed stand-up performed an act with "obscene dialogues and vulgar words derogatory to women" aired on 26 May 2012, then a 4 July 2012 airing of PopCorn TV (a program imported from France without dialogue), where one of the crew members was shown standing opposite a wall, in a shop holding false legs in an open and suggestive position with sexual movements. Comedy Central apologised for the broadcast, blaming it on an "unintentional genuine error".

The network appealed the ban in the Delhi High Court, with a judge rejecting it as not an "excessive, harsh or unreasonable" penalty. The network then went dark for the next ten days. The ministry's decision to directly issue a show-cause notice and, later, order a blackout raised concerns in the Indian broadcasting industry about content restrictions. Critics felt that the government had used the vague framing of the Constitution to censor materials for viewers, threatening India's democratic traditions.

== Programming ==
=== Final programming ===
- Atypical
- Awkwafina Is Nora From Queens
- Brooklyn Nine-Nine
- The Daily Show
- Nathan for You
- The Office (US)
- Parks and Recreation
- Takeshi's Castle
- Workaholics
- Schitt's Creek
- People Just Do Nothing

=== Former programming ===
- 'Allo 'Allo!
- 30 Rock
- 3rd Rock from the Sun
- About a Boy
- Alex, Inc.
- America's Funniest Home Videos
- Anger Management
- Angie Tribeca
- A.P. Bio
- Archer
- Are We There Yet?
- Arrested Development
- Awkward
- Betty White's Off Their Rockers
- The Big Bang Theory
- Billy on the Street
- Blunt Talk
- Bob Hearts Abishola
- Call Me Fitz
- The Carmichael Show
- Carpoolers
- Challenge Accepted
- Citizen Khan
- Community
- Complete Savages
- Coupling
- Crowded
- Deadbeat
- The Detour
- Detroiters
- Dharma & Greg
- Doogie Howser, M.D.
- Dr. Ken
- Episodes
- Everybody Hates Chris
- Everybody Loves Raymond
- The Exes
- Fawlty Towers
- Friends
- Future Man
- Go On
- The Good Place
- Goodness Gracious Me
- The Great Indoors
- The Graham Norton Show
- Great News
- Greek
- Growing Up Fisher'
- Guys with Kids
- Happily Divorced
- Hope & Faith
- Hot in Cleveland
- House of Lies
- How Not to Live Your Life
- I Feel Bad
- I Survived a Japanese Game Show
- Impastor
- Impractical Jokers
- The Inbetweeners
- The IT Crowd
- The Jim Gaffigan Show
- Just for Laughs
- Kevin Can Wait
- Key & Peele
- The King of Queens
- The Kumars at No. 42
- Little Britain
- Live at Gotham
- M*A*S*H
- Malcolm in the Middle
- Man with a Plan
- Marlon
- The Middle
- Mike & Molly
- Mind Your Language
- The Mindy Project
- Mom
- Mulaney
- Murphy Brown
- My Boys
- No Tomorrow
- Odd Mom Out
- Outsourced
- Penn & Teller: Fool Us
- Perfect Couples
- Playing House
- Pranked
- Psych
- Punk'd
- Reno 911!
- Ridiculousness
- Rules of Engagement
- Samantha Who?
- Saturday Night Live
- Scrubs
- Sean Saves the World
- Seed
- Seinfeld
- Sirens
- South Park
- Suburgatory
- Suits
- Superior Donuts
- Superstore
- Telenovela
- Teen Wolf
- That '70s Show
- Threesome
- The Tonight Show Starring Jimmy Fallon
- Ugly Betty
- Undateable
- Up All Night
- Web Therapy
- Whitney
- Will & Grace
- Wipeout
- The Wonder Years
- Whose Line Is It Anyway?
- World's Craziest Fools
- Wrecked
- Younger
- Your Family or Mine
