= Army men (disambiguation) =

Army men may refer to:

- Army men, plastic toy soldiers
- Army Men, the video game series
- Army Man (magazine), the comedy magazine
- Soldiers, members of an army
