= Billy Kimball =

American writer and producer

- Education: Harvard College
- Occupations: Writer, producer
- Known for: Veep

Billy Kimball (born July 8, 1959) is an American writer and producer. He was a co-executive producer on the acclaimed HBO series Veep.

== Personal life ==
Billy Kimball was born on July 8, 1959 in New York City, where he attended Trinity School. He later graduated from Harvard College where he was an editor of the Harvard Lampoon. He is currently married to the former Alexandra Manuela Vargas Hamilton and has two daughters and a son.

== Career ==
Kimball began his career writing for the HBO series Not Necessarily the News. He was the host and executive producer of the satiric game show Clash! and the co-host (with Denis Leary) of the talk show Afterdrive both on the Ha! Network, a predecessor of Comedy Central.

As a writer, Kimball has worked on Saturday Night Live, Cedric the Entertainer Presents, and Lateline. He wrote the Independent Spirit Awards ten times since 2002 and served as a producer on the show six times since 2005. He has written nine episodes of The Simpsons, and co-wrote eight with Ian Maxtone-Graham. He was the head writer for the 88th Academy Awards in 2016 and a writer for the 89th Academy Awards in 2017.

Kimball was the original executive producer of The Late Late Show with Craig Kilborn from 1999 to 2001.

He has won an Emmy Award for Veep twice and the CableAce Award for Best Documentary. His Simpsons episode "24 Minutes" received an Annie Award in 2007 for Best Writing in an Animated Television Production. He won the Writers Guild of America Award for Outstanding Script for Comedy/Variety Special for both the 2008 and 2009 Film Independent Spirit Awards. He also won the WGA Award for "Best Comedy Writing" for Veep.

In 1994, he served as a senior manager for the United States Agency for International Development's Market Reform Project in Kyiv, Ukraine.

Kimball has a long association with former Senator Al Franken. He was the executive producer of InDecision '92, Comedy Central's coverage of the 1992 United States Presidential Election, which was anchored by Franken. From 2005 to 2007, he was the executive producer of The Al Franken Show on Air America Radio and Sundance Channel. He has edited four of Franken's books, Why Not Me?, Oh, the Things I Know!, Lies and the Lying Liars who Tell Them, and The Truth (with Jokes), all of them New York Times bestsellers.

In 2009, Kimball began to appear as a commentator on TruTV's World's Dumbest... He is currently the editor-in-chief of the on-line humor magazine The Old Yorker.

Kimball co-wrote the 2010 documentary Waiting for Superman, about the failures of American public education, with filmmaker Davis Guggenheim. The film received the Audience Award for best documentary at the 2010 Sundance Film Festival.

In May 2013, Kimball was appointed senior vice president and chief programming officer of Fusion. He served as an executive producer for The Jim Henson Company's Good Morning Today and No, You Shut Up! (both shows are under The Jim Henson Company's Henson Alternative banner).

He is a member of the Council on Foreign Relations.

== The Simpsons episodes ==
- "24 Minutes" (co-written with Ian Maxtone-Graham)
- "Smoke on the Daughter" (the only episode Kimball has written without Ian Maxtone-Graham)
- "Dangerous Curves" (co-written with Ian Maxtone-Graham)
- "Gone Maggie Gone" (co-written with Ian Maxtone-Graham)
- "The Color Yellow" (co-written with Ian Maxtone-Graham)
- "The Scorpion's Tale" (co-written with Ian Maxtone-Graham)
- "How I Wet Your Mother" (co-written with Ian Maxtone-Graham)
- "Dark Knight Court" (co-written with Ian Maxtone-Graham)
- "The Yellow Badge of Cowardge" (co-written with Ian Maxtone-Graham)

== Bibliography ==
- "Least common complaints about the new iPad". The New Yorker. April 26, 2010.
- "Bartleby the Badass". Shouts & Murmurs. The New Yorker. 88 (37): 30. November 26, 2012.
