= Clash! =

American comedy game show

- Presented by: Billy Kimball
- Country of origin: United States

Production
- Producer: Billy Kimball
- Running time: 30 minutes

Original release
- Network: Ha! (1990–1991); Comedy Central (1991)
- Release: May 1, 1990 – December 28, 1991

Clash! is an American comedy game show which aired on Ha! from May 1, 1990 to March 31, 1991, and on CTV: The Comedy Network/Comedy Central (Ha!'s successor) from April 1 to December 28. The show was produced and hosted by Billy Kimball, and the theme song was composed by Carter Burwell.

Episodes were broadcast weekdays at 10:30 AM and 6:30 PM.

== Format ==
Clash! was presented in an absurdist quiz show format in which two teams of three players each competed for prizes. Contestants were selected based on criteria such as occupation, ethnicity, religion, etc. and each team would represent one half of a rivalry. For example, an episode might pit nudists against fashion designers, librarians against noisy people, or vegetarians against butchers. Some rivalries were altered for comedic effect, such as "Cowboys vs. Indians" in which the Indians were people from India.

The game was played in three rounds. In each of the first two rounds the teams were shown four categories with four questions. The questions were each worth 10 points in the first round, with no penalty for a wrong answer. If a team swept all four questions in a category, they earned a 50-point bonus. The first round offered each team a chance to play a "Whiz Quiz" after any correct answer; a team's Whiz Quiz consisted of five questions in a category comedically suited to the team. The team had 20 seconds to attempt all five questions; each correct answer was worth 10 points, and if the team correctly answered all five questions, their total score would be doubled and they would win a bonus prize.

The second round contained four new categories, with questions worth 20 points each. Sweeping a category still earned a 50-point bonus. In this round, a "Grudge Match" would be announced at some point, in which one member of each team competed against each other in a bizarre stunt of some sort. The winner of the Grudge Match picked up an extra 50 points.

The third round was called the "Big Questions." Three categories were shown, each containing three questions worth 50, 100, and 150 points. The trailing team chose one question from each category, consisting of one 50-point question, one 100-point question, and one 150-point question. In this round, points were deducted for wrong answers. After the trailing team played their three questions, the leading team would select from the remaining questions under the same rules. The team with the highest score won a prize and advanced to the "Oval of Odds" bonus round.

The contestant who scored the most points for their team spun a six-spaced wheel and answered a single question. Giving the correct answer won a bonus prize. Five of the spaces each had a question that was extremely difficult ("What is the third word on the thirty-third page of the third book from the right on the third shelf of the third cabinet from the left in the Clash library?") while the last space had a question that was extremely easy ("What did you have for breakfast this morning?" or "How are you?").
