= Short Attention Span Theater =

- Genre: Television comedy
- Presented by: Jon Stewart; Patty Rosborough; Mark S. Allen; Marc Maron
- Country of origin: United States
- Original language: English

Original release
- Network: The Comedy Channel; Comedy Central
- Release: 1989 – 1994

Related
- Comic Remix (2002)

Short Attention Span Theater (often abbreviated to SAST) is an American clip show in which the hosts presented short segments of stand-up comedy acts and scenes from films airing on HBO and Cinemax. It aired from 1989 until 1994.

SAST premiered on The Comedy Channel in November 1989; it was one of the channel's initial programs. Because the Comedy Channel, HBO, and Cinemax were all owned by Home Box Office, Inc. (operated as a subsidiary of what was then known as Time Warner), the show was used to promote the parent corporation's programming.

In April 1991, the Comedy Channel merged with Ha!, Viacom's competing comedy channel, to form CTV: The Comedy Network; two months later, CTV rebranded as Comedy Central. The network continued to order new episodes of SAST after this transition, but with some modifications.

SAST had no presenter during its first few weeks. In 1990, the Comedy Channel reformatted the show and hired Jon Stewart and Patty Rosborough to present it—which they did until 1993. Mark S. Allen replaced them for two seasons. After that, the format was altered slightly. The show now took place in "the basement of Comedy Central", it was shortened to a half-hour and centered on one topic, and Marc Maron was hired as host.

Among the show's various guest hosts were Janet Decker, Joe Bolster, Laura Kightlinger, Sue Murphy, and brothers Brian Regan and Dennis Regan. In between clips, the hosts' banter often covered events in entertainment news.

SAST was the first television venue for Marc Weiner's "head puppet" comedy sketches. The puppets' heads are the size of a human's, but the bodies are disproportionately small.

In 2002, several years after SAST's conclusion, Comedy Central broadcast a similar series called Comic Remix. The show had a comparable format, and re-used many of the clips previously featured on SAST.

In 2005, two shorts from SAST were animated for inclusion as bonus material for the DVD-Video release of the first season of Dr. Katz, Professional Therapist.
