= John Maxtone-Graham =

American historian

- Born: John Kurtz Maxtone-Graham; August 2, 1929; Orange, New Jersey, U.S.
- Died: July 8, 2015 (aged 85); Manhattan, New York, U.S.
- Occupations: Historian, writer
- Spouse: Mary

Signature
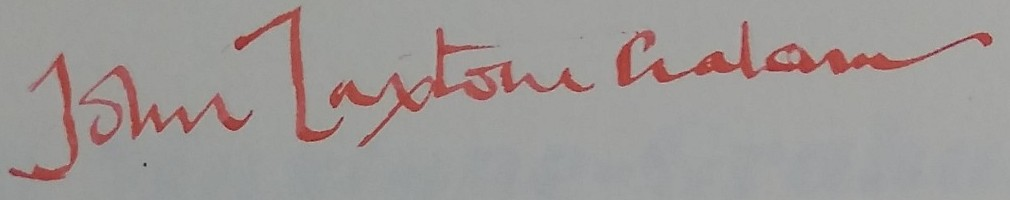

John Kurtz Maxtone-Graham (August 2, 1929 – July 6, 2015) was a Scottish-American speaker and writer on ocean liners and maritime history.

== Biography ==
Maxtone-Graham was born in Orange, New Jersey, to a Scottish father and an American mother. He graduated from Brown University in 1951. He served in the United States Marine Corps during the Korean War and then worked as a Broadway stage manager. In 1972 he wrote a social history and appreciation of the Atlantic express liners, The Only Way to Cross, which was a success as a mass-market publication. This was followed by other books on express liner history. France/Norway was published in 2010; in March 2012 he wrote and published Titanic Tragedy; and in October 2014 he published his final book, SS United States: Red, White, & Blue Riband, Forever.

He was married twice and had four children. He is the father of writer Ian Maxtone-Graham. John Maxtone-Graham died from respiratory failure in Manhattan on July 6, 2015, aged 85.

== See also ==
- Frank O. Braynard
