= E-I-E-I-(Annoyed Grunt) =

- The Simpsons episode
- Episode no.: Season 11; Episode 5
- Directed by: Bob Anderson
- Written by: Ian Maxtone-Graham
- Production code: AABF19
- Original air date: November 7, 1999

Guest appearance
- The B-52's sing "Glove Slap"

Episode features
- Chalkboard gag: "I did not win the Nobel Fart Prize"
- Couch gag: The living room is set up like a trendy nightclub. The bouncer lets Marge, Lisa, Bart, and Maggie in, but sends Homer away.
- Commentary: Mike Scully; Ian Maxtone-Graham; George Meyer; Matt Selman; Rob Baur

Episode chronology
← Previous "Treehouse of Horror X"	Next → "Hello Gutter, Hello Fadder"
- The Simpsons season 11

"E-I-E-I-(Annoyed Grunt)", also known as "E-I-E-I-D'oh", is the fifth episode of the eleventh season of the American animated television series The Simpsons. It originally aired on the Fox Network in the United States on November 7, 1999. In the episode, inspired by a Zorro movie, Homer begins slapping people with a glove and challenging them to duels to get whatever he wants. When a Southern gentleman accepts Homer's request for a duel, the Simpsons run off to the old farm Homer lived in with his parents and breed a dangerously addictive but successful tobacco/tomato hybrid called "Tomacco". The episode was written by Ian Maxtone-Graham and directed by Bob Anderson.

== Plot ==
Having learned from a Zorro movie how to challenge someone to a duel by slapping them with a glove, Homer goes around town slapping people and getting his way, until a gun-toting Southern colonel accepts his challenge.

The next morning, the colonel and his wife wait outside the Simpsons' house. The family flee to the farmhouse where Homer grew up. Homer becomes a farmer, but the land is poor and nothing grows. He then calls Lenny and asks for some plutonium. With plutonium, the crops grow, but since Homer had mixed tomato seeds with tobacco seeds, a new plant is created, resembling a tomato, but with brown, tobacco-flavored flesh. Homer calls the mutated crop "Tomacco"; it tastes terrible, but is highly addictive. Homer and Marge set up a stall, selling Homer's Tomacco and Marge's fresh-baked mincemeat pie. While the pies do not sell well, the Tomacco is such a success that executives from Laramie Cigarettes offer to buy the rights to it for $150 million.

Lisa protests that the Simpsons cannot accept the tobacco executives' money, but Homer does not understand what she means and rejects the offer as insulting, demanding $150 billion, which they refuse. While the Simpsons are negotiating, Tomacco-addicted animals from other farms break into their fields and eat their crop. Holding the only plant left, the family run into the house, where Lisa urges Homer to destroy it; he refuses, until the crazed animals break into the house itself. He tosses the plant into the air, and it lands in the hands of a Laramie executive who happens to be there. The executives' helicopter leaves, but a Tomacco-addicted sheep has stowed away and attacks them. The helicopter crashes, killing everyone on board except the sheep, and destroying the final Tomacco plant. The Simpsons return home to find that the Southern gentleman and his wife are still waiting for the duel. It takes place: Homer is shot in the arm, but declines to go to the hospital until he has had some of Marge's mincemeat pie.

== Production ==
The episode was written by Ian Maxtone-Graham and directed by Bob Anderson as part of the eleventh season of The Simpsons (1999–2000). The American rock band The B-52's guest starred in the episode as themselves singing the song "Glove Slap", a parody of their song "Love Shack". The process of making a 'tomacco' product had first been documented in a 1959 Scientific American article, which stated that nicotine could be found in the tomato plant after grafting. Due to the academic and industrial importance of this breakthrough process, this article was reprinted in a 1968 Scientific American compilation.

== Cultural references ==
After Moe refers to Homer as "heavyset", he excuses himself by saying "You ain't no, uh, Tommy Tune".

=== The Poke of Zorro ===
The Simpsons go to a screening of The Poke of Zorro, a loose parody of the Zorro film The Mask of Zorro (1998). Jonathan Gray wrote in Watching with The Simpsons: Television, Parody, and Intertextuality that "The Poke of Zorro ridicules the outlandishness of Hollywood blockbuster fare, especially its blatant historical inaccuracies which sees the film feature Zorro, King Arthur, the Three Musketeers, the Scarlet Pimpernel, the Man in the Iron Mask and ninjas in nineteenth century Mexico."

The cast list for The Poke of Zorro is also deliberately nonsensical. It includes John Byner as Zorro, Shawn Wayans as "Robot Zorro", Rita Rudner as "Mrs. Zorro", Curtis "Booger" Armstrong as the Scarlet Pimpernel, Cheech Marin as King Arthur, Gina Gershon as the Man in the Iron Mask, Posh Spice as "Wise Nun", Meryl Streep as "Stupid Nun", Stone Cold Steve Austin as "Time Traveller #1", Spalding Gray as "Gay-Seeming Prince", Eric Roberts as "Man Beating Mule", Pelé as the "Hiccupping Narrator", Robert Evans as Martin Van Buren, Anthony Hopkins as "Corky" (a reference to Hopkins' character in the 1978 film Magic), and James Earl Jones as the voice of a "Magic Taco". The film also includes thanks credits for the National Film Board of Canada, the Philadelphia Flyers NHL team, the "Makers of Whip Balm", Penthouse publisher Bob Guccione, the Teamsters Pension Fund, "AAABest Bail Bonds" and "Mr. and Mrs. Curtis 'Booger' Armstrong".

=== Advertisements ===
During The Poke of Zorro, there are advertisements which reference products and movies. The Buzz Cola advertisement shown before The Poke of Zorro is a parody of the opening Normandy invasion sequence from the film Saving Private Ryan (1998). Gray writes that it "scorns the proclivity of ads to use any gimmick to grab attention, regardless of the ethics: as an indignant Lisa asks incredulously, 'Do they really think cheapening the memory of our veterans will sell soda?'" Amongst the other films advertised at the theater is My Dinner with Jar Jar, a reference to the character Jar Jar Binks from Star Wars: Episode I – The Phantom Menace and the 1981 film My Dinner with Andre.

=== Music ===
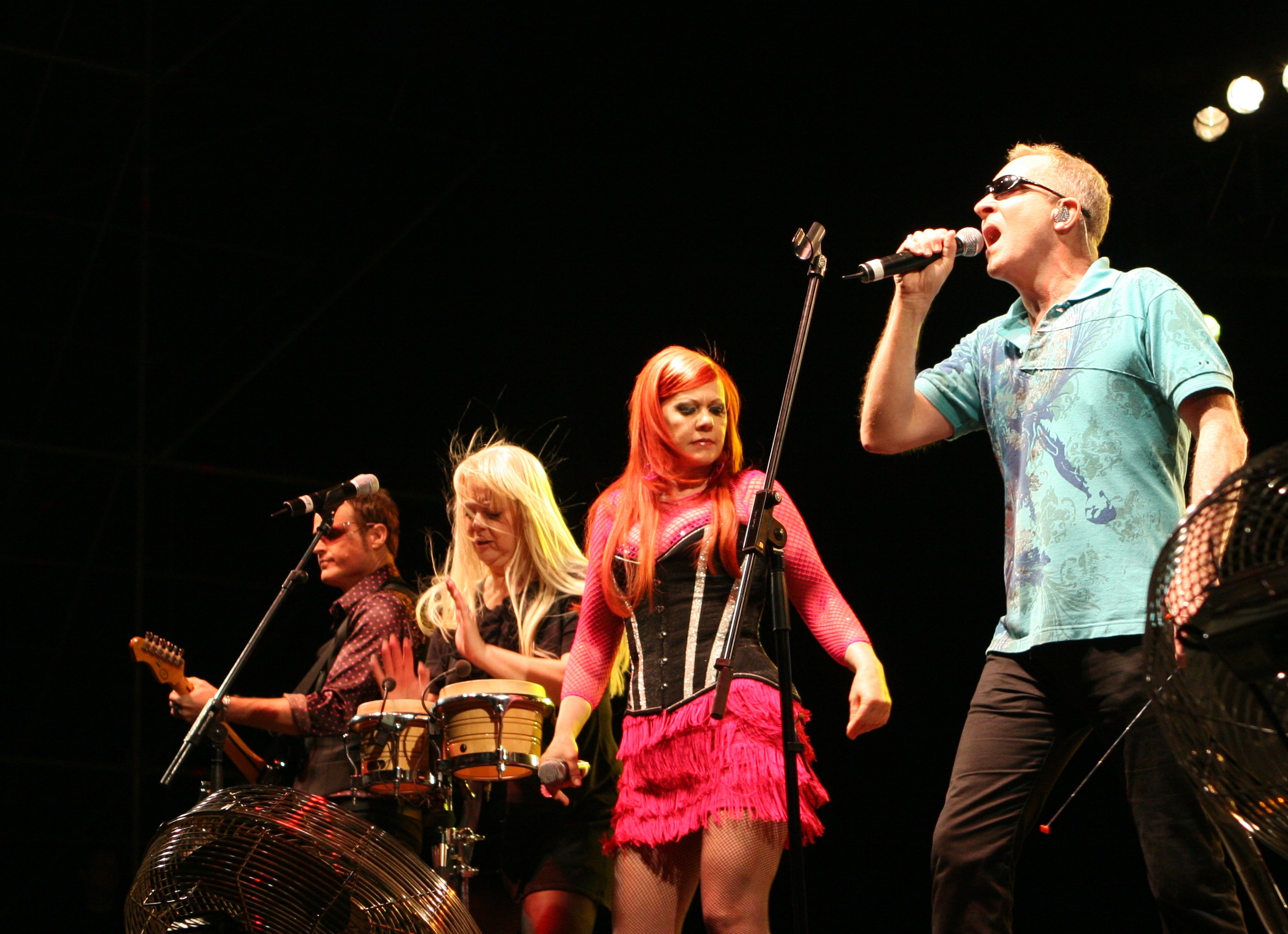
The B-52's sing the song "Glove Slap" in the episode

The episode features multiple references to songs and themes. The song "Glove Slap" is a parody of the song "Love Shack". The B-52's sang both the original and the amended version used in the episode. The music playing during the sequence where the Simpsons begin farming is the theme tune from the television series Green Acres. A farmer is shown using an elephant to measure his corn plants' height; this is a reference to the song "Oh, What a Beautiful Mornin'" in the musical Oklahoma!, which features the line "the corn is as high an elephant's eye". The Southern colonel's horn plays the opening few notes of the song "Dixie".

== Release ==
The episode originally aired on the Fox network in the United States on November 7, 1999. On October 7, 2008, the episode was released on DVD as part of the box set The Simpsons – The Complete Eleventh Season. Staff members Mike Scully, Ian Maxtone-Graham, George Meyer, and Matt Selman participated in the DVD audio commentary for the episode.

While reviewing the eleventh season of The Simpsons, DVD Movie Guide's Colin Jacobson commented that "E-I-E-I-(Annoyed Grunt)" provides "the kind of episode typical of the series' 'post-classic' years. While it doesn't become a dud, it lacks the spark and zing typical of the best Simpsons. We get a mix of decent moments but nothing that elevates the episode above the level of mediocrity." In the July 26, 2007 issue of Nature, the scientific journal's editorial staff listed the episode among "The Top Ten science moments in The Simpsons." The journal praises Homer's attempts to be a farmer, which involve using plutonium as a fertilizer and crossbreeding DNA from tobacco seeds and tomato seeds to create an addicting fruit. In 2011, Keith Plocek of LA Weekly's Squid Ink blog named "E-I-E-I-(Annoyed Grunt)" the tenth best episode of the show with a food theme. The Phoenix New Times listed the episode as one of the top ten Simpsons episodes of all time.

== Legacy ==
A Simpsons fan, Rob Baur of Lake Oswego, Oregon, was inspired by the episode. Remembering the article in a textbook, Baur cultivated real tomacco in 2003. The plant produced offspring that looked like a normal tomato, but Baur suspected that it contained a lethal amount of nicotine and thus would be inedible. Testing later proved that the leaves of the plant contained some nicotine. Both plants are members of the same family, Solanaceae or nightshade. The tomacco plant bore tomaccoes until it died after 18 months, spending one winter indoors. Baur appeared on the episode's DVD commentary, discussing the plant and resulting fame.

The 2004 convention of the American Dialect Society named tomacco as the new word "least likely to succeed." Tomacco was a wordspy.com "Word of the Day".

Sneed's Feed & Seed

A throwaway background joke in the episode is a store by the name of "Sneed's Feed & Seed (Formerly Chuck's)", written to suggest that the previous owner might have called it "Chuck's Fuck & Suck". The phrase was adopted as an Internet meme on the online imageboard 4chan, with members attempting to push the word "Sneed" into Internet polls and spreading a hoax screenshot stating that the Anti-Defamation League considers the word a hate symbol.
