= Products produced from The Simpsons =

Recreations of Products from The Simpsons

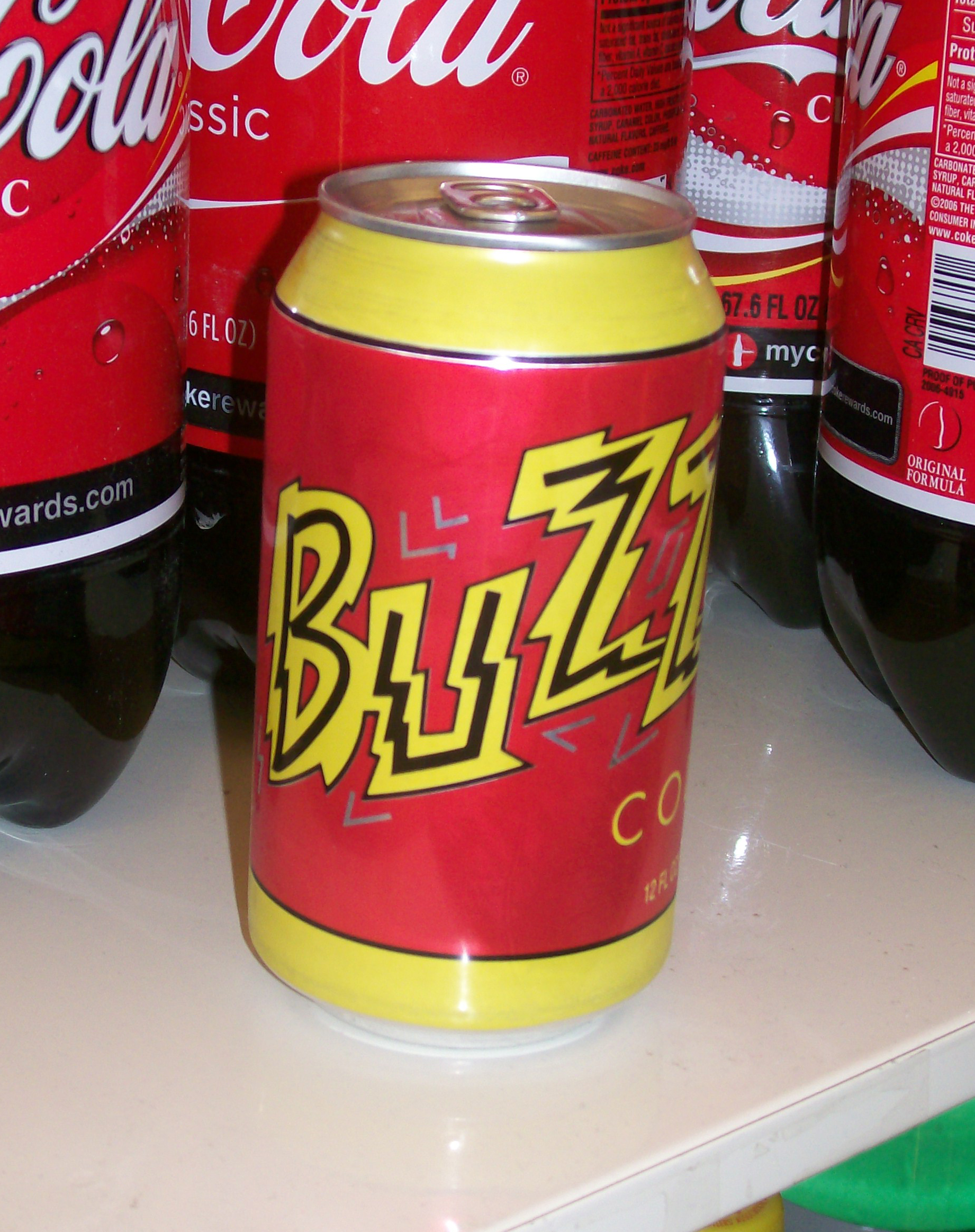
A promotional can of Buzz Cola for The Simpsons Movie

The long-running television animation The Simpsons has featured a number of products, sometimes spoofs of real-life products, that have subsequently been recreated by real world companies attempting to exploit the popularity of The Simpsons. In 2007, as part of a "reverse product placement" marketing campaign for The Simpsons Movie, real life versions of a number of Simpsons products were sold in 7-Eleven stores. Real cans of Buzz Cola, boxes of Krusty-O's cereal, Squishees, and a special edition (#711) of the Radioactive Man Comic were all sold in stores alongside other The Simpsons merchandise.

== Buzz Cola ==
Buzz Cola is a brand of cola, and an officially licensed product of 20th Century Studios. Its slogan is "twice the sugar, twice the caffeine". The slogan is a parody of the former Jolt Cola slogan "all the sugar and twice the caffeine". A prior slogan used was "There's a little boogie in every bottle (can)".

Sometimes Buzz Cola is used for making a statement of the advertising industry. In "E-I-E-I-(Annoyed Grunt)" (season 11, 1999) the Simpson family is at the movies watching the ads. Here they watch an Allied Forces soldier storm the Normandy beaches and charge a German. The German falls to the ground dead and the Allied soldier reaches for a can of Buzz Cola in his belt pocket. A voice over then says "Buzz Cola: The taste you kill for!" and then the German comes alive again to say "Available in ze lobby". Jonathan Grey writes in his book Watching With The Simpsons that "the cola ad, for instance, scorns the proclivity of ads to use any gimmick to grasp attention, regardless of ethics".

Although a general parody of popular cola drinks, parallels can be observed between Buzz Cola and Pepsi. For example, many of the mock television advertisements that appear for Buzz Cola on The Simpsons follow the same youth-oriented approach of real Pepsi commercials. In another example, Homer gets his arm stuck in a vending machine selling "Crystal Buzz Cola", a parody of Crystal Pepsi. In the episode "Dude, Where's My Ranch?," Maggie Simpson dances in her crib with her midriff exposed while a Britney Spears tune plays in the background and produces a can of Buzz Cola at the end of her small dance, parodying the Pepsi advertising done by Spears in the late 1990s and early 2000s. There is also a "Buzz Cola with Lemon" version of the product, with the slogan "damn, that's a lemony cola". In addition, in a later episode, there was an old ad for Buzz Cola, stating that it has the "rejuvenating power of cocaine" in it. In the video game The Simpsons: Hit & Run, aliens Kang and Kodos use a "new and improved" Buzz Cola formula to brainwash the citizens of Springfield into performing stupid stunts for their reality TV show, Foolish Earthlings. They also dump it into the town's water supply, which reanimates the dead and creates zombies.

In July 2007, 7-Eleven rebranded some stores to look like Kwik-E-Marts in select cities to promote The Simpsons Movie. Real cans of Buzz Cola were available at those locations, as well as most other 7-Elevens throughout the United States and Canada. The soda in these cans was produced by the Cott Corporation, which also makes RC Cola outside the United States.

Buzz Cola first appeared in the 1984 movie Surf II.

== Duff Beer ==
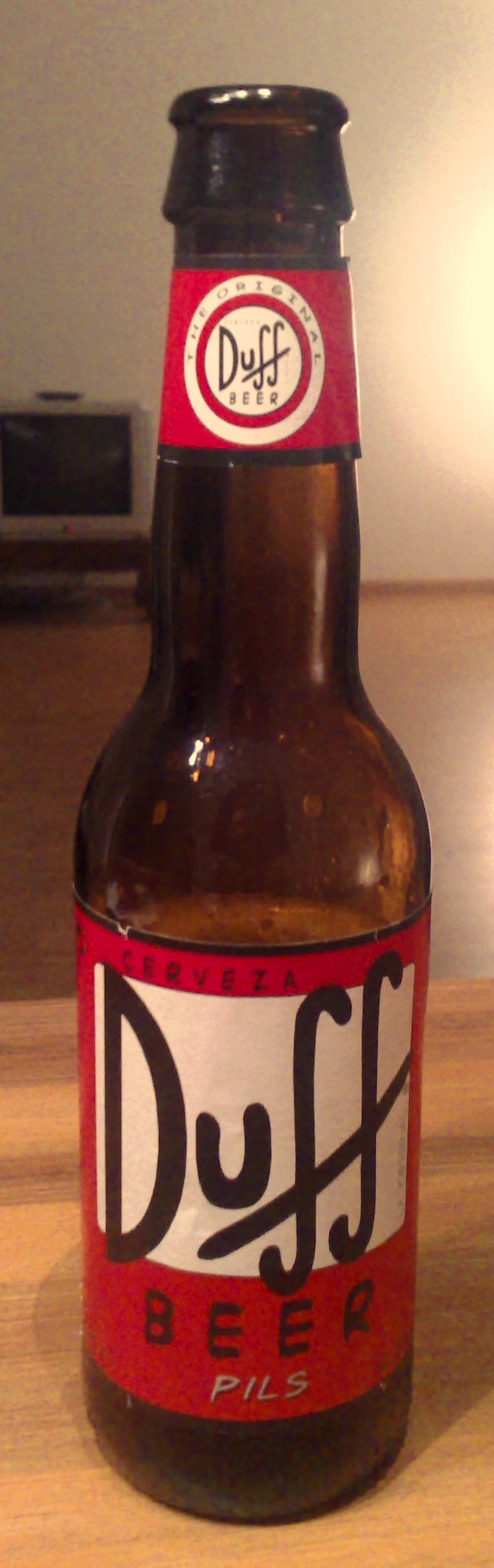
Duff Beer

With its corporate spokesperson Duffman, Duff Beer is a parody of stereotypical American beer: cheap, mass-produced, poor-quality and heavily advertised. It is Homer's favorite beer and sold in all the bars of Springfield. Its slogan is "Can't get enough of that wonderful Duff".

The chief competitor of Duff Beer is Fudd Beer, which is intentionally spelled with a parallel swapping of the consonants. Homer became aware of Fudd Beer while patronizing a "redneck bar" in nearby Spittle County. It was later revealed to be considered very popular in Springfield's rival town of Shelbyville. Moe said he thought it had been banned "after all those hillbillies went blind", suggesting methanol poisoning.

Lion Nathan, an Australian brewery, started to brew their own ‘Duff’ in the mid-1990s. 20th Century Fox sued, and only a few cans were produced. In the process, the beer became a collector's item, with one case selling for US$13,000. Since the 2000s, several Duff brands exist worldwide.

Duff Beer was not sold at 7-Eleven because the promoters wanted to have "good, responsible fun." However, a Duff Energy Drink was released in place of the Duff Beer.

== Krusty-O's ==
Krusty-O's is a brand of breakfast cereal endorsed by Krusty the Clown which prominently features his likeness on the box. The real KrustyO's, sold by 7-Eleven, were produced by the Malt-O-Meal corporation.

Krusty-Brand Cereal is the catalyst for the episode "'Round Springfield", when Bart swallows a "jagged metal Krusty-O" included in the box as a premium and is sent to the hospital. Later in the episode when Krusty holds a press conference to show that swallowing the jagged metal Krusty-O is not dangerous, he immediately begins to gag before he is informed he swallowed a "regular" Krusty-O, which he claims must be "poison". At the end of the episode, another box of Krusty-O's is shown with the promotion: "Flesh-Eating Bacteria In Every Box!".

== Radioactive Man ==
Radioactive Man #1

Radioactive Man is within the show a long-running superhero comic book series featuring Radioactive Man and his sidekick, Fallout Boy. According to one episode, there are 1,000 issues of the comic book. In the real world, Bongo Comics has produced a smaller number of issues of Radioactive Man. Radioactive Man is one of the four 'premiere' series released by Bongo Comics in late 1993. The series has been released in two volumes, an early run from 1993–1994, and the current run that has been published since 2000. Smaller Radioactive Man stories have also been published in Simpsons Comics. As a tie-in promotion of The Simpsons Movie a special "Radioactive Man Comic Book Edition #711" was sold at 7-Elevens as part of their Kwik-E-Mart promotion.

Within the Bongo Comics, Radioactive Man is secretly Claude Kane III, a millionaire playboy whose personality was well-intentioned, but bumbling and not overly bright. In addition (which became a recurring storyline element), Claude's personality was permanently stuck in a conservative 1950s outlook on everything, no matter what the time era in question was. A running gag is that in order to preserve his secret identity, Claude is constantly wearing various types of hats, in order to conceal the lightning bolt-shaped shrapnel sticking out of his head.

Issue #1 of the Bongo comic differs from Radioactive Man #1 as seen in The Simpsons episode "Three Men and a Comic Book". While featuring a similar scenario and accident (Claude getting his trousers caught on barbed wire just before a mega-bomb explodes is a parody of Bruce Banner getting caught by the Gamma Bomb in the Incredible Hulk #1), the Bongo series' Claude was not wearing tattered clothes. In the comic book, Claude's survival is due in part to a large thunderbolt-shaped shard of metal embedded in his head by the explosion. Claude would attempt to remove the bolt throughout the book series, but each attempt has nasty consequences which results in it being put back in his scalp again. Additionally, the bolt's presence would save his life numerous times in increasingly bizarre ways.

Maintaining the satirical standards of the television show, these comics often parody genre comic books, and the reader can follow the evolution of Radioactive Man from a 1950s irradiated hero through the politically reactionary or radical years of the 1960s and 1970s, and the dark, troubled years of the 1980s and 1990s comic book hero. Indeed, one comic displays a startling similarity to Alan Moore's Watchmen, with Radioactive Man taking the part of state-supported hero Doctor Manhattan. The comics are published as if they were the actual Simpsons universe's Radioactive Man comics; a "1970s"-published comic features a letter written by a ten-year-old Marge Bouvier, for instance. The comic also takes the idea that the title has been running since the 1950s and each issue of the real series is a random issue from that run. So one issue might be issue #357, the next #432 and the next #34, etc.

== Squishee ==
Squishee (sometimes spelled Squishy or Squishie) is a frozen slushie from The Simpsons TV series, usually purchased at the fictional Kwik-E-Mart which is managed by Apu. It is an apparent reference to 7-Eleven's Slurpee. In the thirteenth-season episode "The Sweetest Apu", Apu has the Squishee machine replaced with one of a similar drink called the "Smooshie," whose flavors reportedly include "shopping bag" and "dog fur".

The fictional version of Squishees are reputed for being dangerous to health—Squishee flavorings have, if ingested in sufficient quantities, hallucinogenic properties. According to the Simpsons comic, Squishees allegedly contain no natural ingredients (not even pure water), create dangerous cases of brain freeze, and are even described as "a thick, gloopy, tooth-rotting mixture of crushed ice and syrup". Flavors include: blue, red, lime green, Chutney, Wheatgrass, Champagne, cherry, and the Twenty-One Syrup Salute. Bart and Milhouse on one occasion went on a "Squishee bender" after drinking a squishee that was made entirely from syrup. Many other random flavors appear in the comics, including Chinese New Year, Plum, Raita and the black-colored "Squish of Death" (which causes spontaneous vomiting), which actually turned out to be just a mixture of the red and blue flavors.

In 2007, as part of the Kwik-E-Mart promotion for The Simpsons Movie, Slurpees at 7-Elevens were renamed "Squishees" and sold in special collector cups.

== Tomacco ==
Tomacco was originally a fictional plant that was a hybrid between tomatoes and tobacco, from a 1999 episode of The Simpsons titled "E-I-E-I-(Annoyed Grunt)". The method used to create the tomacco in the episode is fictional. In the episode, the tomacco was accidentally created by Homer when he planted his fields with a mixture of tomato seeds and tobacco seeds, fertilized with plutonium. The result is a tomato that has a dried, brown tobacco center, and, although being described as tasting terrible by many characters, is also immediately and powerfully addictive. The creation is promptly labeled "tomacco" by Homer and sold in large quantities to unsuspecting passersby. A cigarette company, Laramie Tobacco Co., seeing the opportunity to legally sell their products to children, offers to buy the rights to market tomacco, but Homer demands one thousand times as much money as they wish to pay him, and the company withdraws. Eventually, all of the tomacco plants are eaten by farm animals – except for the one remaining plant, which later goes down in an explosive helicopter crash with the cigarette company's lawyers.

The process of making tomacco was first revealed in a 1959 Scientific American article, which stated that nicotine could be found in the tomato plant after grafting. Due to the academic and industrial importance of this breakthrough process, this article was reprinted in a 1968 Scientific American compilation.

A Simpsons fan, Rob Baur of Lake Oswego, Oregon, was inspired by the episode. Remembering the article in a textbook, Baur cultivated a tomacco in 2003 by grafting together tobacco and tomato plants. The plant produced fruit that looked like a normal tomato, but Baur suspected that it contained a lethal amount of nicotine and thus would be inedible. Testing later proved that the leaves of the plant contained some nicotine, though a sample from the fruit was unable to be examined by the same laboratory. Both plants are members of the same family, Solanaceae or nightshade. The tomacco plant bore tomaccoes until it died after 18 months, spending one winter indoors. Baur was featured on the "E-I-E-I-(Annoyed Grunt)" audio commentary in the Simpsons Season 11 DVD box set discussing the plant and resulting fame.

The 2004 convention of the American Dialect Society named tomacco as the new word "least likely to succeed." Tomacco was a Word Spy "Word of the Day".
