= George Meyer =

American producer and writer (born 1956)

- Meyer in 1992
- Born: 1956 (age 69–70); Pennsylvania, U.S.
- Education: Harvard University
- Occupation: Television writer
- Partner: Maria Semple
- Children: 1
- Writing career
- Period: 1981–present
- Genre: Humor

George Meyer (born 1956) is an American producer and writer. Meyer is best known for his work on The Simpsons, where he served as a scriptwriter and gag writer (for which he is credited as a producer) and led the show's communal rewriting process for much of its earlier run. He wrote such episodes as "Homer the Heretic" and "Bart's Inner Child" and has been publicly credited with "thoroughly shap[ing] ... the comedic sensibility" of the show.

Raised in Tucson, Meyer attended Harvard University. There, after becoming president of the Harvard Lampoon, he graduated in 1978 with a degree in biochemistry. Abandoning plans to attend medical school, Meyer attempted to make money through dog racing but failed after two months. After a series of short-term jobs he was hired in 1981 by David Letterman, on the advice of two of Meyer's Harvard Lampoon cowriters, to join the writing team of his show Late Night with David Letterman.

Meyer left after two seasons and went on to write for The New Show, Not Necessarily the News and Saturday Night Live. Tired of life in New York, Meyer moved to Boulder, Colorado where he wrote a screenplay for a film for Letterman to star in. The project fell through and Meyer then founded the humor zine Army Man which garnered a strong following, although Meyer ended it after three issues. The producer Sam Simon was a fan and he hired Meyer to write for the animated sitcom The Simpsons in 1989. He has held a number of positions on the show and also cowrote The Simpsons Movie. Meyer is in a relationship with the writer Maria Semple and the two have a daughter.

== Early life and education ==
Born in Pennsylvania, United States in 1956, Meyer grew up in Tucson, Arizona. He is the eldest of eight children in a Roman Catholic family of German ancestry. His parents both worked in the real estate business. Meyer has made jokes about his somewhat unhappy childhood, stating that one common argument in his household was "which family member ruined a holiday", while his sister noted Meyer was frequently blamed for the family's problems. Due to its size, family activities were limited so Meyer watched lots of television and read Mad magazine. He is an Eagle Scout and an altar boy and wrote for the student newspaper. He grew up hoping to one day become either a priest or ballplayer. He was uninterested in television, only finding humor in Get Smart and Batman, where he appreciated its "loopy, irreverent humor."

Meyer attended Harvard University, where he served as president of the Harvard Lampoon. The fact that people took humor "very seriously" at the Lampoon "changed [Meyer's] life." In 1977, he and several other Lampoon staffers wrote The Harvard Lampoon Big Book of College Life (ISBN 0385134460), a volume commissioned by Doubleday. Aside from the Lampoon, his grades at Harvard were average and he suffered several bouts of depression. He graduated in 1978 with a degree in biochemistry and was accepted into medical school, but decided not to enroll.

Meyer commented on his Roman Catholic upbringing in a 2000 New Yorker profile:

People talk about how horrible it is to be brought up Catholic, and it's all true. The main thing was that there was no sense of proportion. I would chew a piece of gum at school, and the nun would say, 'Jesus is very angry with you about that,' and on the wall behind her would be a dying, bleeding guy on a cross. That's a horrifying image to throw at a little kid. You really could almost think that your talking in line, say, was on a par with killing Jesus.

== Career ==
=== Early career ===
I don't remember a lot of what I write. I try to release it after it's out there so that I can be fresh again. I find that the creative side of my brain and the archival side of my brain don't work well together. When I've done my best work, I've been in a trance-like state. I write jokes that are more by-the-numbers, but they tend to have a flat, pedestrian quality compared to the dizzying flights of silliness that we occasionally achieve.

— Meyer in 2004

After college, Meyer moved to Denver, Colorado, planning to "scientifically" win a fortune through dog racing. However, he ran out of money after two weeks. He then worked in a variety of jobs including substitute teacher and salesman in a clothing store, and also won $2,000 on the game show Jeopardy!. At one point he worked in a research lab as an assistant, studying glycoproteins "in the hope that they would prove the key to cell-cell recognition." Meanwhile, fellow Lampoon writers Tom Gammill and Max Pross suggested Meyer to comedian David Letterman who, along with head writer Merrill Markoe, hired him as a member of the writing staff on Letterman's new late night show. Letterman noted: "Everything in his submission, down to the last little detail, was so beautifully honed." Meyer wrote several recurring gags for the show, including "Crushing Things With A Steamroller". His ambitions for the show were grandiose; "I wanted to challenge the audience every night, stagger them with brilliance, blast them into a higher plane of existence," he later explained.

Meyer left to write for The New Show in late 1983, a short-lived variety series from Saturday Night Live creator Lorne Michaels. He shared an office with writer Jack Handey, whom he credited with giving him comedy advice. Following this, he joined the writing teams at Not Necessarily the News, and Saturday Night Live beginning in 1985. He later called working on SNL an "exhilarating, frustrating, stressful, and indelible experience." Meyer's work was not well regarded among the SNL writers and producers. He said: "My stuff wasn't very popular at Saturday Night. It was regarded as really fringey, and a lot of times my sketches would get cut. Sometimes they would get cut after dress rehearsal, and I would have the horrible experience of looking out and seeing a painter carefully touching up my set and getting it all ready to be smashed to pieces and sent to a landfill in Brooklyn. It was just a mismatch, although I didn't realize it at the time." He left the show in 1987.

Meyer moved to Boulder, Colorado because he "just wanted to get as far from the New York environment as [he] could." There, he wrote a film script for Letterman; the project was dropped due to the success of Letterman's show, although several of its jokes were later used in The Simpsons when no other ideas could be found. He spent time "skiing, going to poetry readings, and trying to meet girls from the University of Colorado." He founded the humor zine Army Man; he wrote the eight-page first issue almost wholly by himself, publishing just 200 copies which he gave to his friends. Meyer had been disappointed by the decline of National Lampoon and felt that there was no longer a magazine which has the sole purpose of being funny. With Army Man he "tried to make something that had no agenda other than to make you laugh." He claimed that "[he] didn't know what [he] was doing," and reprinted material without obtaining permission, including a review of Cannonball Run II. He added: "I like to think that Army Man was somewhere between a real publication and a very irresponsible, lawbreaking zine." Army Man gained a strong following and was listed on Rolling Stone's "Hot List" in 1989. Meyer noted: "The only rule was that the stuff had to be funny and pretty short. To me, the quintessential Army Man joke was one of John Swartzwelder's: 'They can kill the Kennedys. Why can't they make a cup of coffee that tastes good?' It's a horrifying idea juxtaposed with something really banal-and yet there's a kind of logic to it. It's illuminating because it's kind of how Americans see things: Life's a big jumble, but somehow it leads to something I can consume. I love that." Meyer suspended publication with the third issue, after offers to take the magazine national made him fear that it would lose its best qualities. According to The Believer: "In comedy circles, [Army Man has] taken on almost mythological proportions." This was met with varying reactions from Meyer, who felt "embarrassed when people build it up as this monumental work of comedy. It was just a silly little escapade, never meant to be enshrined."

=== The Simpsons ===
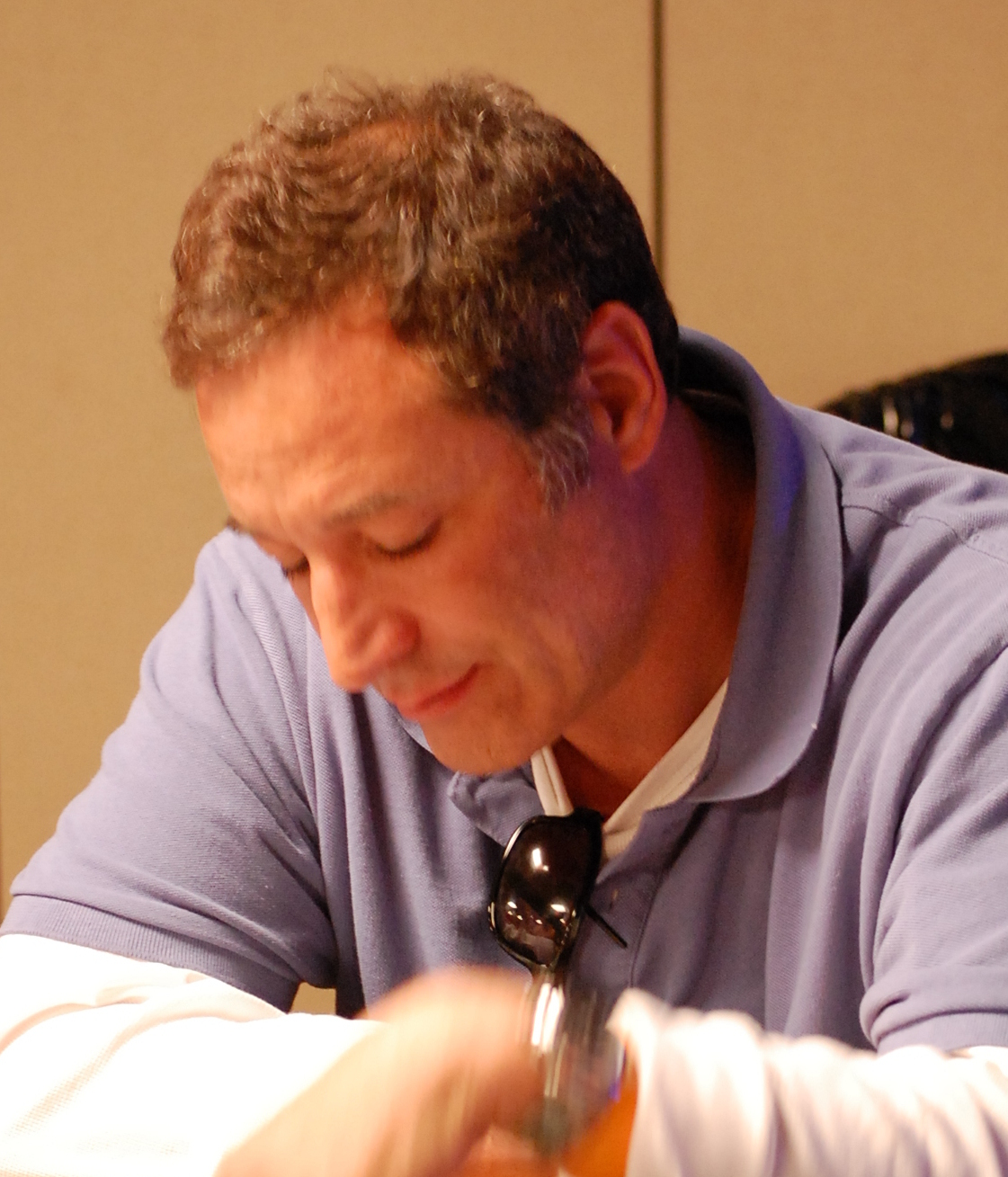
Sam Simon hired Meyer for The Simpsons after being impressed by Army Man.

One reader was Sam Simon, a producer of the animated sitcom The Simpsons. He sent Meyer a compilation reel of Simpsons shorts from Fox variety show The Tracey Ullman Show that preceded the development of the series. Meyer turned down the job initially, but was offered a second chance to work as a creative consultant in the fall of 1989, which he accepted. Simon hired Meyer along with Army Man contributors Swartzwelder and Jon Vitti; the earliest episode produced on which Meyer is credited is the first season episode "Homer's Night Out". Promoted to a producer in the show's second season, Meyer, for much of the following decade, played an active role in the show's extensive group script rewriting sessions in the "rewrite room", a role he performed more than solo script work; indeed he has only been credited for writing or co-writing twelve episodes. A. O. Scott described him as the "guru" of the room. In the room, according to Mike Reiss, writers would "involuntarily glance at Meyer for approval when they pitch lines of their own". By 1995, Meyer became tired of the show's lengthy writing schedule and decided to leave after the sixth season to work on a film or TV pilot script. He soon returned, however, as an executive producer and full-time member of the writing room the following season. Following the departure of showrunner Mike Scully in 2001, Meyer (beginning with season 13) assumed a reduced role on the series as a non-executive producer, but remained moderately involved in the rewrite process. In 2004 he noted: "It's hard to leave The Simpsons. Every once in a while I get romantic notions that I should be doing something much more subterranean. Something like Army Man, or maybe guerrilla filmmaking." He has attempted several TV projects that were not picked up. He ultimately left the show in 2005 (following the writing of season 16), and received his final credits in episodes held over for season 17. In 2007, Meyer returned to co-write The Simpsons Movie, which he later had mixed feelings about: "We worked so hard, and people liked it, but it still feels slapdash to me."

Meyer has been credited with "thoroughly shap[ing] ... the comedic sensibility" of The Simpsons; in 2000, Mike Scully, the show runner for the series at the time, called him "the best comedy writer in Hollywood." Scully said he was "the main reason" why The Simpsons [was] still so good after all these years." Vitti has said Meyer's "fingerprints are on nearly every script" and he "exerts as much influence on the show as anyone can without being one of the creators," while recounting how "a show that you have the writer's credit for will run, and the next day people will come up to you and tell you how great it was. Then they'll mention their two favorite lines, and both of them will be George's." Bill Oakley noted Meyer has "been there since the beginning adding thousands of jokes and plot twists, etc., that everyone considers classic and brilliant.

Meyer has a "deep suspicion of social institutions and tradition in general," which has affected the writing of his own episodes of The Simpsons such as "Homer the Heretic", "Mr. Lisa Goes to Washington" and "Bart vs. Thanksgiving". For his work on The Simpsons, Saturday Night Live and Late Night with David Letterman, Meyer has won and received multiple Primetime Emmy Award nominations, including the award for Outstanding Writing in a Variety Or Music Program in 1989.

=== Other work ===
In addition to his work on The Simpsons, Meyer wrote, directed, and starred in his own play, Up Your Giggy, which ran for two weeks at a West Hollywood theater in 2002. In 2005, Meyer cowrote the TBS special Earth to America.

== Personal life ==
Meyer is in a relationship with the writer Maria Semple. They lived together during the 1990s and broke up in 1999, but later got back together. Their child, named Poppy Valentina after Valentina Tereshkova, was born in 2003; being a father gave Meyer a "sense of hopefulness". They live in Seattle. Although raised a Catholic, Meyer hated it and later became agnostic. While working at The Simpsons he became an atheist, taking the advice of fellow writer Mike Reiss. He is a gambler, collector of space program memorabilia and practices yoga. Meyer is a fan of the Grateful Dead with Jerry Garcia being the "closest thing in Meyer's life to a spiritual figure." His sister Ann is married to Jon Vitti.

Meyer has a strong interest in the environment and notes that "the only organization that I really care about these days" is Conservation International. In 2005, a newly discovered species of moss frogs from Sri Lanka was named Philautus poppiae after Meyer's daughter Poppy, a tribute to Meyer's and Semple's dedication to the Global Amphibian Assessment.

In 2006 he wrote a comic, cautionary opinion piece about the environment for BBC News. It begins:

Are you a hypocrite? Because I certainly am. I'm an animal lover who wears leather shoes; a vegetarian who can't resist smoked salmon. I badger my friends to see the Al Gore movie, but I also fly on fuel-gulping jets. Great clouds of hypocrisy swirl around me. But even a fraud has feelings. And this summer, I'm feeling uneasy; I'm starting to think that our culture's frenzied and mindless assault on the last shreds of nature may not be the wisest course.

== Film and television credits ==
- Late Night with David Letterman (1982–1984) – writer
- Not Necessarily the News (1983–1986) – writer
- The New Show (1984) – writer
- Saturday Night Live (1985–1987) – writer
- Vanishing America (1986) – co-writer (with Rich Hall)
- The Simpsons (1989–2005) – writer and producer
  - "The Crepes of Wrath" (along with Sam Simon, John Swartzwelder and Jon Vitti) (1990)
  - "Bart vs. Thanksgiving" (1990)
  - "Blood Feud" (1991)
  - "Mr. Lisa Goes to Washington" (1991)
  - "Treehouse of Horror II" (contributor) (1991)
  - "Separate Vocations" (1992)
  - "Homer the Heretic" (1992)
  - "Bart's Inner Child" (1993)
  - "Sunday, Cruddy Sunday" (along with Tom Martin, Brian Scully and Mike Scully) (1999)
  - "Brother's Little Helper" (1999)
  - "Behind the Laughter" (along with Tim Long, Mike Scully, and Matt Selman) (2000)
  - "The Parent Rap" (along with Mike Scully) (2001)
- The Edge (1992–1993) – writer
- A.U.S.A. (2003) – consulting producer
- Complete Savages (2004–2005) – producer
- I Heart Huckabees (2004) – Credited (along with Maria Semple) as "Formal Couple".
- Earth To America (2005) – cowriter
- The Simpsons Movie (2007) – cowriter

== Bibliography ==
- Meyer, George (February 10, 2014). "Major Tom : the NASA investigation". Shouts & Murmurs. The New Yorker. Vol. 89, no. 48. pp. 40–41.

== Sources ==
- Ortved, John (2009). Simpsons Confidential: The uncensored, totally unauthorised history of the world's greatest TV show by the people that made it (UK ed.). Ebury Press. ISBN 978-0-09-192729-5.
- Sacks, Mike (2014). And Here's the Kicker: Conversations with 21 Top Humor Writers. New York: Writers House. ISBN 978-1630640118.
