= David Owen (author) =

American journalist and author (born 1955)

- Born: February 14, 1955 (age 71)
- Education: Colorado College; Harvard University (AB)
- Occupations: Journalist; writer
- Spouse: Ann Hodgman
- Children: 2
- Website: www.davidowen.net

David Owen (born February 14, 1955) is an American journalist and author.

== Education ==
David Owen grew up in Kansas City, Missouri, and graduated from The Pembroke-Country Day School in 1973. He attended Colorado College before transferring to Harvard University, where he was an editor of The Harvard Lampoon, as was his future wife, Ann Hodgman. He graduated from Harvard in 1978 with a degree in English.

== Journalism ==
Owen has been a staff writer for The New Yorker since 1991 and a contributing editor of Golf Digest since 1995; previously he was a contributing editor of The Atlantic Monthly and a senior writer for Harper's Magazine. For six years he was a regular columnist for Home magazine. He was also a contributing editor and columnist for Spy.

Owen won an Alicia Patterson Journalism Fellowship in 1984 to research and write about standardized testing in the American education system.

== Personal life ==
Owen lives in Washington, Connecticut with his wife, Ann Hodgman. They have two adult children, both writers: Laura Hazard Owen and John Bailey Owen.

== Works ==
Books

- High School: Undercover with the Class of '80 (New York: Viking, 1981) ISBN 0670371491
- None of the Above: Behind the Myth of Scholastic Aptitude (pb. subtitle: The Truth Behind the SATs (New YorkL Houghton Mifflin Company, 1985) ISBN 978-0-395-35540-4 ISBN 0-395-35540-0
- The Man Who Invented Saturday Morning: And Other Adventures in American Enterprise (Villard, 1988) ISBN 978-0-394-56810-2 ISBN 0-394-56810-9
- The Walls Around Us: The Thinking Person's Guide to How a House Works (New York: Villard, 1991) ISBN 978-0-394-57824-8 ISBN 0-394-57824-4
- My Usual Game; Adventures in Golf (New York: Villard, 1995) ISBN 0679414878
- (co-editor:) Lure of the Links: Great Golf Stories, an Anthology (New York: Atlantic Monthly Press, 1997) ISBN 978-0-87113-685-5 ISBN 0-87113-685-6
- Around the House: Reflections on Life Under a Roof (pb. title: Life Under a Leaky Roof) (New York Villard, 1998) ISBN 978-0-679-45655-1 ISBN 0-679-45655-4
- The Complete Office Golf (New York: Workman Publishing, 1999) ISBN 978-0-7611-1593-9 ISBN 0761115935
- The Making of the Masters: Clifford Roberts, Augusta National, and Golf's Most Prestigious Tournament (New York: Simon & Schuster, 1999) ISBN 0684867516
- The Chosen One: Tiger Woods and the Dilemma of Greatness (New York: Simon & Schuster, 2001) ISBN 978-0-7432-2234-1 ISBN 0-7432-2234-2
- Hit & Hope: How the Rest of Us Play Golf (New York: Simon & Schuster, 2003) ISBN 0743261461
- The First National Bank of Dad: The Best Way to Teach Kids About Money (pb. subtitle: A Foolproof Method for Teaching Your Kids the Value of Money) (New York: Simon & Schuster, 2003) ISBN 978-0-7432-0480-4 ISBN 0-7432-0480-8
- Copies in Seconds: How a Lone Inventor and an Unknown Company Created the Biggest Communication Breakthrough Since Gutenberg – Chester Carlson and the Birth of Xerox (New York: Simon & Schuster, 2004) ISBN 978-0-7432-5118-1 ISBN 0-7432-5118-0
- Sheetrock and Shellac: A Thinking Person's Guide to the Art and Science of Home Improvement (New York: Simon & Schuster, 2006) ISBN 978-0-7432-5120-4 ISBN 0-7432-5120-2
- Green Metropolis: Why Living Smaller, Living Closer, and Driving Less Are the Keys to Sustainability (New York: Riverhead, 2009) ISBN 9781594484841
- The Conundrum: How Scientific Innovation, Increased Efficiency, and Good Intentions Can Make our Energy and Climate Problems Worse (New York: Riverhead, 2012) ISBN 9781594485619

Essays and reporting

- "Those Who Can't, Consult," Harper's, August 1982,
- "Where Toys Come From," The Atlantic Monthly, October 1986,
- "Travel: Innocents Abroad – Making Britain fun for a child can be fun for a parent, too,"" The Atlantic Monthly, November 1996
- "Notes & Comment: Children and Money – Training a little investor," The Atlantic Monthly, April 1998
- "Life and Letters: From Race to Chase – Yale’s Stephen L. Carter writes a thriller," The New Yorker, June 3, 2002
- "Books: Measure for Measure – How the metric system conquered the world-almost," The New Yorker, October 14, 2002
- "Mom and Pop Dept.: The Hundred Club," The New Yorker, December 23, 2002
- "NASA, Spinning: Was the space shuttle useful? Not really." Slate, posted February 4, 2003
- "The Case for All Male Golf Clubs" Golf Digest, March 2003
- "Shouts & Murmurs: Remake" (plot outline for 2003 remake of It's a Wonderful Life), The New Yorker, April 21, 2003
- "Dept. of Procurement: The Meat Doctor," The New Yorker, June 30, 2003
- "Shouts & Murmurs: A Naturalist’s Notes," The New Yorker, August 11, 2003
- "Shouts & Murmurs: 8 Simple Rules For Dating My Ex-Wife," The New Yorker, January 12, 2004
- "Hey Pal Dept.: Old Hack," The New Yorker, January 26, 2004
- "Our Local Correspondents: Green Manhattan," The New Yorker, October 18, 2004
- "Shouts & Murmurs: Your Three Wishes – F.A.Q.," The New Yorker, January 16, 2006
- "Pencils Up! The S.A.T.’s Watchdog," The New Yorker, April 3, 2006
- "Annals of Culture: The Soundtrack of Your Life – Muzak in the realm of retail theatre," The New Yorker, April 10, 2006
- "Precocity Dept.: Bird," The New Yorker, July 24, 2006
- "Shouts & Murmurs: The Afterlife – Cutting Back," The New Yorker, January 7, 2008
- "Talk of the Town: Here to There Dept.: Wheeling" The New Yorker, December 1, 2008
- "The Talk of the Town: Here to There Dept.: Tornado Man" The New Yorker, November 1, 2010
- "Annals of Health: Hands across America: The Rise of Purell" The New Yorker, March 4, 2013
- "Annals of Disaster: Notes from Underground: Florida's sinkhole peril The New Yorker, March 18, 2013
- "The Yips," The New Yorker, May 26, 2014
- "Subtitling Your Life," The New Yorker, April 21, 2025
