= The Yellow Badge of Cowardge =

- The Simpsons episode
- Episode no.: Season 25; Episode 22
- Directed by: Timothy Bailey
- Written by: Billy Kimball; Ian Maxtone-Graham
- Production code: SABF18
- Original air date: May 18, 2014

Guest appearances
- Glenn Close as Mona Simpson; Edwin Moses as himself

Episode features
- Couch gag: The Simpsons (and Matt Groening) are part of a panel at the San Diego Comic Fest. When The Comic Book Guy asks whether or not there will be another Simpsons movie, everyone except Maggie leaves.

Episode chronology
← Previous "Pay Pal"	Next → "Clown in the Dumps"
- The Simpsons season 25

"The Yellow Badge of Cowardge" is the twenty-second and final episode of the twenty-fifth season of the American animated television series The Simpsons and the 552nd episode of the series. It originally aired on the Fox network in the United States on May 18, 2014. It was written by Billy Kimball and Ian Maxtone-Graham and directed by Timothy Bailey.

In the episode, Bart feels guilty after he wins the annual "last day of school" race around Springfield Elementary School, with help from Nelson, who beats up the frontrunner, Milhouse. Meanwhile, Homer tries to bring back Fourth of July fireworks after they are cancelled due to budget cuts. Glenn Close guest starred as Mona Simpson and Olympian Edwin Moses appeared as himself. The episode received mixed reviews.

== Plot ==
In celebration of the last day of school, Bart wakes up his parents by banging pots and pans together. The family convenes in the kitchen, where Homer discovers, while reading the local newspaper, that the Fourth of July fireworks have been cancelled as the city does not have enough money. Meanwhile, Springfield Elementary hosts their annual Field Day festivities. Milhouse reveals to Bart he has been training for the "Race Around the School" event, but Martin overhears this secret. Martin then wagers his money on Milhouse to win, potentially bankrupting the bullies because of the tremendously long odds against Milhouse.

As each student runs during the race, Milhouse leads the pack before Nelson and the bullies plan to sabotage him. Nelson waits for Milhouse at the pivotal turn of the race, punching him in the head. Bart sees this, but runs ahead of the race to win first place. As Bart is rewarded a blue ribbon for his victory, Milhouse emerges from the bushes, having contracted amnesia. Bart feels guilty and cannot confess the truth to Milhouse, even at a town ceremony honoring his victory. However, when one of the bullies slingshots a rubber band at Milhouse's forehead, he regains his memories and calls out Bart for lying.

The outraged townspeople chase Bart from the ceremony. Bart runs to the retirement home, to seek help from Grandpa, without much luck. Meanwhile, elsewhere, Homer enlists the help of a fireworks operator whom he knew as a child to execute a spectacular fireworks display for the town. On the Fourth of July, a fight breaks out between them as they are about to begin the celebration. The fireworks go awry, yet Bart quickly thinks on his feet to get the town to believe that Milhouse is the modest hero. That night, Bart gives his first place ribbon to Maggie.

== Production ==
This is the final episode of the series written by Billy Kimball and Ian Maxtone-Graham before their departure from the series. Kimball left to become the chief programming officer of Fusion. Maxtone-Graham left to join the television series Man Seeking Woman.

Olympic hurdler Edwin Moses guest starred as a fictionalized version of himself who participated in the Springfield Elementary race. Producer Michael Price, who did not meet Moses, wrote Moses' response to Principal Skinner's question of Moses' "biggest hurdle."

== Reception ==
Dennis Perkins of The A.V. Club gave the episode a C+, saying "After two straight episodes suggesting the enduring potential of The Simpsons, 'The Yellow Badge Of Cowardge' is a return to late-career form right in time for the end of the show's 25th season. Which is to say, it's a middling episode, indifferently constructed, whose chief pleasures come from familiarity and a few decent lines. It's not bad, it's not good—it's an acceptable half hour of television whose very adequacy damns it."

Tony Sokol of Den of Geek gave the episode four out of five stars, saying "The Simpsons 'The Yellow Badge of Cowardge' was a good Springfield episode. The fourth of July is a good time to bring out the town and put them in stupid outfits and working muskets. The episode was funny, it taught a lesson. Probably the wrong lesson, but why quibble? And only Millhouse got hurt, which is probably the point. I also always like when the Simpsons lets Dan Castellaneta improv through songs in the fadeout. Pure unfettered Castellenata [sic]."

The episode received a 1.6 rating and was watched by a total of 3.28 million people, making it the second most watched show on Animation Domination that night.
