= Ann Hodgman =

American author

Ann Hodgman (born 1956) is an American author of more than forty children's books as well as several cookbooks and humor books and many magazine articles.

== Biography ==
Ann Hodgman was raised in Rochester, New York and graduated from Harvard University in 1978. At Harvard, she was a staff member on the Harvard Lampoon and the Harvard Advocate. Between 1978 and 1984, she lived in New York City and worked as a children's book editor for Bantam Books. She and her husband, author David Owen, moved to Washington, Connecticut and in 1988, she had a son.

== Work ==
Hodgman's Beat That! Cookbook (1995), was considered one of the funniest cookbooks the Library Journal had reviewed. How To Die of Embarrassment Every Day (2011) is a children's book and also a memoir of her life up to the sixth grade.
