= The Color Yellow =

- The Simpsons episode
- Episode no.: Season 21; Episode 13
- Directed by: Raymond S. Persi
- Written by: Ian Maxtone-Graham and Billy Kimball
- Production code: MABF06
- Original air date: February 21, 2010

Guest appearance
- Wren T. Brown as Virgil

Episode features
- Couch gag: Repeat of the couch gag from "Father Knows Worst".

Episode chronology
← Previous "Boy Meets Curl"	Next → "Postcards from the Wedge"
- The Simpsons season 21

"The Color Yellow" is the thirteenth episode of the twenty-first season of the American animated television series The Simpsons. It originally aired on the Fox network in the United States on February 21, 2010. In this episode, Lisa discovers that her ancestors from Florida helped a black slave named Virgil escape to freedom, but Milhouse has a piece of family history that shows Lisa's ancestors giving Virgil up in an act of cowardice.

The episode was written by Ian Maxtone-Graham and Billy Kimball and directed by Raymond S. Persi. It guest starred Wren T. Brown as Virgil.

The episode was viewed by 6.08 million viewers and received mixed to positive reviews.

== Plot ==
While working on a genealogy assignment, Lisa discovers a diary written by her great-great-great grandaunt, Eliza Simpson. She reads it, hoping to discover a Simpson in her family tree that was not an alcoholic, criminal, or sexual fetishist. At first she believes through reading the diary that, to her dismay, Eliza was a slaveowner, but she soon learns that she and her mother Mabel were part of the Underground Railroad in 1860. Eliza sneaks into a ball hosted by Colonel Burns (later said to be the father of Monty Burns, again making fun of his age) to meet a slave named Virgil, but as the two make their escape, they are spotted by a mounted patrol. Unfortunately, the diary is too disintegrated for Lisa to read on, and she cannot bear not knowing if Virgil escaped.

Lisa and Marge discover a cookbook at the local library written by Mabel, made decades after Eliza saved Virgil. In it is an anecdote that tells how Eliza and Virgil evaded capture by donning disguises at a traveling circus with a Krusty-type clown. They make it back to the Simpson household, but Eliza's father Hiram is suspicious of Virgil's presence. Virgil makes him "wheel cakes" and Hiram swears to keep Virgil's whereabouts a secret. As the story continues on, it becomes like The Color Purple.

Lisa believes Eliza to be a hero for helping Virgil escape, and tells this story at a Black History Month presentation at Springfield Elementary. Milhouse, however, challenges her story and suggests that Eliza was a coward. He reads from the journal of his ancestor, Milford Van Houten, who witnessed Colonel Burns bribe Hiram with "a pleasant surprise", a new pair of shoes in exchange for giving up Virgil. Eliza does not stand up against the Colonel and Lisa is crushed to think her ancestor was indeed a coward. Milford said he was so disgusted he could never look at Eliza again (Milhouse adding it did not help that he went blind the next day after drinking bad well water). Milford Van Houten's account is substantiated when Lisa views a 1950s oral history archival film interview with an elderly Eliza, where she indicates this cowardice as being the one regret of her life. In the film, a wedding portrait behind Eliza shows she married Milford Van Houten, thus creating a family link between the Simpsons and the Van Houtens and making Bart, Lisa, Maggie, and Milhouse distant cousins.

To help raise Lisa's spirits, Homer threatens Grampa Simpson to get him to tell the rest of the story by turning the thermostat down a few degrees. Grandpa Simpson then tells how Mabel threatened to castrate Colonel Burns with a shotgun blast and then escaped with Virgil to Canada. There, she divorced Hiram and married Virgil. She also got one shoe from Hiram, but he kept the shoelaces to himself. Grampa reveals that Virgil and Mabel's son Abraham was his great-grandfather, and therefore Bart, Lisa, and Maggie (actually descended from Virgil and not Hiram) are 1/64th black, to which Lisa then claims is the reason for her jazz musical ability, Bart believes that it is the reason for him being so cool, and Homer sees as why he makes less money than his white co-workers. Grampa also admits that the reason why he kept this secret was due to the fact that people during his generation were racist at that time. Marge then notes that her father was French, to which Homer claims as the cause of his drinking, and drinks wine from a bottle. Marge points out that he is not of French ancestry, but Homer dismisses this and continues drinking while the French national anthem is played in the background.

== Reception ==
In its original American broadcast, "The Color Yellow" was watched by 6.08 million households getting a 3.0/8 in the 18-49 Nielsen Rating, and was the second most-watched show on Fox that night, after a repeat of Family Guy and came second in its time slot after the 2010 Winter Olympics. The show ranked 19 in the 18-49 weekly ratings ranking 4th on FOX for the rating after Family Guy and American Idol Wednesday and Tuesday.

Robert Canning of IGN gave the episode a 6.4 writing that it "as a whole fell flat" and commented: "I guess it's difficult to find the humor in slavery, even for The Simpsons".

Emily VanDerWerff of The A.V. Club gave the episode a C+, saying that "there was some funny stuff" but "the majority of the episode was a disappointment".

Jason Hughes of TV Squad gave "The Color Yellow" a positive review stating that "there were some great comedic moments in tonight's episode".
