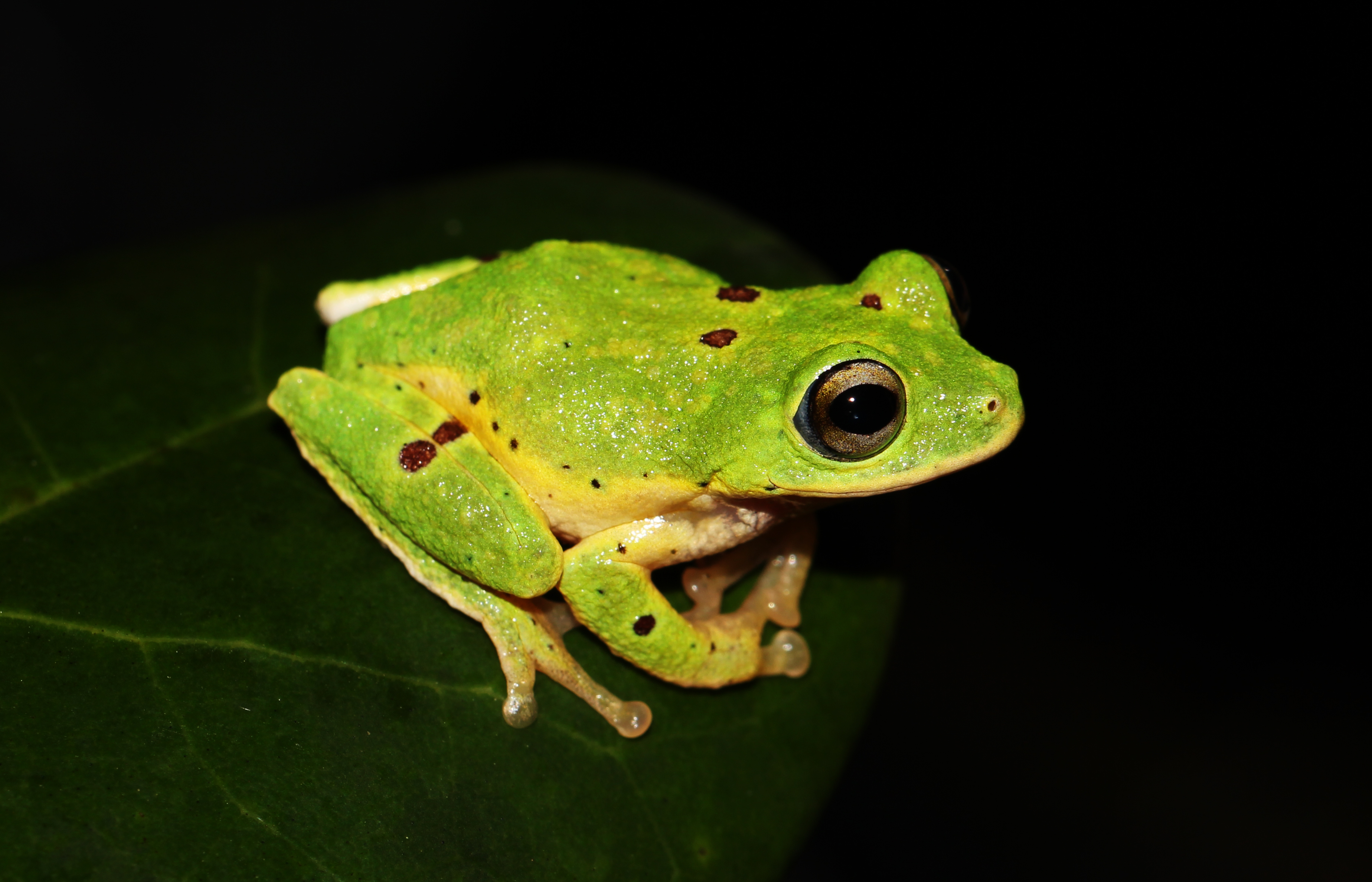

Conservation status
- Critically Endangered (IUCN 3.1)

Scientific classification
- Kingdom: Animalia
- Phylum: Chordata
- Class: Amphibia
- Order: Anura
- Family: Rhacophoridae
- Genus: Pseudophilautus
- Species: P. poppiae

Binomial name
- Pseudophilautus poppiae (Meegaskumbura & Manamendra-Arachchi, 2005)

Synonyms
- Philautus poppiae Meegaskumbura & Manamendra-Arachchi, 2005

= Pseudophilautus poppiae =

Species of amphibian

Pseudophilautus poppiae, also known as Poppy's shrub frog, is a species of frog in the family Rhacophoridae. It is endemic to Sri Lanka. Its natural habitat is subtropical or tropical moist montane forests.Scientists have seen it between 1060 and 1270 meters above sea level.

The adult male frog measures 21.3 – 24.7 mm in snout-vent length and the adult female frog about 26.0 mm long. The top and sides of the head are bright, luminous green in color. Some of these frogs have red spots on their backs, but most have black spots. The flanks are yellow in color. The middle of the body and the tops of the hind legs are yellow-brown in color. Parts of the mouth are yellow or white in color. The tops of the front legs are yellow green-yellow in color. There are white stripes on the outer edges of the front legs. The inner sides of the front legs are yellow. The belly is yellow.

This frog is strictly arboreal. It lives in cloud forests where the tree branches form a closed canopy. It lives in the lower branches and in shrubs. People have seen the male frogs sitting on plants 1–3 m above the ground. This frog can also live in lightly planted cardamom plots.

Scientists named this frog for Poppy Valentina Meyer because both her parents supported the Global Amphibian Assessment.

Like other frogs in Pseudophilautus, P. poppiae undergoes direct development, hatching as a froglet with no free-swimming tadpole stage.

It is threatened by habitat loss. Scientists cite urbanization, grazing, and logging.

== Original description ==
- Meegaskumbura M; Manamendra-Arachchi K (2005). "Description of eight new species of shrub frogs (Ranidae: Rhacophorinae: Philautus) from Sri Lanka". Raffles Bull Zool Suppl. 12: 305–338.
