= Patty Rosborough =

- Occupation: Comedian
- Known for: Stand-up comedy Short Attention Span Theater
- Website: pattyrosborough.com

Patty Rosborough is an American stand-up comedian, actor, and television writer. From 1990 to 1993, she co-hosted Short Attention Span Theater with Jon Stewart. Her stand-up comedy has been televised on Comedy Central, A&E, Showtime, and VH1. Her film credits include minor roles in Jacob's Ladder (1990) and Goodbye Baby (2007).

Rosborough has appeared on the stand-up comedy television series The World Stands Up, and headlined at Just for Laughs, an international comedy festival in Montreal. In 2000, she and Tammy Pescatelli won Ladies of Laughter, a stand-up comedy competition hosted in the Northeastern United States.
