= Comedy Central (CIS and Georgia) =

Former Russian comedy television channel owned by Paramount Networks EMEAA

- Country: United Kingdom
- Broadcast area: Russia (2012–2022); Belarus (2012–2022); Moldova; Georgia; Armenia; Azerbaijan; Kazakhstan; Uzbekistan; Kyrgyzstan (subtitles); Tajikistan; Turkmenistan
- Headquarters: London, UK

Programming
- Picture format: 16:9 576i SDTV

Ownership
- Owner: Paramount Networks EMEAA

History
- Launched: 1 April 2012; 14 years ago (Russia)
- Closed: 28 April 2022; 4 years ago (Russia); 14 December 2022; 3 years ago (Belarus); 1 January 2026; 10 months ago (CIS)
- Former names: Paramount Comedy (2012–2023)

Links
- Website: paramountcomedy.ru (closed)

Comedy Central (formerly Paramount Comedy) was a Russian cable television and satellite television comedy channel available in Russia (until 28 April 2022) and CIS countries, launched in 2012 as Paramount Comedy. It is owned by CBS Networks Television Inc. and Paramount Skydance Corporation.

== History ==
Comedy Central was launched in Russia in 2012, originally under the name Paramount Comedy. This was the name initially used for international versions of Comedy Central during the late 1990s and early 2000s, although it began to get retired during the late 2000s and early 2010s. Since 2014, the channel was one of the last to retain the Paramount Comedy branding, with all of the previous Paramount Comedy channels having already been rebranded as Comedy Central.

In mid-March 2022, due to the invasion of Ukraine, Paramount, which owns the MTV brand, decided to suspend its activities in Russia. Initially, the Paramount Comedy channel (along with all other TV channels of this company) planned to stop broadcasting in Russia on April 20, but eventually broadcasting was discontinued on April 28. In the Commonwealth of Independent States (CIS), as well as Georgia, the broadcasting of Russian-language version of this and other Paramount channels is continuing.

On 14 December 2022, Paramount Comedy ceased broadcasting in Belarus.

On 1 February 2023, the TV channel's website shutdown.

On 1 March 2023, both the Russian and Ukrainian versions of Paramount Comedy were renamed to Comedy Central.

At the end of 2023, the Comedy Central completely refused to translate new episodes of the South Park.

On January 1 2024, series from third-party studios were removed from the network due to the expiration of licenses for them, and most Nickelodeon's animated series were also removed.

On November 18 2024, the channel design was changed.

The channel closed on 1 January 2026.

== Programming ==
- Awkward
- Awkwafina Is Nora from Queens
- Beavis and Butt-Head
- Becker
- Broad City
- Frasier
- Key & Peele
- The King of Queens
- trink trink the train
- Reno 911!
- Workaholics
- Aaahh!!! Real Monsters
- The Big Bang Theory
- CatDog
- Crank Yankers
- Daria
- Dharma & Greg
- The Adventures Of Jimmy Neutron: Boy Genius
- Friends
- Hey Arnold!
- How I Met Your Mother
- It's Always Sunny in Philadelphia
- Last Man Standing
- Malcolm in the Middle
- The Middle
- Modern Family
- Mom
- Raising Hope
- The Ren & Stimpy Show
- Ridiculousness
- Rugrats
- Jungle Junction
- Супермаркет
- Takeshi's Castle Indonesia
- Two Guys and a Girl
- Ugly Americans
