= Home (magazine) =

US magazine

Home Magazine was a magazine published in the United States by Hachette Filipacchi Media U.S.

== History and profile ==
Home was founded in 1981 and concluded publication with the October 2008 issue. The magazine appeared eight times a year and had a circulation of one million. In 2007 Olivia Monjo was appointed the editor-in-chief of the magazine. Its website, PointClickHome.com, continued updating until 2009.
