= The New Show =

Television series (1984)

- Country of origin: United States
- No. of episodes: 9 (+1 "Best Of" Special)

Production
- Running time: 1 hour

Original release
- Network: NBC
- Release: January 6 – March 23, 1984

The New Show is an NBC sketch comedy show produced by Lorne Michaels that ran for one season from January 6 to March 23, 1984. Apart from being 60 minutes in length and entirely pre-recorded, the show is similar in format to Michaels' own Saturday Night Live. It was the lowest-rated of 94 programs that aired during the 1983–84 television season, averaging a 7.81 household rating. It was scheduled opposite Matt Houston and Falcon Crest.

The show was Michaels' second network television show created after Saturday Night Live. Several former original cast members and hosts from SNL's 1970s era made appearances throughout the series' short run, including Laraine Newman, Gilda Radner, Steve Martin, and Buck Henry. After NBC cancelled The New Show, Michaels would return to SNL as executive producer in 1985.

== Cast ==
- Valri Bromfield
- Buck Henry
- Dave Thomas

== Writers ==
Michaels brought a lot of the Saturday Night Live crew with him for The New Show, including many of the writers from the 1979–80 season. In addition to himself, Michaels hired former SNL writers Tom Davis, Al Franken, Tom Gammill, Sarah Paley, Max Pross, and Alan Zweibel, along with Jim Downey, who Michaels made head writer. Michaels took Gammill, Pross, Downey, and George Meyer away from the staff of Late Night with David Letterman, where Downey also served as head writer. Valri Bromfield, Buck Henry, and Dave Thomas all served as writers in addition to their duties as cast members. Bill Murray's younger brother, John Murray, was hired to the writing staff. A lot of the New Show followed Michaels when he returned to take the reins of Saturday Night Live for the 1985 season, including Jack Handey, Meyer, Franken and Davis (whom he made producers), and Downey (whom he made head writer).

Head Writer:

- Jim Downey

Staff Writers:

- Valri Bromfield
- Tom Davis
- Al Franken
- Tom Gammill
- Jack Handey
- Buck Henry
- George Meyer
- Lorne Michaels
- John Murray
- Sarah Paley
- Max Pross
- Dave Thomas
- Alan Zweibel

== American television ratings ==
Season	Episodes	Start date	End date	Nielsen rank	Nielsen rating
1983–84	9	January 6, 1984	March 23, 1984	99	7.9

== Episodes ==
#	Original airdate	Guest stars	Musical guest	Also appearing	Sketches
1	January 6, 1984	Steve Martin; Jeff Goldblum; Catherine O'Hara	New Edition	Maggie Jakobson; G.E. Smith	"Billie Jean" music video takeoff (Martin, DT); Teacher's lounge and talent show tryouts (Goldblum, VB, DT, Smith, Jakobson); Statement of Principles for The New Show (Martin); Weekend Tonight (BH, DT, plus DT as Bob Hope); 1984 takeoff (everyone); Joy Behar – Make Me Laugh Part I (film segment); I've...been...drugged (Martin, O'Hara, Goldblum)
2	January 13, 1984	John Candy; Carrie Fisher	Paul Simon	Maggie Jakobson; Maura Moynihan; James Downey	Ruth Gordon and Orson Welles (VB, Candy); Why don't you check on the baby? (Fisher); Paul Simon performs "Hearts and Bones"; Mountain Mike (DT, Simon, Candy); Time Truck (everyone); Andropov faking illness (everyone); Weekend Tonight (BH, DT, Candy as Luciano Pavarotti); Paul Simon debuts music video for "Rene and Georgette Magritte with Their Dog after the War"; Roy's Food Repair (everyone)
3	January 20, 1984	Kevin Kline; Gilda Radner; John Candy	David Johansen	Maggie Jakobson; Maura Moynihan	Opening with DT introducing cast (BH, VB); Gilda with her dog (also with DT); Introducing Kevin Kline and John Candy; The Hustler (Kline, Candy, DT, BH, other extras); Good mailman, bad mailman (Radner, DT, Candy, VB); Olympic moment (Kline and Radner as skaters without skates); The Hustler contd Weekend Tonight (BH, DT, Candy as John Madden, DT as Liberace, Candy as Big Boy); Buster Poindexter and the Banshees of Blues (Johansen); The Hustler contd Den of Revulsion (ewwwww!) (VB, Radner, BH, Kline, Candy, DT); The Muensters (primetime soap takeoff) (everyone)
4	February 3, 1984	Raul Julia; Penny Marshall	Randy Newman	Maggie Jakobson; Tom Davis	Restaurant of Revulsion (ewwwww!) (VB, DT, Marshall, BH, Julia); Penny Marshall does breakdancing with The Dynamic Breakers; Walter Cronkite's World of Bloopers (DT, Marshall); Randy Newman performs Scarface takeoff (everyone); Weekend Tonight (BH, DT, Marshall, VB, plus DT as Olivier); Trivial Pursuit (Marshall, DT, VB, Newman); Maggie Jakobson does black cheerleaders Randy Newman music video: "I Love L.A."; Zorka The Moth (Marshall, Julia)
5	February 10, 1984	Randy Quaid; Dennis Quaid; Catherine O'Hara	John Cougar Mellencamp	N/A	Buck Henry's Bikini Theater; Commandos From Hell (Quaids); The Frightened Family (with DT, VB, O'Hara, BH); Mental Telepathy (with Dennis Quaid, O'Hara, DT, BH, VB); Weekend Tonight (with BH and DT, O'Hara as Wendy O. Williams); Sister and her pranking brothers (Quaids, O'Hara); The Naughty Lady (Quaids, VB, BH, O'Hara, DT); World of Nature (BH, O'Hara); Joy Behar – Make Me Laugh Part II (film segment)
6	February 17, 1984	Steve Martin; Catherine O'Hara	Cyndi Lauper	Maggie Jakobson; Tom Davis; Maura Moynihan	Jim McKay at the Olympics (DT, VB); Steve Martin asks "What Kind of Guy Watches the New Show?"; Couple seeing the doctor about "going unconscious" (DT, O'Hara, BH); Steve Martin as Italian gigolo (also with O'Hara); Cyndi Lauper performs New York Daily Bugle (Martin, O'Hara, BH, DT); Weekend Tonight (BH, DT, O'Hara as Julie Andrews, DT as Boy George); Problem with extras (everyone); New employee (DT, BH, Moynihan); Cyndi Lauper performs Film segment: "The Day Before"
7	March 9, 1984	Candice Bergen; Steve Guttenberg	Rick James	Maggie Jakobson; Tom Davis; Al Franken; Maura Moynihan	Going to Work (VB); Let's Make a Deal for doing the show (BH, Bergen, Guttenberg); Campaign Trail of Blood (DT, Guttenberg, BH); Vacationers forgot their camera (Bergen, BH); Smooth-talking Jeb avoids a lynching (Guttenberg, Davis, Franken, BH, DT, Jakobson); Weekend Tonight (BH, DT, also DT as Ed Koch); Chip Masters: Organ Donor (Moynihan, BH, VB, Guttenberg, Davis, DT); Menudo mockumentary Rick James
8	March 16, 1984	Laraine Newman; John Candy	Laurie Anderson	Maggie Jakobson; Tom Davis; Al Franken	Buck insists it is a live audience (BH, Newman, Candy); Asian convenience store clerk (DT, Candy); Ping pong scene being filmed (Candy, BH, Davis, Franken); The Frightened Family (BH, DT, Candy, Newman, VB); Weekend Tonight (BH, DT, plus DT as Michael Caine, Candy as Tip O'Neill); Twilight Zonettes (everyone); Desiree Silver's Film Talk (Jakobson, Newman, Candy, VB)
9	March 23, 1984	Teri Garr	The Pretenders	Maggie Jakobson; Maura Moynihan; Tom Davis; Al Franken	Buck speaks of cast as family (BH, Garr, Thomas); Union Scabs meeting (BH, Thomas, Franken, Davis, others); Floont Artney (BH, Thomas); Dave's evil brother Bill tangles with Buck, Teri, and audience (BH, Garr, Thomas); The Pretenders; Mr. Grandmom (Thomas, Garr, Bromfield); Weekend Tonight (BH, Thomas, plus Davis and Garr); Terri Garr hands out samples in supermarket (everyone); The Pretenders; Where's the beef? themed wedding (everyone)

1984 - s01e10 - Best Of (Special)
