= Jack Handey =

American humorist and writer (born 1949)

- Born: February 25, 1949 (age 77); San Antonio, Texas, U.S.
- Spouse: Marta Chavez

Comedy career
- Years active: 1980–present
- Medium: Television; print
- Genres: Surreal humor; one-liners; deadpan
- Website: deepthoughtsbyjackhandey.com

Jack Handey (born February 25, 1949) is an American humorist. He is best known for his "Deep Thoughts by Jack Handey", a large body of surrealistic one-liner jokes featured on Saturday Night Live, as well as his "Fuzzy Memories" and "My Big Thick Novel" shorts, and for his deadpan delivery. Although many assume otherwise, Handey is a real person, not a pen name or character.

== Early life ==
Handey was born in San Antonio, Texas, in 1949. He graduated from Eastwood High School in El Paso, Texas, where he was the editor of the school newspaper, Sabre.

== Career ==
Handey's earliest writing job was for a newspaper, the San Antonio Express-News. He lost the job after writing an article that, in his words, "offended local car dealerships". His first comic writing was with comedian Steve Martin. According to Martin, Handey got a job writing for Saturday Night Live (SNL) after Martin introduced him to the show's creator, Lorne Michaels. For several years, Handey worked on other television projects: the Canadian sketch series Bizarre in 1980, the 1980 Steve Martin television special Comedy Is Not Pretty!, and Lorne Michaels's short-lived sketch show on NBC called The New Show in 1984. Handey returned to Saturday Night Live in 1985 as a writer.

=== "Deep Thoughts" ===
Handey's "deep thoughts" were first published in an untitled essay in Omni magazine in November 1983. In April 1984, National Lampoon published a piece titled "Deep Thoughts". Additional Deep Thoughts appeared in the October and November 1984 editions, as well as in the short-lived Army Man comedy magazine, while more appeared in 1988 in The Santa Fe New Mexican newspaper. The one-liners were to become Handey's signature work, notable for their concise humor and outlandish hypothetical situations. For example:

- If trees could scream, would we be so cavalier about cutting them down? We might, if they screamed all the time, for no good reason.
- The crows seemed to be calling his name, thought Caw.

Handey's work next showed up in the Michael Nesmith-produced TV series Television Parts in the format which later became famous on Saturday Night Live (though in Television Parts, Nesmith provided the narration). Some of these segments appeared in the compilation video of that program, Doctor Duck's Super Secret All-Purpose Sauce.

Between 1989 and 1990, Deep Thoughts were shown during commercial breaks on The Comedy Channel with Handey's narration.

Between 1991 and 1998, Saturday Night Live included Deep Thoughts on the show as an interstitial segment (between sketches). Introduced by Phil Hartman and read live by Handey (neither actually appeared on screen), the one-liners proved to be extremely popular. Hartman intoned "And now, Deep Thoughts, by Jack Handey...", and peaceful easy listening music played while the screen showed soothing pastoral scenes, much like a New Age relaxation video. Handey then read the Deep Thought as the text to it scrolled across the screen. They became an enduring feature of SNL, which often had multiple Thoughts in each episode, and made Handey a well-known name.

=== Other SNL work ===
Other Handey creations that appeared on SNL include Unfrozen Caveman Lawyer, "Fuzzy Memories" which depicted reenactments of a twisted childhood memory and aired in the late 1990s, and the short-lived "My Big Thick Novel", which were spoken excerpts from a very long book in the style of "Deep Thoughts" and which aired during SNL's 2001–03 seasons.

Handey is also credited with creating Toonces the Driving Cat, the cat who could drive a car, although not very well. The recurring skit originated in 1989 with Steve Martin and Victoria Jackson as the crash-prone kitten's owners. In 1992 NBC aired a half-hour Toonces special. Handey, who lived with a real cat by the same name, once said he could not remember exactly how he dreamed up the premise. He said, "It was just one of those free association ideas you write down and look at later and think, 'Maybe.'"

=== Further writing ===
In early April 2008, Handey published his first collection of magazine humor pieces, What I'd Say to the Martians and Other Veiled Threats. Associated Press critic Jake Coyle wrote, "With absurdist musings such as these, Handey has established himself as the strangest of birds: a famous comedian whose platform is not the stage or screen, but the page." Handey subsequently became a regular contributor to The New Yorker Shouts and Murmurs section.

On July 16, 2013, Handey's first novel, The Stench of Honolulu, was released by publisher Grand Central.

== Personal life ==
Handey and his wife, Marta Chavez Handey, live in Santa Fe, New Mexico. Previously, the Handeys had lived in the Chelsea neighborhood of Manhattan, New York City.

== Bibliography ==
=== Books ===
- Deep thoughts: inspiration for the uninspired (1992) Berkley, ISBN 9780425133651
- Deeper thoughts: all new, all crispy (1993) Hyperion ISBN 1-56282-840-1
- Deepest Thoughts: So Deep they Squeak (1994). Hyperion, ISBN 0-7868-8044-9
- Fuzzy Memories (1996). Andrews McMeel Publishing, ISBN 0-8362-1040-9 – a collection of "stories from Handey's childhood"
  - Fuzzy Memories: CD-Rom (2003). Disc Us Books Inc, ISBN 1-58444-078-3 - An Emersa*Plus Reader/Viewer E-book that contains all of the text and pictures from the original book plus "new memories," 28 videos of "Jack's home movies", and 60 audio files of Jack reading selected stories.
- The Lost Deep Thoughts: Don't Fight the Deepness (1998), Hyperion, ISBN 0-7868-8305-7
- What I'd Say to the Martians and Other Veiled Threats (2008), Hyperion, ISBN 978-1-4013-2266-3
- The Stench of Honolulu: A Tropical Adventure (2013), Grand Central, ISBN 978-1-4555-2238-5
- Please Stop the Deep Thoughts (2017), Berkley, ISBN 978-0-692-38541-8
- Escape from Hawaii: A Tropical Sequel (2023)

=== Essays and reporting ===
- Handey, Jack (November 24, 2008). "The plan". Shouts & Murmurs. The New Yorker. 84 (38): 62.
- — (July 22, 2013). "Guards' complaints about Spartacus". Shouts & Murmurs. The New Yorker. 89 (21): 33.
- — (October 21, 2013). "Luau". Shouts & Murmurs. The New Yorker. 89 (33): 39.
- — (May 4, 2015). "Execution days". Shouts & Murmurs. The New Yorker. 91 (11): 33.
- — (August 3, 2015). "Apocalypse". Shouts & Murmurs. The New Yorker. 91 (22): 29.
- — (April 2, 2018). "How the neighborhood has changed". Shouts & Murmurs. The New Yorker. 94 (7): 37.
- — (May 30, 2022). "My torture ideas". Shouts & Murmurs. The New Yorker. 98 (14): 25. (Note: Title in the online table of contents is "Coming up with torture ideas is harder than you think".)

———————

== Television writing ==
- Steve Martin: Comedy Is Not Pretty! (1980)
- Prime Times (1983)
- The New Show (1984)
- Television Parts Home Companion (1985) - sequel to Elephant Parts by Michael Nesmith)
- Doctor Duck's Super Secret All-Purpose Sauce (1986) - another sequel to Elephant Parts by Michael Nesmith
- Saturday Night Live (1985–1998 and 2001–2002)
- Quote "I want to die peacefully in my sleep like my grandfather, not screaming in terror like his passengers" is used in the intro of the Adam McKay-directed movie Don't Look Up.
