= Ha! (TV channel) =

American television channel

- Ha! logo designed by Noel Frankel, Fred/Alan, Inc., New York. Illustrated by Lou Brooks.
- Country: United States

Programming
- Language: English

Ownership
- Owner: Viacom
- Parent: MTV Networks
- Sister channels: Lifetime; MTV; Nickelodeon; Showtime; The Movie Channel; VH1

History
- Launched: April 1, 1990; 36 years ago
- Closed: April 1, 1991; 35 years ago (1 year, 0 days)
- Replaced by: Comedy Central

Ha!: TV Comedy Network (commonly known as Ha!) was an American pay television channel owned by Viacom; it was one of the first American all-comedy channels available in basic-tier television offers. Launched on April 1, 1990, at 7 p.m. ET, it competed with another startup comedy-oriented cable channel, HBO-owned The Comedy Channel. In 1991, the two channels merged to form Comedy Central.

== Background ==
MTV Networks had carved out a niche for itself in the cable programming industry throughout the 1980s, thanks to the success of flagship networks MTV and Nickelodeon. Up until the launch of Ha!, there had been only one instance of competition among genres in the industry: that of Ted Turner launching a rival to MTV, the Cable Music Channel, which was short-lived and had its channel space acquired by Viacom to use for an older-skewing MTV counterpart, VH1. Research had constantly encouraged management that a channel strictly dedicated to comedy programming would be profitable, motivating MTV to forge ahead with plans for a comedy channel. When HBO announced the launch of The Comedy Channel, MTV Networks retaliated by announcing the debut of its own rival channel, Ha!

== Programming ==
Unlike The Comedy Channel, which focused on stand-up comedy specials and clips of classic comedy feature films, Ha!'s programming centered largely on acquired off-network situation comedies from the 1950s to the 1970s. Some cable providers, particularly those owned by Viacom or Cablevision, carried the channel under a channel-share agreement in which it would be aired on the same channel space as fellow Viacom-owned cable network VH1; Ha! would air for half of the day, with the channel turning over to VH1 afterward. Programing included Caesar's Hour, in half-hour segments with Sid Caesar intros, The Steve Allen Show, also edited to a half-hour format with 1990 reflections taped by Allen, You Bet Your Life, The Jack Benny Program, the 1960–67 CBS network prime time version of Candid Camera, The Phil Silvers Show, and Car 54, Where Are You?.

The channel name was culled by MTV Networks from a list of 400 possible suggestions by branding agency Fred/Alan, Inc., New York, whose creative team created the logo, branding, advertising, and was the primary consultant on the on-air promotion. As with other channels owned by MTV Networks, the logo was designed in an approach that gave it many variations, each with a different illustrative approach.

In late 1990, with costs on both sides of the competitive equation struggling to meet the limited needs of cable systems' even limited capacity, HBO and Viacom agreed to merge their respective comedy channels. Ha! and Comedy Channel combined to create CTV: The Comedy Network, which began airing on April 1, 1991; prior to the merger, both channels each had fewer than 10 million subscribers. Because of confusion and possible legal issues with the Canadian-based CTV network, the name of the network was subsequently changed to Comedy Central. The name "Comedy Partners, Inc." appears on the end credits of all shows produced by the new channel. In 2003, Viacom bought out Time Warner's half of the network, which had belonged to HBO, which operated The Comedy Channel. Despite this, the "Comedy Partners, Inc." byline still appears on shows produced by the channel today, which is owned by Viacom successor Paramount Skydance.

=== Original programming ===
- Access America (December 7, 1990–1991)
- Afterdrive (November 1, 1990–1991)
- The Big Room
- Clash!
- Comics Only (December 31, 1990–1991)
- London Underground
- Random Acts of Variety

=== Acquired programming ===
- The Abbott and Costello Show (October–December 1990)
- All Is Forgiven
- The Associates
- The Bad News Bears
- The Best of Groucho
- The Betty White Show
- Best of the West (April–November 1990)
- Bob & Carol & Ted & Alice (September 1990)
- Bridget Loves Bernie
- Camp Runamuck
- Candid Camera
- Captain Nice
- Car 54, Where Are You?
- The Charmings
- C.P.O. Sharkey (April–December 1990)
- The Duck Factory
- Fractured Flickers
- Fresno (June–July 1990)
- The Jack Benny Program
- Laurel and Hardy
- Love, American Style
- The Lucy Show
- Mad Movies with the L.A. Connection
- McHale's Navy
- Mork & Mindy
- Occasional Wife
- The Phil Silvers Show
- Phyllis
- Quark
- Rhoda
- Saturday Night Live
- SCTV
- The Steve Allen Show
- Tabitha (June–October 1990)
- The Texas Wheelers (April–November 1990)
- That Girl
- The Tim Conway Show (May–June 1990)
- The Tony Randall Show
- TV's Bloopers & Practical Jokes
- When Things Were Rotten
- Whose Line Is It Anyway?
- Working Stiffs
- Your Show of Shows
