= Comedy Central =

American comedy cable and satellite television channel

- Logo used since 2018
- Country: United States
- Broadcast area: Nationwide
- Headquarters: 345 Hudson Street; New York City, U.S. 10014

Programming
- Languages: English; Spanish (via SAP audio track)
- Picture format: 1080p HDTV

Ownership
- Owner: Time Warner Entertainment (50%) (1991–2003); Skydance TV (Skydance Corporation)
- Parent: Skydance Global Cable Media
- Sister channels: List of sister channels

History
- Launched: April 1, 1991; 35 years ago
- Replaced: The Comedy Channel; Ha! (Comedy Central is a merger of the two formerly separate channels)
- Former names: The Comedy Channel (1989–1991); Ha! (1990–1991); CTV: The Comedy Network (1991)

Links
- Website: cc.com

Availability

Streaming media
- Affiliated Streaming Service: Paramount+ Pluto TV (Note: Contains a 24/7 network, airing Comedy Central shows (such as Reno 911!, Drunk History, Daria, and South Park), as well as a 24/7 South Park Channel (available in different territories))
- Service(s): DirecTV Stream, FuboTV, Hulu + Live TV, Philo, Sling TV, YouTube TV

Comedy Central is an American basic cable television channel owned by Skydance Corporation. Launched on April 1, 1991 and based in Manhattan, New York City, it broadcasts comedy programming in the form of original, licensed and syndicated television series, stand-up comedy specials, and feature films. The channel’s prime target demographic is more mature audiences.

As of November 2023, Comedy Central is available to approximately 68 million pay television households in the United States, down from its 2011 peak of 99 million households.

== History ==
=== 1989–1991: The Comedy Channel and Ha! ===
On November 15, 1989, Time-Life, the original owners of HBO, launched The Comedy Channel as the first cable channel devoted exclusively to comedy-based programming. On April 1, 1990, Viacom (who owned MTV, VH1, Showtime, and Nickelodeon) launched a rival channel called Ha! that featured reruns of situation comedies and some original sketch comedy.

The Comedy Channel's programs were broadcast from the HBO Downtown Studios at 120 East 23rd Street in Manhattan. The format prior to the merger with Ha! included several original and unconventional programs such as Onion World with Rich Hall and Mystery Science Theater 3000, as well as laid-back variety/talk shows hosted by comedians, including The Sweet Life with Rachel Sweet, Night After Night with Allan Havey, Sports Monster, and The Higgins Boys and Gruber, the latter of whom performed sketches in between showings of vintage television series like Supercar, Clutch Cargo, and Lancelot Link, Secret Chimp.

The standard format for The Comedy Channel's shows usually involved the various hosts introducing clips culled from the acts of stand-up comedians as well as classic comedies of the 1970s and 1980s, such as Young Frankenstein and Kentucky Fried Movie, presented in a style similar to music videos. In the early days, certain hours of the day when clips were shown without "host segments" were dubbed Short Attention Span Theater. In 1990, hosts under this title, Jon Stewart and Patty Rosborough, were introduced. Comedian Marc Maron also hosted the series.

While The Comedy Channel broadcast mostly low-budget original programming, Ha!'s schedule featured sitcom and sketch comedy reruns (many of which had been previously licensed for sister network Nick at Nite) as well as complete 90-minute reruns of Saturday Night Live from the sixth through 16th seasons.

After two years of limited distribution, the two channels merged into one, relaunching on April 1, 1991, as CTV: The Comedy Network. On June 1, 1991, the network changed its name to Comedy Central to prevent issues with the Canadian broadcast television network CTV, which would eventually be its Canadian content partner through The Comedy Network when that channel started operations six years later.

Comedy Partners was originally a partnership of Home Box Office, Inc., the subsidiary of Time Warner that owned The Comedy Channel and HBO's half and Viacom Hearty Ha! Ha! LLC, the subsidiary that owned Ha! and Viacom's half of the network during its first years on air. Viacom bought out AOL Time Warner's half in April 2003 for $1.23 billion. Despite HBO's exit from the venture, the Paramount Media Networks division in charge of Comedy Central is still called Comedy Partners, currently being a partnership between Viacom International, copyright holder of the company's assets and Viacom Hearty Ha! Ha! LLC, the subsidiary that owned Ha! and Viacom's original half of the network.

=== 1991–2000 ===
From the late 1980s through the mid-1990s, much of the programming on Comedy Central and its predecessors consisted of comedy films, sitcom reruns, half-hour comedy specials, and clip shows featuring top comedians. With the exception for the cult favorite Mystery Science Theater 3000, the channel had a relatively small viewership. A notable early success was Politically Incorrect with Bill Maher, which after showing promise on Comedy Central was quickly snapped up by ABC. Additionally, The Daily Show had got its start with original host Craig Kilborn, although it would take a few more years for the show to reach high popularity (and a shift toward a focus on political humor) with the introduction of Jon Stewart in 1999 (who was former co-host of Short Attention Span Theater from 1991).

Dr. Katz, Professional Therapist was also a notable original program from this era, as well as the game show Win Ben Stein's Money. Successful non-original programming included Canadian comedy group The Kids in the Hall and British shows such as the British edition of Whose Line Is It Anyway? (the predecessor of the American version, featuring much of the same American cast as would later be seen in the U.S.) and the sitcom Absolutely Fabulous. Some later seasons of AbFab, as it was informally known, were partially financed by Comedy Central. Comedy Central also had the national rights to broadcast reruns of Seattle's Almost Live! between 1992 and 1993.

The channel made a breakthrough when South Park premiered in 1997. Being one of the first major basic cable shows to carry the TV-MA rating for mature audiences, the show was considered too controversial to be picked up by any mainstream network; for example, Fox (known for The Simpsons) refused to pick up the series due to the over-the-top offensive content at the time. As word of mouth spread, the number of people who requested that Comedy Central should be added to their cable providers increased, and the channel became available in over 50% of American homes by 1998.

=== 2000–2011 ===
On October 30, 2000, Comedy Central introduced a modernized version of its globe logo, by straightening and modernizing the buildings as well as removing the transmitter and marquee. The management of the network said that the transmitter of the 1991 logo was said to "communicate the 1950s broadcast era". In 2002, Comedy Central Records was formed as a means of releasing albums by comedians that have appeared on the network.

By 2003, Viacom gained full ownership of Comedy Central, and since 2003, Comedy Central has created a tradition of roasting comedians in the style of the New York Friars' Club roasts. During these roasts, friends of the roastee, along with other comedians, take turns making fun of the roastee, the other roasters, and occasionally audience members. So far, the roastees have included Denis Leary, Jeff Foxworthy, Pamela Anderson, William Shatner, Flavor Flav, Bob Saget, Larry the Cable Guy, Joan Rivers, Rob Reiner, David Hasselhoff, Donald Trump, Charlie Sheen, Roseanne Barr, James Franco, Justin Bieber, Rob Lowe, Bruce Willis, and Alec Baldwin.

The success of South Park, despite its mature content, encouraged the network to continue to push the limits on adult language. Every late Friday (early Saturday morning) and Saturday night (early Sunday morning) at 1 a.m. ET/PT, a movie, comedy special, or animated program is shown unedited for language as part of a block called the Secret Stash. It premiered on July 4, 2003, with the unedited cable television debut of South Park: Bigger, Longer & Uncut. Though no language is censored on the Secret Stash, most nudity in the programs is still edited out, except for limited nudity allowed in animated programs such as Drawn Together, and rear nudity.

Around late 2004, it was reported that the four highest-rated shows on Comedy Central were, in descending order, South Park, Chappelle's Show, The Daily Show and Reno 911!. Shortly thereafter, Dave Chappelle backed out of the much-anticipated third season of Chappelle's Show. Meanwhile, The Daily Show continued to climb in the ratings. In October 2005, on the occasion of a new three-year contract for South Park and the launch of Daily Show spin-off The Colbert Report, it was reported that South Park and The Daily Show were the two highest-rated shows on Comedy Central. Comedy Central chief Doug Herzog was reported as saying that he hoped to continue to air new seasons of South Park forever, and that The Colbert Report fulfilled a long-held plan to extend the Daily Show brand.

On April 5, 2006, in a controversial two-part episode arc titled "Cartoon Wars Part I" and "Cartoon Wars Part II", South Park touched the issue of the recent protest over the Danish cartoon drawings depicting the Muslim prophet Muhammad. The image of Muhammad did not appear in the episode. The episode also mocked fellow cartoon Family Guy. On April 13, 2006, Comedy Central issued a statement which appears to confirm that the network prohibited the show's creators from airing an image of Muhammad. The statement reads, "In light of recent world events, we feel we made the right decision." An anonymous source close to the show indicated that South Park creators Trey Parker and Matt Stone were informed of the policy several weeks earlier and wrote this story arc in protest. This was a change of policy for Comedy Central, having allowed South Park to portray an image of Muhammad in an earlier episode, "Super Best Friends". Oddly enough, an image of Muhammad was still briefly visible in the opening credits of the "Cartoon Wars" episodes (the image had been there as a call-back to "Super Best Friends").

On January 15, 2007, MTV Networks International launched Comedy Central in Germany which is available for free throughout Europe. The channel airs 33 shows either dubbed in German or subtitled while also airing locally produced shows. On April 30, Dutch channel The Box was relaunched as the Dutch version of Comedy Central during the primetime and overnight hours timesharing with Nickelodeon. On May 1, 2007, Comedy Central expanded to Italy, replacing Paramount Comedy.

On June 27, 2007, CTVglobemedia-owned networks CTV and The Comedy Network obtained the exclusive Canadian rights to the entire Comedy Central library of past and current programs on all electronic platforms, under a multi-year agreement with Viacom, expanding on past programming agreements between the two channels. Canadian users attempting to visit Comedy Central websites were redirected to The Comedy Network's website. The Canadian channel retains its brand name, but the agreement is otherwise very similar to the earlier CTV–Viacom deal for MTV in Canada. As of 2011, this geocaching no longer applies and both the Comedy Central and The Comedy Network websites can be accessed worldwide, except for videos which remain only accessible within each respective country.

In December 2007, Comedy Central picked up a show hosted by Lewis Black called Lewis Black's Root of All Evil, which debuted in March 2008. On January 9, 2008, it was announced that Comedy Central and MTV would allow the streaming its programs online for free starting in February that year. On January 24, Scott Landsman became the Vice President of Original Programming and Development at the network.

On March 27, 2008, the Swedish Radio and TV Authority approved an application from Comedy Central regarding being allowed to air television programs in Sweden. The grant allowed Comedy Central to broadcast on the terrestrial television network between January 1, 2009, and March 31, 2014, after which a new request had to be submitted to continue broadcasting. Comedy Central's U.S. flagship network picked up a remake of The Gong Show hosted by Dave Attell, star of his former self-titled Comedy Central series Insomniac, which debuted in July 2008. Another new show called Reality Bites Back premiered after The Gong Show with Dave Attell.

In June 2008, Comedy Central picked up the sketch comedy show Important Things with Demetri Martin, which began airing in February 2009. On April 1, 2009, Comedy Central began airing in New Zealand as channel 010 on SKY Digital. On April 6, Paramount Comedy in the UK and Ireland rebranded as Comedy Central. On April 7, 2009, it was announced Comedy Central would air new stand-up comedy specials starring Christopher Titus, Gabriel Iglesias, Pablo Francisco, Jim Breuer, Mitch Fatel and Pete Correale, and ventriloquist Jeff Dunham. An animated show entitled Ugly Americans was also picked up by the network. In 2009, The Goode Family premiered. Also in 2009, Thomas Lennon announced via Twitter that Reno 911! had been canceled after six seasons, much to fan disapproval. The network also played a role in the revival of the animated series Futurama, which Fox had canceled in 2003. New episodes began airing on Comedy Central in 2010. But in May 2013, Comedy Central released a statement saying that the contract between Futurama and Comedy Central would not be renewed and that the summer of 2013 would be Futurama's final season on the air. However, episodes continue to run weekly on Comedy Central.

In 2009, Comedy Central launched a 1080i high definition simulcast feed, which was available on all major cable and satellite providers. The standard definition Comedy Central downscales the HD feed and broadcasts in 16:9 letterboxed to fit the 4:3 ratio. The network also introduced the Internet viral video reaction show Tosh.0, hosted by comedian Daniel Tosh. During its second year in the summer of 2010, it became the most viewed show; overtaking The Daily Show and The Colbert Report for male audiences aged 18–49. Segments from Tosh.0's past seasons have received more views on Comedy Central's YouTube channel than any other show.

South Park episodes "200" and "201" aired in April 2010, revisiting the issue of the Islamic religious figure Muhammad's perceived immunity to parody, for fear of violent retaliation. The Super Best Friends returned, but Muhammad was entirely covered by a black bar reading "CENSORED" through all of his screen time. By the second episode of the two-parter, Comedy Central decided to censor every instance of his name, as well as three entire monologues, from the end of the show. The monologues dealt with the subjects of censorship and intimidation but did not use Muhammad's name. Trey Parker and Matt Stone have since issued a statement to the press, confirming that the "bleeps" were added weeks after the show was finished and that Comedy Central has refused to let them post the original version of South Park, in addition to retroactively removing the original "Super Best Friends" episode. Trey Parker threatened to quit the show after this incident.

=== 2011–2018 ===
Comedy Central logo used from 2011 to 2018. The two Cs are still used in the 2018 logo.

On December 9, 2010, Comedy Central introduced a new logo for the network that launched on January 1, 2011, which left behind the previous theme of a world-sized "tower" broadcasting the network/skyscrapers, in favor of an image of two "C"'s, with one of them and the word "Central" turned upside-down within the new logomark. The new logo was designed to represent the network's unique brand of comedy (with some drawing comparisons to the copyright symbol as inspiration for its design and use), and to provide the network with a logo that could be easily used across different platforms, such as social media. However, the "bars" version of the logo used from 2000 to 2011 was intended to be Comedy Central's new logo as part of a planned rebranding in 2010, and the network used it short-lived until the network started a logo nicknamed the "Comedymark". The logo's resemblance to the one used by the Federal Communications Commission was also pointed out. It went on to win several industry awards.

The Polish version of the channel was the first international Comedy Central channel to switch to the new logo on February 20, 2011; followed by the Hungarian version on April 1, 2011. Versions of the channel in Germany and the Netherlands soon followed on October 1, 2011. Comedy Central New Zealand rebranded in April 2012. Viacom 18 launched the channel in India on January 23, 2012. StarHub launched Comedy Central Asia in Singapore on November 1, 2012; the channel was added to its Basic Entertainment Upsize group.

In 2012, Atom.com (formerly AtomFilms) was absorbed into Comedy Central.

On April 1, 2012, Comedy Central launched a Russian version of Comedy Central branded as Paramount Comedy in Russia. On March 1, 2023, «Paramount Comedy» was renamed to «Comedy Central» and broadcasts in CIS countries (except Russia and Belarus).

On October 21, 2013, the network premiered a nightly comedy-game show series @midnight hosted by Chris Hardwick. @midnight served as an expansion to the network's nightly late-night programming. Due to low ratings, it was canceled on August 4, 2017, with the show airing its 600th and final episode as an hour-long special.

On May 14, 2014, Comedy Central expanded to Spain, replacing Paramount Comedy.

In 2014, it was announced that Stephen Colbert would leave Comedy Central to host The Late Show on CBS, following the retirement of David Letterman, the first host of Late Show. The final episode of The Colbert Report aired on Comedy Central on December 18, 2014, after nine years and a total of 1,447 episodes. The final episode of The Colbert Report was watched by 2.481 million viewers, making it the most-watched episode ever in the show's history. The finale was the most-watched cable program of the night in its time slot, beating The Daily Show which was seen by 2.032 million viewers. The Colbert Report was replaced on Comedy Central by Larry Wilmore from The Daily Show, who began hosting his series The Nightly Show with Larry Wilmore on January 19, 2015. The show aired until August 18, 2016, when it was canceled due to low ratings. On February 10, 2015, Jon Stewart also announced his retirement and that he would also leave the network and The Daily Show after 16 years. Stewart's final episode aired on August 6, 2015, and Trevor Noah succeeded Stewart as new host on September 28, 2015.

On January 5, 2017, the Finnish Government granted television programming licenses in the UHF band. The grant applied by Nickelodeon International Ltd allows Comedy Central to broadcast from May 17, 2017, to January 10, 2027.

On November 16, 2017, Comedy Central launched a Ukrainian version of Comedy Central branded as Paramount Comedy in Ukraine. The Ukrainian version of the channel is operated under license.

=== 2018–present ===
In July 2018, Comedy Central refreshed its branding, maintaining the existing double-C logomark, but introducing a new in-house typeface, and changing the network's corporate color to amber (while also using other colors to denote flagship programs).

On February 11, 2019, Jimmy Kimmel announced on his talk show Jimmy Kimmel Live! that Crank Yankers would be revived on Comedy Central for a fifth 20-episode season. Kimmel's brother Jonathan Kimmel served as showrunner and executive producer. The fifth season premiered on September 25, 2019.

On May 1, 2019, the Viacom-owned Pluto TV launched two Comedy Central networks titled Comedy Central Pluto and Comedy Central Stand Up. The former airs classic Comedy Central original series, while the latter airs the network's stand-up specials. On December 15, 2020, the Comedy Central Stand Up channel was removed, and a new Comedy Central Animation channel was added.

On December 4, 2019, Viacom re-merged with CBS Corporation to form ViacomCBS (now Paramount Global).

In 2020, Comedy Central began shifting its programming towards adult animation, with series pickups of Beavis and Butt-Head, a reboot of The Ren & Stimpy Show, and Daria spin-off Jodie (later changed to a television movie); the first of these titles initially premiered on Paramount+. The network also launched a new weekday animation block initially branded as Animation Contamination, featuring reruns of South Park, Futurama and The Cleveland Show.

In turn, Comedy Central has decreased its live-action slate; with the cancellations of Drunk History and Tosh.0. South Side and The Other Two would move to the Warner-owned HBO Max, while a second season of Alternatino with Arturo Castro was slated to premiere on Quibi, but failed to materialize due to the platform shutting down. Since 2019, only one scripted live-action sitcom or sketch series, Awkwafina Is Nora from Queens, was produced for the network; since that show ended in 2023, the only remaining non-animated series produced for first-run broadcast on Comedy Central is The Daily Show.

In 2025, Comedy Central's parent company, Paramount Global (formerly ViacomCBS) merged with Skydance Media to form Paramount Skydance. A year later, Paramount Skydance acquired Warner Bros. Discovery to become Skydance. Following the latter merger, Comedy Central became part of the company's new "Animation and Comedy" division under Cartoon Network and Adult Swim executive Michael Ouweleen.

== Programming ==
Current original programming seen on Comedy Central includes its two longest-running series, The Daily Show and South Park; adult animated comedies such as Digman! and Beavis and Butt-Head (which originally premiered on MTV and later Paramount+); and acquired programming such as The Office and Seinfeld.

== Executives ==
=== Presidents ===
- Bob Kreek (1991–1995) (President/CEO)
- Doug Herzog (July 1995 – December 1998) (President/CEO)
- Larry Divney (February 1999 – January 2004)
- Doug Herzog (Note: In 2006, Herzog was promoted to President of the newly-created MTVN Entertainment Group, later renamed MTV Entertainment Group then Viacom Entertainment Group. In 2015, he was promoted to President of the Viacom Music and Entertainment Group, which saw him overseeing Comedy Central, MTV, MTV 2, VH1, Spike, Logo, and digital networks. He left in 2017.)(January 2004 – 2006)
- Michele Ganeless (September 2007 – May 2016)
- Kent Alterman (May 2016 – November 2019)
- Chris McCarthy (Note: Unlike previous Comedy Central presidents, McCarthy held a higher-up position within Viacom that included being president of Comedy Central. In 2019, he became President of Entertainment and Youth Brands, which added being president of Comedy Central, TV Land, Paramount Network, and Smithsonian Channel to his portfolio of running MTV, VH1, CMT, and Logo. He was later promoted to President of MTV Entertainment Group, and in 2021, he was added CEO of MTV Entertainment Group to his title. In 2024, he became co-CEO of Paramount Global.) (November 2019 – August 2025)
- Laurel Weir (Note: Weir was promoted to head programming for MTV, Comedy Central, Nickelodeon and other cable networks, as well as overseeing Paramount's Global Programming Acquisitions Group) (November 2025 – November 2026)
- Michael Ouweleen (November 2026 – present)

=== Presidents of Original Programming and Development ===
- Lauren Corrao (November 2007 – October 2009)
- Kent Alterman (January 2013 – May 2016) (President of Content Development and Original Programming)

=== Executive Vice Presidents of Programming ===
- Eileen Katz (October 1995 – November 1999)
- Bill Hilary (January 2000 – April 2004) (General Manager and EVP of Programming)
- Michele Ganeless (October 2004 – September 2007) (General Manager)
- Lauren Corrao (May 2005 – November 2007) (Executive Vice President of Original Programming and Development)
- Kent Alterman (2010 – January 2013) (Head of Original Programming and Production)
- Jim Sharp (June 2014 – November 2019) (EVP of Original Programming and Development – West Coast)
- Sarah Babineau (February 2017 – February 2020) (Executive Vice President of Talent and Development – East Coast)
- Jonas Larsen (February 2017 – February 2020) (Executive Vice President of Talent and Development – West Coast)
- Sarah Babineau (February 2020 – April 2020) (Head of Content and Creative Enterprises)

=== Senior Vice Presidents of Original Programming and Development ===
- Michele Ganeless (January 1997 – June 2001)
- Lauren Corrao (July 2002 – June 2004)
- Lou Wallach (June 2004 – December 2008) (SVP of Original Programming and Television and Digital Development)
- Jim Sharp (September 2005 – June 2014) (West Coast)
- Gary Mann (November 2012 – February 2017)
- Sarah Babineau (June 2016 – February 2017) (East Coast)
- Monica Zielinska (June 2016 – April 2020) (West Coast)

=== Vice Presidents of Original Programming and Development ===
- Lou Wallach (June 2000 – June 2004)
- Scott Landsman (2007–2011)
- Monica Zielinska (2013 – June 2016)
- Kellyn Parker (October 2016 – August 2020) (West Coast)

=== Vice President of East Coast Development ===
- Jim Sharp (1996–1997)

=== Head of East Coast Development ===
- Kent Alterman (1996–2000)

== Criticism ==
Comedy Central has been a target of criticism from some advocacy groups, including the Parents Television and Media Council (PTMC). The PTMC criticizes their programming not merely for mature content, but also for what they perceive as bigotry and blasphemy. The PTMC has used their criticisms against Comedy Central for their support of the Family and Consumer Choice Act of 2007, which would require American cable television companies to allow their subscribers to choose which channels they subscribe to and impose the same content prohibitions that are already in place on broadcast television. The PTMC has also persuaded some advertisers to lower their interest for the channel. PTMC founder and former president L. Brent Bozell III said the channel has managed "to reach the top of its field in spite of – or, better put, because of – the network's sheer lack of comedic talent" by its "extensive reliance on shocking or disgusting humor."

On November 5, 2007, an open letter was written by VideoSift to protest the blocking of Comedy Central's embedded video content for non-American viewers.

On April 21, 2010, Comedy Central censored the South Park episode "201" in response to a death threat issued by users of a radical Muslim website over the episode's planned depiction of the Islamic prophet Muhammad, which led several newspaper columnists to condemn the network's actions as tantamount to abetting terrorism. As a rare result in the series' history, "201" and the episode that preceded it were heavily edited and are never aired as reruns.

== International ==
Since the early 2000s, Comedy Central has expanded globally with localized channels in Europe (including the United Kingdom), India, Southeast Asia, Latin America, Australia and New Zealand, Middle East, Africa, Spain and in the Commonwealth of Independent States, which are overseen by Paramount International Networks.

=== Comedy Central Extra ===
Comedy Central Extra is a British and Irish comedy-based television channel, and the sibling channel of Comedy Central in the UK and Ireland. It was originally launched in 2003 as Paramount Comedy 2, before adopting its current name in 2009.

In 2011, Extra was launched in the Netherlands. The channel ceased broadcasting on 31 December 2022; with its programming moved to the Netherlands version of Comedy Central.

The Polish version of Comedy Central Extra is owned by Paramount Networks EMEAA and Polsat. It first launched in 2010 as a programing block on VH1 Poland; it become a full TV channel on 12 June 2012.
