= The Mary Tyler Moore Show season 1 =

The Mary Tyler Moore Show
- Season 1
- No. of episodes: 24

Release
- Original network: CBS
- Original release: September 19, 1970 – March 6, 1971

Season chronology
- Next → Season 2

The first season of The Mary Tyler Moore Show aired on CBS from September 19, 1970, to March 6, 1971. It consisted of 24 half-hour episodes. The first season aired on CBS on Saturday nights at 9:30 p.m.

Recurring characters introduced in the first season were: Mary Richards (Mary Tyler Moore), Lou Grant (Ed Asner), Murray Slaughter (Gavin MacLeod), Ted Baxter (Ted Knight), Rhoda Morgenstern (Valerie Harper), Phyllis Lindstrom (Cloris Leachman), Bess Lindstrom (Lisa Gerritsen), Ida Morgenstern (Nancy Walker), and Marie Slaughter (Joyce Bulifant).

The show began in season one as a three-camera show filmed in front of a live audience largely in sequence. Moore said at the time of its debut: "The only kind of TV I would do was one like this, where you shoot it in sequence in front of a live audience."

Prior to the debut of season one, Moore described the concept as follows: "The character is going to be essentially me. Laura Petrie before she got married maybe. I'm going to be a trusting open girl of 30. I would like to be married, but I'm not desperate."

== Ratings and awards ==
During its first season, the show drew an average rating of 20.3 and ranked 22nd among prime time programs.

Season One was nominated for eight Emmy Awards as part of the 23rd Primetime Emmy Awards presented in May 1971. It lost to All in the Family for both Outstanding Comedy Series and Outstanding New Series. Moore was also nominated for Outstanding Actress in a Leading Role in a Comedy Series but lost to Jean Stapleton in her role as Edith Bunker on All in the Family. The show won four awards:

- Edward Asner as Lou Grant for Outstanding Performance by an Actor in a Supporting Role in a Comedy
- Valerie Harper as Rhoda Morgenstern for Outstanding Performance by an Actress in a Supporting Role in a Comedy
- Jay Sandrich for Outstanding Directorial Achievement in Comedy for the episode, "Toulouse Lautrec is One of My Favorite Artists"
- James L. Brooks and Allan Burns for Outstanding Writing Achievement in Comedy for the episode "Support Your Local Mother"

With four Emmy wins in its first season, it led all other comedy shows.

In addition, Moore won the Golden Globe Award in February 1971 for best actress in a musical or comedy series.

== Episodes ==
No. overall	No. in season	Title	Directed by	Written by	Film date	Original release date	Prod. code
1	1	"Love Is All Around"	Jay Sandrich	James L. Brooks and Allan Burns	July 3, 1970	September 19, 1970	7001
Mary Richards moves to Minneapolis. She had been dating a doctor, Bill (Angus Duncan), for two years during his internship and residency. Bill had promised they would marry when he began his practice, but after two years, he continued to stall. Mary left and moved to Minneapolis. Mary moves into an apartment in the same building as her old friend Phyllis Lindstrom (Cloris Leachman). Brassy Rhoda Morgenstern (Valerie Harper) lives in an apartment upstairs and claims to have a prior claim on Mary's apartment. Mary applies for a secretarial job at WJM-TV, but the position has been filled. Lou Grant (Ed Asner) concludes that Mary has "spunk" and hires her as an associate producer. Bill surprises Mary with a visit to Minneapolis. An inebriated Lou Grant shows up at Mary's apartment before Bill arrives, noting that his wife is away for a whole month and praising Mary's "great caboose." Lou decides to write a letter to his wife telling her how much he misses her. Bill arrives as Lou continues to write his letter. Mary notices how Bill chokes over the words when he says he loves her and concludes he is visiting only for sex. Mary says a final "goodbye" to Bill. Lou comforts Mary, saying that she didn't miss out on much, and Mary notes that Bill has.
2	2	"Today I am a Ma'am"	Jay Sandrich	Treva Silverman	July 17, 1970	September 26, 1970	7004
The ratings for WJM's 6 o'clock news have dropped among the "young" audience. Mary is disappointed because she is outside the 15–29 age group designated as young. Adding to Mary's concern, a mailroom messenger (David Hayward) calls her "Ma'am". Mary and Rhoda try to come up with ideas for men for Mary to date. Phyllis reminds Mary of an old boyfriend, Howard Arnell (Richard Schaal), who was crazy about Mary. Mary agrees to call Howard, and Rhoda calls Armond (Jack De Mave), a man who she hit with her car. They set up a double date at Mary's apartment. Armand misunderstands Rhoda's invitation and attends with Nancy (Sheilah Wells), his beautiful wife of three weeks. Howard is still crazy about Mary and praises her effusively. Howard incorrectly presumes that Mary wants marriage and tells her he just can't be tied down. Mary does not want a relationship with Howard and happily says goodbye to him. Guest star: Richard Schaal
3	3	"Bess, You Is My Daughter Now"	Jay Sandrich	John D.F. Black	1970	October 3, 1970	7005
Ted mixes up the wording ("vegetarian" instead of "veterinarian") on a "lost dog" story written by Murray, and Ted takes offense that Murray and Lou call his cue cards "idiot cards." Phyllis's husband Lars is diagnosed with chicken pox, and Phyllis asks Mary to take care of her daughter Bess (Lisa Gerritsen) for a few days. After a rocky start, Mary and Bess enjoy a shopping day. Phyllis announces that the chicken pox diagnosis was in error and she is taking Bess home. Bess says she wants to stay with Mary, and Phyllis agrees to respect Bess's choice. Lou is angry when Bess visits the news room because he can't cuss in the presence of a child. Bess overhears Phyllis crying over the fact that Bess wants Mary to be her mother. Phyllis's emotional response persuades Bess that her mother needs her, and Bess returns home.
4	4	"Divorce Isn't Everything"	Alan Rafkin	Treva Silverman	1970	October 10, 1970	7011
Murray wants to write a story about an organization for divorced people called the "Better Luck Next Time Club". Rhoda suggests that she and Mary join the club to become eligible for the club's discounted airfare to Paris. They attend a meeting and meet several odd characters, including Hal (David Ketchum), Sparkie (Patte Finley), Roy (Gino Conforti), Karen Norris (Jane Connell), and Richie (Vernon Weddle). Mary is elected as the club's vice president after being nominated by Dr. Walter Udall (Shelley Berman), a dentist who admires Mary's teeth. Mary makes a dental appointment with Dr. Udall and admits she is not divorced. Dr. Udall insists that Mary continue pretending to be divorced and then resign after claiming to have reconciled with her fictional ex-husband. Mary instead confesses that she lied about being divorced, and other members confess they also lied about being divorced. Guest star: Shelley Berman
5	5	"Keep Your Guard Up"	Alan Rafkin	Steve Pritzker	1970	October 17, 1970	7008
A luckless former second-string football offensive guard and life insurance salesman, Frank Carelli (John Schuck), seeks Mary's help in securing a job as WJM's sportscaster. Frank's audition goes badly, and WJM instead chooses former halfback Timothy Brown (as himself). Frank decides to move back to his home state, Florida, where he gets a job as a playground director at a park.
6	6	"Support Your Local Mother"	Alan Rafkin	Allan Burns and James L. Brooks	August 28, 1970	October 24, 1970	7002
Rhoda's mother, Ida Morgenstern (Nancy Walker), visits from New York City. Rhoda does not want to see her mother, and Mary invites Ida to stay with her. Mary's job performance suffers as she finds herself subjected to the guilt-inducing behavior that Rhoda sought to avoid. Rhoda reconciles with her mother before she returns to New York. First appearance of Nancy Walker as Rhoda's mother.
7	7	"Toulouse-Lautrec Is One of My Favorite Artists"	Jay Sandrich	Lloyd Turner and Whitey Mitchell	October 2, 1970	October 31, 1970	7013
Ted calls in sick and is unable to interview author Eric Matthews (Hamid Hamilton Camp). Mary is assigned to conduct the interview. At the end of the interview, Matthews invites Mary to dinner. Matthews is much shorter than Mary, and their conversation repeatedly turns to height, including Mary's noting that Toulous-Lautrec is one of her favorite artists. Afterward, Mary worries that, despite Eric's intelligence and wit, she is a "height bigot". In Ted's absence, Murray hosts the 6 o'clock news while wearing a toupee. Mary agrees to a second date with Eric and struggles to overlook his short stature. Eric asks Mary to read his new book which he has dedicated to Mary and titled, "Toulouse-Lautrec is One of My Favorite Artists". The book is about Eric's life experiences being short. Eric hits it off with Rhoda who was fat as a school girl. Mary was head cheerleader and voted most popular.
8	8	"The Snow Must Go On"	Jay Sandrich	David Davis and Lorenzo Music	August 14, 1970	November 7, 1970	7003
Lou puts Mary in charge of WJM's election-night coverage. A blizzard knocks out the teletype and phone lines, preventing the station from accessing the election returns. As they await the results, Ted awkwardly stalls with Humphrey Bogart impersonations, recipes, and silently staring at the camera. Mary recruits Father Flint (Ivor Francis), the host of Sermonette, to join the on-air coverage. During a break, Ted learns that Channel 3 called the mayoral election for Turner and insists on doing the same. Mary refuses to report unofficial results, and Ted backs down when Mary threatens to fire him. After being on the air all night, Chuckles the Clown (Richard Schaal) arrives for his children's show, carrying the newspaper announcing that Mitchell (and not Turner) has won the election. Chuckles announces the result on the air and gives the new mayor his "Chuckle-uck" cheer.
9	9	"Bob and Rhoda and Teddy and Mary"	Peter Baldwin	Bob Rodgers	September 18, 1970	November 14, 1970	7010
Ted, Mary, Lou, and Murray are all nominated for Teddy Awards. Rhoda's new boyfriend, Bob Peterson (Greg Mullavey) begins including Mary in "group" dating as the Three Musketeers. Bob tells Rhoda he is actually interested in Mary. Rhoda attends the Teddy Awards and incorrectly tells Mary they called her name, prompting Mary to walk to the stage to accept an award she didn't win. Lou purchases a trophy he calls the "Tinker" to improve morale in the newsroom. Dick Patterson appears as the master of ceremonies at the awards and Henry Corden as Mr. Hartunian, a wedding guest who arrives early and is seated at the WJM table.
10	10	"Assistant Wanted, Female"	Peter Baldwin	Treva Silverman	September 11, 1970	November 21, 1970	7016
Lou announces that the 6 o'clock news is being expanded from half an hour to an hour. An overworked Mary gets permission from Lou to hire an assistant. Phyllis persuades a reluctant Mary to hire her. Phyllis avoids performing the menial, "boring" work assigned by Mary and instead spends her time with Ted. Phyllis goads Ted to threaten to quit unless he gets a raise and the hiring of new writers like Norman Mailer and Truman Capote. Lou calls Ted's bluff and begins calling candidates to replace Ted. Ted backs down and, Lou directs Mary to fire Phyllis.
11	11	"1040 or Fight"	Jay Sandrich	David Davis and Lorenzo Music	TBA	November 28, 1970	7012
Mary's income tax returns are audited by a quirky IRS agent, Robert C. Brand (Paul Sand). Brand becomes enamored of Mary, taking her to dinner, sending her flowers and presents, and kissing her – all as they continue with the audit. Brand prolongs the audit and, when it ends, he's worried that Mary won't want to see him further, but Mary agrees to continue seeing him.
12	12	"Anchorman Overboard"	Jay Sandrich	Lorenzo Music	TBA	December 5, 1970	7018
Mary reluctantly arranges for Ted to speak at Phyllis's women's club. Ted's appearance is a disaster, as he is unable to answer any questions. Ted fears he has lost his charisma and his on-air performance also suffers. The ratings go up as people tune in to laugh at Ted's bloopers. A publicity man, Dave Curson (Bill Fiore) seeking to book the yo-yo association on WJM is persuaded by Mary to give their "Yo-Yo Man of the Year" award to Ted, thus restoring Ted's confidence.
13	13	"He's All Yours"	Jay Sandrich	Bob Rodgers	TBA	December 12, 1970	7014
WJM's new, young cameraman, Allen Stevens (Wes Stern), is chewed out by Lou after returning from the scene of fire with footage of ants living near the scene. Mary invites Allen to dinner to cheer him up. Mary rejects Allen's advances and tells him to go home. The next morning, Allen brags to Murray and Ted that Mary came on to him. Lou reveals that Allen is his nephew and asks Mary to be sympathetic and understanding. Phyllis pretends to be interested in Allen, believing it will scare him away, but Allen reciprocates Phyllis's advances. Allen confesses to Mary that he's a virgin and that he's been waiting for someone kind, gentle and compassionate to help him find himself. He grabs Mary, but Lou arrives, tells Allen that he thinks of Mary like his own daughter, and reassigns Allen as third apprentice in the photo lab. Having heard Allen's reports, Ted asks Mary if maybe they can have dinner, and Mary responds, "Of course not."
14	14	"Christmas and the Hard-Luck Kid II"	Jay Sandrich	James L. Brooks and Allan Burns	TBA	December 19, 1970	7023
Lou assigns Mary to work on Christmas Day, requiring her to cancel a trip to visit her family. A co-worker, Fred (Ned Wertimer), then guilts Mary to work for him on Christmas Eve so he can be with his family. Mary is alone at the studio on Christmas Eve when Lou, Ted, and Murray make a surprise visit. Henry Corden is the voice of Charlie who radios in from the transmitter. TV Guide ranked this as the best Christmas television episode.
15	15	"Howard's Girl"	Jay Sandrich	Treva Silverman	TBA	January 2, 1971	7017
Mary makes a date with speech writer Paul Arnell (Richard Schaal), the brother of Howard Arnell who she dated in Episode No. 2. Paul and Mary visit his parents (Mary Jackson and Henry Jones), who are under the impression that Mary is in a steady relationship with Howard, their favorite son. Paul informs his parents that Mary is his date and is not Howard's girl.
16	16	"Party Is Such Sweet Sorrow"	Jay Sandrich	Martin Cohan	TBA	January 9, 1971	7020
Mary is offered a job by Bob Freelander (Richard Clair), the general manager of a competing station, as the producer of a women's talk show. Mary doesn't want to take the job, but she needs the extra money. Lou is unable to get a raise for Mary, and Mary accepts the new job. Lou and Murray hold a going-away party on Mary's last day. Mary breaks down in tears at leaving WJM. Ted gets intoxicated and admits he's a terrible news man and should have been a male fashion model. Lou tells Mary that he got the general manager to match Freelander's offer by threatening to quit himself, and Mary agrees to stay at WJM.
17	17	"Just a Lunch"	Bruce Bilson	James L. Brooks and Allan Burns	TBA	January 16, 1971	7007
Network war correspondent John Corcoran (Monte Markham) returns from Vietnam and visits WJM. An attraction develops between Mary and Corcoran. Corcoran is married, though he claims to be separated. Mary decides not to see Corcoran, but he continues to pursue her. Includes Joyce Bulifant's first appearance as Murray's wife, Marie.
18	18	"Second Story Story"	Jay Sandrich	Steve Pritzker	TBA	January 23, 1971	7024
Mary's apartment is burglarized twice in a few days. Officer Larry Tully (Bob Dishy) takes an interest in Mary and, with his partner Officer Jackson (Vic Tayback), catches the burglar and recovers Mary's property. Burt Mustin appears as an old man at the police station who has been mugged 13 times.
19	19	"We Closed in Minneapolis"	Jay Sandrich	Kenny Solms and Gail Parent	December 11, 1970	January 30, 1971	7022
After prior rejections, Murray's play about a newsroom is accepted by the Twin Cities Playhouse. Ted is cast as the anchorman and Mary as a cute, perky, and dumb woman named "Mary" who works in the newsroom. Mary takes offense at being portrayed as dumb. Lou takes offense at the portrayal of the angry newsroom director named "Lou". Ted wants Murray to give his character better lines. A newspaper review titled, "Bomb Hits Minneapolis", pans the production with the exception of Mary's performance which is called "adequate". Joyce Bulifant appears as Murray's pregnant wife, Marie.
20	20	"Hi!"	Jay Sandrich	Treva Silverman	December 18, 1970	February 6, 1971	7019
In the hospital for a tonsillectomy, Mary shares a room with Loretta Kuhne (Pat Carroll), a grumpy patient suffering from a broken leg, a stomach ulcer, and a troubled marriage. Mary's anaesthesiologist (Robert Casper) arrives before the surgery to deliver his bill, worried he might not be paid. After the surgery, Bert (Bruce Kirby) drops by to see Loretta, followed by visits to Mary from Rhoda, Lou, Murray, and Ted. As Mary prepares to leave, Loretta apologizes for her crankiness and mentions that she is returning to her husband, who is not Bert (he was a friend).
21	21	"The Boss Isn't Coming to Dinner"	Jay Sandrich	David Davis and Lorenzo Music	TBA	February 13, 1971	7021
Following the wedding of Lou's daughter, Lou and his wife are alone in the house together. Lou makes excuses to reject Mary's invitations to have Lou and his wife over for dinner. Mary calls Lou's wife and learns that she and Lou are separated. Weatherman Gordy (John Amos) plays a more prominent role in the episode's newsroom banter.
22	22	"A Friend in Deed"	Jay Sandrich	Susan Silver	January 15, 1971	February 20, 1971	7025
Mary's bubbly forgotten pal from summer camp, "Twinks" McFarland (Patte Finley), turns up as WJM's new receptionist and wants to be Mary's best friend again. Mary tires of "Twinks" but is asked to be the maid of honor at her wedding. At the last minute, Twinks' best friend from out of town agrees to attend the wedding, and Twinks withdraws Mary's role as maid of honor. Finley had previously appeared as "Sparkie" in episode 4.
23	23	"Smokey the Bear Wants You"	Jay Sandrich	Steve Pritzker	TBA	February 27, 1971	7015
Rhoda's new boyfriend, Chuck Pelligrini (Michael Callan), takes her to the best restaurants and offers to give her his car. His job is a mystery, and Mary and Rhoda suspect Chuck may be involved in organized crime. He finally discloses that he was the vice president of a snowblower and lawnmower company, but he quit two months ago and plans to go back to college to become a forest ranger. He invites Mary and Rhoda on a camping trip. After the trip, Rhoda concludes that forest life is not for her; she wants a "wild life, not wildlife." Despite their differences, Rhoda and Chuck decide to continue seeing each other.
24	24	"The 45-Year-Old Man"	Herbert Kenwith	George Kirgo	TBA	March 6, 1971	7009
Ted and the new station manager, Barry Phelps (Richard Roat), repeatedly mistake Gordy the weatherman for the sports guy. Phelps fires "Big Chicken" (Richard Libertini), the host of a children's show. The newsroom staff (except for Lou) is called into a meeting with Phelps and the advertising manager (Sid Clute). They are told that Lou is being fired. Mary shares the news with Lou. To save Lou's job, Mary visits the eccentric station owner, Wild Jack Monroe (Slim Pickens), a former western movie star who lives on a ranch outside Minneapolis. While riding a stuffed horse and waving a rifle, Wild Bill agrees to look into it. Ed is packing his desk when Wild Bill walks into the newsroom, mistakes Gordy for the sports guy, and overrules the firing of Lou (and of Big Chicken as well).
