= List of The Mary Tyler Moore Show episodes =

The Mary Tyler Moore Show was an American television series that originally aired from September 19, 1970, to March 19, 1977. Each season consisted of 24 half-hour episodes.

== Series overview ==
All seven seasons have been released on DVD by 20th Century Fox Home Entertainment. In addition, the series is also available for streaming and download in the digital format.

Season	Episodes	Originally released		Rank	Rating
Season	Episodes	First released	Last released	Rank	Rating
1	24	September 19, 1970	March 6, 1971	22	20.3
2	24	September 18, 1971	March 4, 1972	10	23.7
3	24	September 16, 1972	March 3, 1973	7	23.6
4	24	September 15, 1973	March 2, 1974	9	23.1
5	24	September 14, 1974	March 8, 1975	11	24.0
6	24	September 13, 1975	March 6, 1976	19	21.9
7	24	September 25, 1976	March 19, 1977	39	19.2

Timeslot:

- Seasons 1–2: Saturday at 9:30 pm.
- Seasons 3–6: Saturday at 9:00 pm.
- Season 7: Saturday at 9:00 pm for episodes 1–6, then 8:00 pm for episodes 7–24.

== Cast ==
- Mary Tyler Moore as Mary Richards
- Ed Asner as Lou Grant
- Gavin MacLeod as Murray Slaughter
- Ted Knight as Ted Baxter
- Cloris Leachman as Phyllis Lindstrom (seasons 1–5)
- Valerie Harper as Rhoda Morgenstern (seasons 1–4)
- Georgia Engel as Georgette Franklin (seasons 3–7)
- Betty White as Sue Ann Nivens (seasons 4–7)

== Episodes ==
=== Season 1 (1970–1971) ===
- Consisted of 24 half-hour episodes airing on CBS.

No. overall	No. in season	Title	Directed by	Written by	Film date	Original release date	Prod. code
1	1	"Love Is All Around"	Jay Sandrich	James L. Brooks and Allan Burns	July 3, 1970	September 19, 1970	7001
Mary Richards moves to Minneapolis. She had been dating a doctor, Bill (Angus Duncan), for two years during his internship and residency. Bill had promised they would marry when he began his practice, but after two years, he continued to stall. Mary moved into an apartment in Minneapolis in the same building as her old friend Phyllis Lindstrom (Cloris Leachman). Brassy Rhoda Morgenstern (Valerie Harper) lives in an apartment upstairs and claims to have a prior claim on Mary's apartment. Mary applies for a secretarial job at WJM-TV, but the position has been filled. Lou Grant (Ed Asner) concludes that Mary has "spunk" and hires her as an associate producer. Bill surprises Mary with a visit to Minneapolis. An inebriated Lou shows up at Mary's apartment before Bill arrives, noting that his wife is away for a whole month and praising Mary's "great caboose." Lou decides to write a letter to his wife telling her how much he misses her. When Bill arrives, Mary notices how he chokes over his words when he says he loves her. Mary says a final "goodbye" to Bill. Lou comforts Mary, saying that she didn't miss out on much, and Mary notes that Bill has.
2	2	"Today I am a Ma'am"	Jay Sandrich	Treva Silverman	July 17, 1970	September 26, 1970	7004
The ratings for WJM's 6 o'clock news have dropped among the "young" audience. Mary is disappointed because she is outside the 15–29 age group designated as young. Adding to Mary's concern, a mailroom messenger (David Hayward) calls her "Ma'am". Mary and Rhoda try to come up with ideas for men for Mary to date. Phyllis reminds Mary of an old boyfriend, Howard Arnell (Richard Schaal), who was crazy about Mary. Mary agrees to call Howard, and Rhoda calls Armond (Jack De Mave), a man who she hit with her car. They set up a double date at Mary's apartment. Armand misunderstands Rhoda's invitation and attends with Nancy (Sheilah Wells), his beautiful wife of three weeks. Howard is still crazy about Mary and praises her effusively. Howard incorrectly presumes that Mary wants marriage and tells her he just can't be tied down. Mary does not want a relationship with Howard and happily says goodbye to him. Guest star: Richard Schaal
3	3	"Bess, You Is My Daughter Now"	Jay Sandrich	John D.F. Black	July 10, 1970	October 3, 1970	7005
Ted mixes up the wording ("vegetarian" instead of "veterinarian") on a "lost dog" story written by Murray, and Ted takes offense that Murray and Lou call his cue cards "idiot cards." Phyllis's husband Lars is diagnosed with chicken pox, and Phyllis asks Mary to take care of her daughter Bess (Lisa Gerritsen) for a few days. After a rocky start, Mary and Bess enjoy a shopping day. Phyllis announces that the chicken pox diagnosis was in error and she is taking Bess home. Bess says she wants to stay with Mary, and Phyllis agrees to respect Bess's choice. Lou is angry when Bess visits the news room because he can't cuss in the presence of a child. Bess overhears Phyllis crying over the fact that Bess wants Mary to be her mother. Phyllis's emotional response persuades Bess that her mother needs her, and Bess returns home.
4	4	"Divorce Isn't Everything"	Alan Rafkin	Treva Silverman	August 31, 1970	October 10, 1970	7011
Murray wants to write a story about an organization for divorced people called the "Better Luck Next Time Club". Rhoda suggests that she and Mary join the club to become eligible for the club's discounted airfare to Paris. They attend a meeting and meet several odd characters, including Hal (David Ketchum), Sparkie (Patte Finley), Roy (Gino Conforti), Karen Norris (Jane Connell), and Richie (Vernon Weddle). Mary is elected as the club's vice president after being nominated by Dr. Walter Udall (Shelley Berman), a dentist who admires Mary's teeth. Mary makes a dental appointment with Dr. Udall and admits she is not divorced. Dr. Udall insists that Mary continue pretending to be divorced and then resign after claiming to have reconciled with her fictional ex-husband. Mary instead confesses that she lied about being divorced, and other members confess they also lied about being divorced. Guest star: Shelley Berman
5	5	"Keep Your Guard Up"	Alan Rafkin	Steve Pritzker	August 07, 1970	October 17, 1970	7008
A luckless former second-string football offensive guard and life insurance salesman, Frank Carelli (John Schuck), seeks Mary's help in securing a job as WJM's sportscaster. Frank's audition goes badly, and WJM instead chooses former halfback Timothy Brown (as himself). Frank decides to move back to his home state, Florida, where he gets a job as a playground director at a park.
6	6	"Support Your Local Mother"	Alan Rafkin	Allan Burns and James L. Brooks	August 24, 1970	October 24, 1970	7002
Rhoda's mother, Ida Morgenstern (Nancy Walker), visits from New York City. Rhoda does not want to see her mother, and Mary invites Ida to stay with her. Mary's job performance suffers as she finds herself subjected to the guilt-inducing behavior that Rhoda sought to avoid. Rhoda reconciles with her mother before she returns to New York. First appearance of Nancy Walker as Rhoda's mother.
7	7	"Toulouse-Lautrec Is One of My Favorite Artists"	Jay Sandrich	Lloyd Turner and Whitey Mitchell	October 2, 1970	October 31, 1970	7013
Ted calls in sick and is unable to interview author Eric Matthews (Hamid Hamilton Camp). Mary is assigned to conduct the interview. At the end of the interview, Matthews invites Mary to dinner. Matthews is much shorter than Mary, and their conversation repeatedly turns to height, including Mary's noting that Toulous-Lautrec is one of her favorite artists. Afterward, Mary worries that, despite Eric's intelligence and wit, she is a "height bigot". In Ted's absence, Murray hosts the 6 o'clock news while wearing a toupee. Mary agrees to a second date with Eric and struggles to overlook his short stature. Eric asks Mary to read his new book which he has dedicated to Mary and titled, "Toulouse-Lautrec is One of My Favorite Artists". The book is about Eric's life experiences being short. Eric hits it off with Rhoda who was fat as a school girl. Mary was head cheerleader and voted most popular.
8	8	"The Snow Must Go On"	Jay Sandrich	David Davis and Lorenzo Music	August 14, 1970	November 7, 1970	7003
Lou puts Mary in charge of WJM's election-night coverage. A blizzard knocks out the teletype and phone lines, preventing the station from accessing the election returns. As they await the results, Ted awkwardly stalls with Humphrey Bogart impersonations, recipes, and silently staring at the camera. Mary recruits Father Flint (Ivor Francis), the host of Sermonette, to join the on-air coverage. During a break, Ted learns that Channel 3 called the mayoral election for Turner and insists on doing the same. Mary refuses to report unofficial results, and Ted backs down when Mary threatens to fire him. After being on the air all night, Chuckles the Clown (Richard Schaal) arrives for his children's show, carrying the newspaper announcing that Mitchell (and not Turner) has won the election. Chuckles announces the result on the air and gives the new mayor his "Chuckle-uck" cheer.
9	9	"Bob and Rhoda and Teddy and Mary"	Peter Baldwin	Bob Rodgers	September 14, 1970	November 14, 1970	7010
Ted, Mary, Lou, and Murray are all nominated for Teddy Awards. Rhoda's new boyfriend, Bob Peterson (Greg Mullavey) begins including Mary in "group" dating as the Three Musketeers. Bob tells Rhoda he is actually interested in Mary. Rhoda attends the Teddy Awards and incorrectly tells Mary they called her name, prompting Mary to walk to the stage to accept an award she didn't win. Lou purchases a trophy he calls the "Tinker" to improve morale in the newsroom. Dick Patterson appears as the master of ceremonies at the awards and Henry Corden as Mr. Hartunian, a wedding guest who arrives early and is seated at the WJM table.
10	10	"Assistant Wanted, Female"	Peter Baldwin	Treva Silverman	September 11, 1970	November 21, 1970	7016
Lou announces that the 6 o'clock news is being expanded from half an hour to an hour. An overworked Mary gets permission from Lou to hire an assistant. Phyllis persuades a reluctant Mary to hire her. Phyllis avoids performing the menial, "boring" work assigned by Mary and instead spends her time with Ted. Phyllis goads Ted to threaten to quit unless he gets a raise and the hiring of new writers like Norman Mailer and Truman Capote. Lou calls Ted's bluff and begins calling candidates to replace Ted. Ted backs down and, Lou directs Mary to fire Phyllis.
11	11	"1040 or Fight"	Jay Sandrich	David Davis and Lorenzo Music	TBA	November 28, 1970	7012
Mary's income tax returns are audited by a quirky IRS agent, Robert C. Brand (Paul Sand). Brand becomes enamored of Mary, taking her to dinner, sending her flowers and presents, and kissing her – all as they continue with the audit. Brand prolongs the audit and, when it ends, he's worried that Mary won't want to see him further, but Mary agrees to continue seeing him.
12	12	"Anchorman Overboard"	Jay Sandrich	Lorenzo Music	TBA	December 5, 1970	7018
Mary reluctantly arranges for Ted to speak at Phyllis's women's club. Ted's appearance is a disaster, as he is unable to answer any questions. Ted fears he has lost his charisma and his on-air performance also suffers. The ratings go up as people tune in to laugh at Ted's bloopers. A publicity man, Dave Curson (Bill Fiore) seeking to book the yo-yo association on WJM is persuaded by Mary to give their "Yo-Yo Man of the Year" award to Ted, thus restoring Ted's confidence.
13	13	"He's All Yours"	Jay Sandrich	Bob Rodgers	TBA	December 12, 1970	7014
WJM's new, young cameraman, Allen Stevens (Wes Stern), is chewed out by Lou after returning from the scene of fire with footage of ants living near the scene. Mary invites Allen to dinner to cheer him up. Mary rejects Allen's advances and tells him to go home. The next morning, Allen brags to Murray and Ted that Mary came on to him. Lou reveals that Allen is his nephew and asks Mary to be sympathetic and understanding. Phyllis pretends to be interested in Allen, believing it will scare him away, but Allen reciprocates Phyllis's advances. Allen confesses to Mary that he's a virgin and that he's been waiting for someone kind, gentle and compassionate to help him find himself. He grabs Mary, but Lou arrives, tells Allen that he thinks of Mary like his own daughter, and reassigns Allen as third apprentice in the photo lab. Having heard Allen's reports, Ted asks Mary if maybe they can have dinner, and Mary responds, "Of course not."
14	14	"Christmas and the Hard-Luck Kid II"	Jay Sandrich	James L. Brooks and Allan Burns	November 13, 1970	December 19, 1970	7023
Lou assigns Mary to work on Christmas Day, requiring her to cancel a trip to visit her family. A co-worker, Fred (Ned Wertimer), then guilts Mary to work for him on Christmas Eve so he can be with his family. Mary is alone at the studio on Christmas Eve when Lou, Ted, and Murray make a surprise visit. Henry Corden is the voice of Charlie who radios in from the transmitter. TV Guide ranked this as the best Christmas television episode.
15	15	"Howard's Girl"	Jay Sandrich	Treva Silverman	November 20, 1970	January 2, 1971	7017
Mary makes a date with speech writer Paul Arnell (Richard Schaal), the brother of Howard Arnell who she dated in Episode No. 2. Paul and Mary visit his parents (Mary Jackson and Henry Jones), who are under the impression that Mary is in a steady relationship with Howard, their favorite son. Paul informs his parents that Mary is his date and is not Howard's girl.
16	16	"Party Is Such Sweet Sorrow"	Jay Sandrich	Martin Cohan	TBA	January 9, 1971	7020
Mary is offered a job by Bob Freelander (Richard Clair), the general manager of a competing station, as the producer of a women's talk show. Mary doesn't want to take the job, but she needs the extra money. Lou is unable to get a raise for Mary, and Mary accepts the new job. Lou and Murray hold a going-away party on Mary's last day. Mary breaks down in tears at leaving WJM. Ted gets intoxicated and admits he's a terrible news man and should have been a male fashion model. Lou tells Mary that he got the general manager to match Freelander's offer by threatening to quit himself, and Mary agrees to stay at WJM.
17	17	"Just a Lunch"	Bruce Bilson	James L. Brooks and Allan Burns	TBA	January 16, 1971	7007
Network war correspondent John Corcoran (Monte Markham) returns from Vietnam and visits WJM. An attraction develops between Mary and Corcoran. Corcoran is married, though he claims to be separated. Mary decides not to see Corcoran, but he continues to pursue her. Includes Joyce Bulifant's first appearance as Murray's wife, Marie.
18	18	"Second Story Story"	Jay Sandrich	Steve Pritzker	TBA	January 23, 1971	7024
Mary's apartment is burglarized twice in a few days. Officer Larry Tully (Bob Dishy) takes an interest in Mary and, with his partner Officer Jackson (Vic Tayback), catches the burglar and recovers Mary's property. Burt Mustin appears as an old man at the police station who has been mugged 13 times.
19	19	"We Closed in Minneapolis"	Jay Sandrich	Kenny Solms and Gail Parent	December 11, 1970	January 30, 1971	7022
After prior rejections, Murray's play about a newsroom is accepted by the Twin Cities Playhouse. Ted is cast as the anchorman and Mary as a cute, perky, and dumb woman named "Mary" who works in the newsroom. Mary takes offense at being portrayed as dumb. Lou takes offense at the portrayal of the angry newsroom director named "Lou". Ted wants Murray to give his character better lines. A newspaper review titled, "Bomb Hits Minneapolis", pans the production with the exception of Mary's performance which is called "adequate". Joyce Bulifant appears as Murray's pregnant wife, Marie.
20	20	"Hi!"	Jay Sandrich	Treva Silverman	December 18, 1970	February 6, 1971	7019
In the hospital for a tonsillectomy, Mary shares a room with Loretta Kuhne (Pat Carroll), a grumpy patient suffering from a broken leg, a stomach ulcer, and a troubled marriage. Mary's anaesthesiologist (Robert Casper) arrives before the surgery to deliver his bill, worried he might not be paid. After the surgery, Bert (Bruce Kirby) drops by to see Loretta, followed by visits to Mary from Rhoda, Lou, Murray, and Ted. As Mary prepares to leave, Loretta apologizes for her crankiness and mentions that she is returning to her husband, who is not Bert (he was a friend).
21	21	"The Boss Isn't Coming to Dinner"	Jay Sandrich	David Davis and Lorenzo Music	TBA	February 13, 1971	7021
Following the wedding of Lou's daughter, Lou and his wife are alone in the house together. Lou makes excuses to reject Mary's invitations to have Lou and his wife over for dinner. Mary calls Lou's wife and learns that she and Lou are separated. Weatherman Gordy (John Amos) plays a more prominent role in the episode's newsroom banter.
22	22	"A Friend in Deed"	Jay Sandrich	Susan Silver	January 15, 1971	February 20, 1971	7025
Mary's bubbly forgotten pal from summer camp, "Twinks" McFarland (Patte Finley), turns up as WJM's new receptionist and wants to be Mary's best friend again. Mary tires of "Twinks" but is asked to be the maid of honor at her wedding. At the last minute, Twinks' best friend from out of town agrees to attend the wedding, and Twinks withdraws Mary's role as maid of honor. Finley had previously appeared as "Sparkie" in episode 4.
23	23	"Smokey the Bear Wants You"	Jay Sandrich	Steve Pritzker	January 22, 1971	February 27, 1971	7015
Rhoda's new boyfriend, Chuck Pelligrini (Michael Callan), takes her to the best restaurants and offers to give her his car. His job is a mystery, and Mary and Rhoda suspect Chuck may be involved in organized crime. He finally discloses that he was the vice president of a snowblower and lawnmower company, but he quit two months ago and plans to go back to college to become a forest ranger. He invites Mary and Rhoda on a camping trip. After the trip, Rhoda concludes that forest life is not for her; she wants a "wild life, not wildlife." Despite their differences, Rhoda and Chuck decide to continue seeing each other.
24	24	"The 45-Year-Old Man"	Herbert Kenwith	George Kirgo	TBA	March 6, 1971	7009
Ted and the new station manager, Barry Phelps (Richard Roat), repeatedly mistake Gordy the weatherman for the sports guy. Phelps fires "Big Chicken" (Richard Libertini), the host of a children's show. The newsroom staff (except for Lou) is called into a meeting with Phelps and the advertising manager (Sid Clute). They are told that Lou is being fired. Mary shares the news with Lou. To save Lou's job, Mary visits the eccentric station owner, Wild Jack Monroe (Slim Pickens), a former western movie star who lives on a ranch outside Minneapolis. While riding a stuffed horse and waving a rifle, Wild Bill agrees to look into it. Ed is packing his desk when Wild Bill walks into the newsroom, mistakes Gordy for the sports guy, and overrules the firing of Lou (and of Big Chicken as well).

=== Season 2 (1971–1972) ===
- Consisted of 24 half-hour episodes airing on CBS.

No. overall	No. in season	Title	Directed by	Written by	Film date	Original release date	Prod. code
25	1	"The Birds...and...um...Bess"	Jay Sandrich	Treva Silverman	June 11, 1971	September 18, 1971	7108
When Mary produces a documentary called, "What's Your Sexual I.Q.?," the station gets swamped with calls, and Phyllis asks her to teach Bess about the "facts of life."
26	2	"I Am Curious Cooper"	Jay Sandrich	David Davis and Lorenzo Music	TBA	September 25, 1971	7105
Lou breaks his rule about fixing people up and sets up a blind date with Mary and one of his old friends, Mike Cooper, then has second thoughts and decides he better go along as a chaperone. Unfortunately, there is no chemistry between Mary and Mike. Lou is impressed that Mike has a phone in his car. Michael Constantine guest stars.
27	3	"He's No Heavy...He's My Brother"	Jerry Paris	Allan Burns	TBA	October 2, 1971	7107
The success of Mary and Rhoda's vacation to Mexico depends on whether they are willing to deliver a mysterious package across the border for the owner of a Mexican restaurant.
28	4	"Room 223"	Jay Sandrich	Susan Silver	August 13, 1971	October 9, 1971	7115
Frustrated with her lack of progress at WJM, Mary decides to sharpen her skills with a class in television journalism. Naturally, she catches the teacher's eye. She and her instructor, Dan Whitfield (played by Michael Tolan), start dating. He gives her a C+ for her final paper.
29	5	"A Girl's Best Mother Is Not Her Friend"	Jay Sandrich	David Davis and Lorenzo Music	July 2, 1971	October 16, 1971	7110
Rhoda's visiting mother decides to become Mary's "friend."
30	6	"Cover Boy"	Jay Sandrich	Treva Silverman	June 18, 1971	October 23, 1971	7102
Ted receives a visit from his super-competitive brother, a male model. Jack Cassidy guest stars.
31	7	"Didn't You Used to Be... Wait... Don't Tell Me"	Jay Sandrich	Allan Burns	TBA	October 30, 1971	7111
Assuming that the relentless Howard Arnell will not be going, Mary decides to attend a high school reunion, and Rhoda comes along.
32	8	"Thoroughly Unmilitant Mary"	Jay Sandrich	Martin Cohan	August 20, 1971	November 6, 1971	7103
The television newswriters union goes on strike, other guilds and unions follow, and Mary has to cross the picket line.
33	9	"And Now, Sitting in for Ted Baxter"	Jerry Paris	Steve Pritzker	TBA	November 13, 1971	7109
Not without reason, Ted is worried that his mandatory vacation might become a permanent one.
34	10	"Don't Break the Chain"	Jerry Paris	David Davis and Lorenzo Music	TBA	November 20, 1971	7116
Mary conjures up a few men from her past when she reluctantly continues Lou's chain letter.
35	11	"The Six-and-a-Half-Year Itch"	Jay Sandrich	Treva Silverman	September 24, 1971	November 27, 1971	7112
Lou catches his favorite son-in-law (Lawrence Pressman) at a movie theater with another woman.
36	12	"...Is a Friend in Need"	Jay Sandrich	Susan Silver	TBA	December 4, 1971	7106
Rhoda is not having much luck finding a new job, yet Mary conceals from her an opening at WJM.
37	13	"The Square-Shaped Room"	Jay Sandrich	Susan Silver	October 1, 1971	December 11, 1971	7117
Mary arranges for Rhoda to redecorate Lou's living room.
38	14	"Ted Over Heels"	Peter Baldwin	David Davis and Lorenzo Music	November 5, 1971	December 18, 1971	7122
Ted falls in love with the daughter of Chuckles the Clown. Arlene Golonka guest stars.
39	15	"The Five-Minute Dress"	Jay Sandrich	Pat Nardo and Gloria Banta	TBA	January 1, 1972	7119
Mary's new love interest, an assistant to the governor, keeps breaking their dates.
40	16	"Feeb"	Peter Baldwin	Dick Clair and Jenna McMahon	TBA	January 8, 1972	7120
Mary feels so guilty for getting an incompetent waitress named Randy (Barbara Sharma) fired that she offers her a job in the newsroom. Despite her awful work performance, Mary struggles to fire her, but Lou eventually fires Randy anyway.
41	17	"The Slaughter Affair"	Peter Baldwin	Rick Mittleman	TBA	January 15, 1972	7118
Murray has been moonlighting to earn extra money for a special anniversary gift, but his lack of sleep is starting to affect his performance in the newsroom.
42	18	"Baby Sit-Com"	Jay Sandrich	Treva Silverman	TBA	January 22, 1972	7123
Mary is committed to watching Bess over the weekend, so when an old flame unexpectedly comes to town, she turns to an unlikely babysitter — Lou.
43	19	"More Than Neighbors"	Jay Sandrich	Steve Pritzker	TBA	January 29, 1972	7101
There is a vacant apartment in Mary's building, and Ted wants to move into it.
44	20	"The Care and Feeding of Parents"	Jay Sandrich	Dick Clair and Jenna McMahon	TBA	February 5, 1972	7114
Pressured by Phyllis, Mary reluctantly agrees to ask the publishing company in her office building to consider Bess's school composition for "Teen Topics' magazine.
45	21	"Where There's Smoke, There's Rhoda"	Peter Baldwin	Martin Cohan	December 10, 1971	February 12, 1972	7124
A friendship is put to the test when Rhoda temporarily moves in with Mary.
46	22	"You Certainly Are a Big Boy"	Jay Sandrich	Martin Cohan	TBA	February 19, 1972	7113
Mary knew the architect she is interested in had a son, but she did not know the son is all grown up. Bradford Dillman guest stars.
47	23	"Some of My Best Friends Are Rhoda"	Peter Baldwin	Steve Pritzker	November 26, 1971	February 26, 1972	7121
Mary's new friend, Joanne, is attractive, successful, and polished, but she does not seem to take to Rhoda. Mary Frann guest stars.
48	24	"His Two Right Arms"	Jay Sandrich	Jim Parker and Arnold Margolin	TBA	March 4, 1972	7125
Mary helps the staff of an incompetent councilman prepare for his appearance on WJM's Face the People show. Bill Daily and Isabel Sanford guest star. This episode was intended as a backdoor pilot for a series that would star Daily as a bumbling politician, but the network passed.

=== Season 3 (1972–1973) ===
- Consisted of 24 half-hour episodes airing on CBS.
- Recurring Character Debuts: Georgette Franklin.
- This is the last season to have the 1966 CBS in Color logo.

No. overall	No. in season	Title	Directed by	Written by	Film date	Original release date	Prod. code
49	1	"The Good Time News"	Hal Cooper	Allan Burns and James L. Brooks	August 4, 1972	September 16, 1972	7214
Both Lou and Ted are unhappy about the upbeat "happy news" format Mary has been assigned to develop for the "Six O'Clock News." Guest starring Robert Hogan.
50	2	"What Is Mary Richards Really Like?"	Jerry Belson	Susan Silver	TBA	September 23, 1972	7206
A local newspaper columnist, Mark Williams (Peter Haskell), whom Lou is convinced loves to destroy people's reputations, interviews Mary about being the only woman in the WJM newsroom.
51	3	"Who's in Charge Here?"	Jay Sandrich	Martin Cohan	TBA	September 30, 1972	7205
Lou's promotion to program manager leaves Murray in charge of the newsroom, a task for which he is totally unqualified.
52	4	"Enter Rhoda's Parents"	Jay Sandrich	Martin Cohan	TBA	October 7, 1972	7209
Rhoda is shocked when her parents arrive for a visit and her mother reveals that she is convinced her husband is seeing another woman. First appearance of Harold Gould as Rhoda's father, Martin Morgenstern. Note: This is the last episode that Ted Knight does not appear in.
53	5	"It's Whether You Win or Lose"	Jay Sandrich	Martin Donovan	TBA	October 14, 1972	7201
When Lou is kept from joining his poker pals in Las Vegas, he insists Mary set up a poker game at work, which becomes a problem for Murray, former compulsive gambler.
54	6	"Rhoda the Beautiful"	Jay Sandrich	Treva Silverman	June 30, 1972	October 21, 1972	7207
Even though she has lost 20 pounds, Rhoda still feels fat and hopeless, but she gets a boost of confidence when she enters Hempel's Department Store's beauty contest.
55	7	"Just Around the Corner"	Jay Sandrich	Steve Pritzker	June 16, 1972	October 28, 1972	7204
When Mary's parents move into a new house just around the corner from her apartment and then start planning her social schedule, Mary turns to Rhoda for advice. Guest stars: Nanette Fabray and Bill Quinn.
56	8	"But Seriously, Folks"	Peter Baldwin	Ed. Weinberger	TBA	November 4, 1972	7212
Mary tries to help out when her new boyfriend, the station's "Chuckles the Clown" writer, quits his job in order to fulfill his lifelong ambition of performing as a stand-up comedian. Guest star: Jerry Van Dyke.
57	9	"Farmer Ted and the News"	Jay Sandrich	Martin Donovan	August 18, 1972	November 11, 1972	7203
Lou realizes he has made a big mistake after he signs a new contract that allows Ted to earn extra money appearing in TV commercials on several local stations.
58	10	"Have I Found a Guy for You"	Hal Cooper	Charlotte Brown	TBA	November 18, 1972	7208
If Mary is crushed when she learns the marriage of her longtime friends (guest stars Bert Convy and Beth Howland) is coming to an end, she is stunned when she realizes the husband wants to start dating her.
59	11	"You've Got a Friend"	Jerry Belson	Steve Pritzker	July 14, 1972	November 25, 1972	7210
Mary's father is having trouble adjusting to his new life in the city because he misses his old buddies, so Mary invites him to lunch with her and Lou. Nanette Fabray and Bill Quinn again appear as Mary's parents, with this episode being Nanette Fabray's final appearance as Dottie Richards.
60	12	"It Was Fascination, I Know"	Jay Sandrich	Ed. Weinberger	TBA	December 2, 1972	7211
Bess's 15-year-old boyfriend develops a crush on Mary.
61	13	"Operation: Lou"	Jay Sandrich	Elias Davis and David Pollock	TBA	December 9, 1972	7216
Lou goes to the hospital to have some shrapnel from World War II removed and leaves Mary in charge. Unfortunately, Mary and Murray clash, but, at the same time, Lou bonds with Ted in the hospital.
62	14	"Rhoda Morgenstern: Minneapolis to New York"	Jay Sandrich	Treva Silverman	September 15, 1972	December 16, 1972	7213
Mary is devastated when Rhoda returns from a vacation in New York and announces she has accepted a job and will be leaving Minneapolis for the Big Apple. First appearance of Georgia Engel as Georgette.
63	15	"The Courtship of Mary's Father's Daughter"	Jay Sandrich	David Pollock and Elias Davis	October 13, 1972	December 23, 1972	7218
Mary once again finds herself cast as "the other woman" when an ex-boyfriend (Dan Whitfield, the journalism writing instructor from season 2, episode 4) invites her to his engagement party, much to the dismay of his new fiancee. Bill Quinn's final appearance as "Walter Richards".
64	16	"Lou's Place"	Jay Sandrich	Ed. Weinberger	TBA	January 6, 1973	7219
Lou achieves a lifelong dream when he becomes the owner of his favorite bar but quickly realizes he is not lovable enough to keep the customers coming back for more.
65	17	"My Brother's Keeper"	Jay Sandrich	Dick Clair and Jenna McMahon	October 27, 1972	January 13, 1973	7215
Phyllis schemes to have her brother fall in love with Mary, but her plans go awry when her brother and Rhoda click. Guest star: Robert Moore.
66	18	"The Georgette Story"	Peter Baldwin	Ed. Weinberger	November 3, 1972	January 20, 1973	7223
Mary and Rhoda decide it is time they have a heart-to-heart talk with Georgette, since it appears Ted is taking his new girlfriend way too much for granted.
67	19	"Romeo and Mary"	Peter Baldwin	Jim Mulholland and Mike Barrie	TBA	January 27, 1973	7220
Rhoda's boyfriend finds the perfect guy for Mary. Unfortunately, the guy is overzealous in his intent to marry Mary and will not take no for an answer. Guest star: Stuart Margolin.
68	20	"What Do You Say When the Boss Says 'I Love You'?"	Jay Sandrich	David Pollock and Elias Davis	TBA	February 3, 1973	7222
Lou realizes he is in over his head when the new boss at the station is a woman who promptly falls for him. Guest star: Lois Nettleton.
69	21	"Murray Faces Life"	Jay Sandrich	Martin Cohan	TBA	February 10, 1973	7217
Murray sinks into a deep depression after he learns that a former writing classmate has won a Pulitzer Prize for journalism.
70	22	"Remembrance of Things Past"	Jay Sandrich	Dick Clair and Jenna McMahon	TBA	February 17, 1973	7224
Against her better judgment, Mary gets drawn into an affair with an ex-boyfriend who previously broke her heart. Guest star: Joseph Campanella.
71	23	"Put on a Happy Face"	Jay Sandrich	Marilyn Suzanne Miller and Monica Johnson	December 8, 1972	February 24, 1973	7221
Once Mary gets nominated for a Teddy Award, everything starts going disastrously wrong at work and the awards dinner.
72	24	"Mary Richards and the Incredible Plant Lady"	John C. Chulay	Martin Cohan	December 22, 1972	March 3, 1973	7225
Mary and Rhoda's friendship is strained after Rhoda borrows money to set up her new plant store but does not pay Mary back. Guest starring Louise Lasser as Anne Adams at the bank, and Craig T. Nelson as Charlie. Last appearance of: The 1966 CBS in Color logo.

=== Season 4 (1973–1974) ===
- Consisted of 24 half-hour episodes airing on CBS.
- Recurring Character Debuts: Sue Ann Nivens.
- This was Valerie Harper's final season before leaving to star in a spin-off called Rhoda.

No. overall	No. in season	Title	Directed by	Written by	Film date	Original release date	Prod. code
73	1	"The Lars Affair"	Jay Sandrich	Ed. Weinberger	July 20, 1973	September 15, 1973	7315
Phyllis discovers that her husband is having an affair with Sue Ann Nivens, the star of WJM's "Happy Homemaker Show". First appearance of Betty White. In 1997, TV Guide ranked this episode number 27 on its list of the 100 Greatest Episodes.
74	2	"Angels in the Snow"	Jay Sandrich	Monica Johnson and Marilyn Suzanne Miller	July 13, 1973	September 22, 1973	7306
Ignoring the advice of her friends and co-workers, Mary dates a man seven years younger than herself. Guest star: Peter Strauss
75	3	"Rhoda's Sister Gets Married"	Jerry Belson	Karyl Geld	TBA	September 29, 1973	7309
Mary and Rhoda fly to New York for Rhoda's younger sister's wedding, but Rhoda's mother is afraid that Rhoda is overly envious of her sibling.
76	4	"The Lou and Edie Story"	Jay Sandrich	Treva Silverman	TBA	October 6, 1973	7301
A heartbroken Lou announces that he and his wife Edie are having marital problems, and that a counselor has suggested a trial separation. First appearance of Priscilla Morrill.
77	5	"Hi There, Sports Fans"	Jay Sandrich	Jerry Mayer	TBA	October 13, 1973	7302
When Mary asks Lou for more responsibility in the newsroom, he assigns her the task of hiring a new sportscaster, but first she must fire the old one. Guest stars Richard Gautier and John Gabriel.
78	6	"Father's Day"	Jay Sandrich	Ed. Weinberger	TBA	October 20, 1973	7303
Ted is anxious and agitated as he prepares to meet his long-lost father.
79	7	"Son of "But Seriously, Folks""	Jay Sandrich	Phil Mishkin	TBA	October 27, 1973	7305
One of Mary's ex-boyfriends gets a job in the newsroom and attempts to rekindle their old flame. Jerry Van Dyke returns as "Wes Callison".
80	8	"Lou's First Date"	Jay Sandrich	Ed. Weinberger and Stan Daniels	September 21, 1973	November 3, 1973	7312
Mary tries to find a suitable date for Lou to attend the Teddy Awards banquet. The date is less than desirable and to make matters worse, Edie also attends the banquet with a date of her own.
81	9	"Love Blooms at Hemples"	Jay Sandrich	Sybil Adelman and Barbara Gallagher	September 28, 1973	November 10, 1973	7308
Rhoda falls madly in love with one of the Hemples' heirs, but she is clueless as to how he really feels about her.
82	10	"The Dinner Party"	Jay Sandrich	Ed. Weinberger	October 5, 1973	November 17, 1973	7321
Mary meets a congresswoman (Irene Tedrow), who accepts a casual invitation for dinner. An unexpected guest, an ill-timed preparation of Veal Prince Orloff, and Lou's ravenous appetite cause the evening to continue Mary's string of terrible parties. Guest star: Henry Winkler.
83	11	"Just Friends"	Nancy Walker	William Wood	October 19, 1973	November 24, 1973	7304
When a depressed Lou starts having dinner at Mary's every night, she quickly decides to reconcile him with Edie.
84	12	"We Want Baxter"	Jay Sandrich	David Lloyd	July 27, 1973	December 1, 1973	7314
Ted quits his job at WJM to pursue a political career after Phyllis convinces him that he would make an ideal city councilman.
85	13	"I Gave at the Office"	Jay Sandrich	Don Reo and Allan Katz	November 02, 1973	December 8, 1973	7307
Mary hires Murray's daughter for a part-time job in the newsroom—and winds up regretting it. Guest star: Bruce Boxleitner
86	14	"Almost a Nun's Story"	Jay Sandrich	Ed. Weinberger and Stan Daniels	November 09, 1973	December 15, 1973	7318
Georgette decides to become a nun after catching Ted kissing another woman in his dressing room.
87	15	"Happy Birthday, Lou!"	George Tyne	David Lloyd	October 26, 1973	December 22, 1973	7319
Mary plans a surprise party for Lou's birthday, only to find out too late that he hates birthday parties. Mary states Lou was born in 1925.
88	16	"WJM Tries Harder"	Jay Sandrich	Karyl Geld	November 16, 1973	January 5, 1974	7316
Mary starts to have doubts about WJM's relatively small-time operations when she dates the anchorman from the Twin Cities' top-rated station.
89	17	"Cottage for Sale"	Jay Sandrich	George Atkins	TBA	January 12, 1974	7311
Phyllis gets her real estate license and targets a reluctant Lou as her first client.
90	18	"The Co-Producers"	Jay Sandrich	David Pollock and Elias Davis	TBA	January 19, 1974	7322
Mary and Rhoda are thrilled with the opportunity to produce a new show for WJM, until they learn the show must star Sue Ann and Ted, who quickly make things difficult.
91	19	"Best of Enemies"	Jay Sandrich	Marilyn Suzanne Miller and Monica Johnson	December 7, 1973	January 26, 1974	7317
Mary and Rhoda's friendship takes serious damage when Rhoda reveals a secret about Mary's past to the office.
92	20	"Better Late...That's a Pun...Than Never"	John C. Chulay	Treva Silverman	January 11, 1974	February 2, 1974	7323
Mary writes a humorous obituary as a joke, but when it is mistakenly read on the air, she is suspended from the newsroom.
93	21	"Ted Baxter Meets Walter Cronkite"	Jay Sandrich	Ed. Weinberger	January 18, 1974	February 9, 1974	7324
After winning his first Teddy Award, Ted meets his idol, Walter Cronkite, and assumes that he is on his way to a network career.
94	22	"Lou's Second Date"	Jerry London	Ed. Weinberger	January 25, 1974	February 16, 1974	7326
Lou and Rhoda begin dating casually, and everyone—especially Mary—wonders how serious the relationship is turning. Valerie Harper's final appearance as a regular cast member.
95	23	"Two Wrongs Don't Make a Writer"	Nancy Walker	David Lloyd	February 1, 1974	February 23, 1974	7325
Ted joins Mary's night school class in creative writing and plagiarizes Mary's assignment.
96	24	"I Was a Single for WJM"	Mel Ferber	Treva Silverman	February 08, 1974	March 2, 1974	7327
Mary begins frequenting a singles bar to research a news special. When they air from the bar live, they encounter disastrous results. Penny Marshall guest stars.

=== Season 5 (1974–1975) ===
- Consisted of 24 half-hour episodes airing on CBS.
- This was Cloris Leachman's final season before leaving to star in a spinoff called Phyllis.

No. overall	No. in season	Title	Directed by	Written by	Film date	Original release date	Prod. code
97	1	"Will Mary Richards Go to Jail?"	Jay Sandrich	Ed. Weinberger and Stan Daniels	August 9, 1974	September 14, 1974	4014
When Mary refuses to reveal a source, she is found in contempt of court and is sent to jail, where she befriends two prostitutes.
98	2	"Not Just Another Pretty Face"	Jay Sandrich	Ed. Weinberger and Stan Daniels	June 21, 1974	September 21, 1974	4006
Mary dates gorgeous ski instructor Paul Van Dillen (Robert Wolders), but reconsiders the relationship when she realizes they have little in common.
99	3	"You Sometimes Hurt the One You Hate"	Jackie Cooper	David Lloyd	June 07, 1974	September 28, 1974	4003
Mary and Lou clash over his violent streaks, especially after he injures Ted for another on-air gaffe. Lou changes his ways, but when Ted takes advantage of the situation, Mary wants the old Lou back.
100	4	"Lou and That Woman"	Jay Sandrich	David Lloyd	TBA	October 5, 1974	4007
Lou is in heaven when he starts dating a fantastic lounge singer (Sheree North), but has second thoughts when she reveals she has been with a number of men.
101	5	"The Outsider"	Peter Bonerz	Jack Winter	TBA	October 12, 1974	4002
The gang is displeased when Lou hires a young consultant, named Bob Larson, to raise ratings for the newscast. Just as Larson's strict methods seem to work and the staff slowly warms up to him, he reveals another surprise. Guest star: Richard Masur
102	6	"I Love a Piano"	Jay Sandrich	Treva Silverman	TBA	October 19, 1974	4001
Murray meets an attractive divorcee at one of Mary's parties, and the gang is rattled as Murray flirts with having an affair with her. Guest star: Barbara Barrie
103	7	"A New Sue Ann"	Jay Sandrich	David Lloyd	September 20, 1974	October 26, 1974	4018
Sue Ann is charmed when a hometown acquaintance (Linda Kelsey) of Mary's comes on as an assistant to her show. But things turn ugly when the young woman dates the station manager and aims for Sue Ann's job.
104	8	"Menage-a-Phyllis"	Jay Sandrich	Treva Silverman	August 23, 1974	November 2, 1974	4010
Mary meets Phyllis' hunky platonic friend Mike (John Saxon) with whom she attends cultural events instead of Lars. When Mike shows an interest in Mary, Phyllis sees green.
105	9	"Not a Christmas Story"	John C. Chulay	Ed. Weinberger and Stan Daniels	August 2, 1974	November 9, 1974	4004
The gang is furious at each other over an office dispute. When they are all snowed in at the office, they spend a tense evening on the set of Sue Ann's Christmas dinner special.
106	10	"What Are Friends For?"	Alan Rafkin	David Lloyd	June 14, 1974	November 16, 1974	4009
Mary and Sue Ann have an unusual time bonding when they both attend a broadcasters' conference in Chicago.
107	11	"A Boy's Best Friend"	Mary Tyler Moore	David Lloyd	TBA	November 23, 1974	4012
Ted is elated when his mother announces she will be getting married. When she decides against marriage after all, Ted determines he must meet her "gentlemen friend" to learn his intentions.
108	12	"A Son for Murray"	Jay Sandrich	Ed. Weinberger and Stan Daniels	TBA	November 30, 1974	4019
The gang is unwillingly dragged in when Murray and Marie fight over whether or not to try for another child, specifically a boy. Ultimately, they adopt a boy from Vietnam.
109	13	"Neighbors"	James Burrows and John C. Chulay	Ziggy Steinberg	TBA	December 7, 1974	4016
Lou moves upstairs into Rhoda's old apartment and creates tension with Mary when the line between work and home is breached.
110	14	"A Girl Like Mary"	Jay Sandrich	Ann Gibbs and Joel Kimmel	November 15, 1974	December 14, 1974	4015
Lou auditions applicants for a new female commentator. Sue Ann and Mary both audition—and fail spectacularly. Guest starring Rosalind Cash.
111	15	"An Affair to Forget"	Jay Sandrich	Ed. Weinberger and Stan Daniels	TBA	December 21, 1974	4008
Mary is promoted to producer, catching Ted's eye. She then becomes increasingly aggravated as Ted spreads rumors suggesting they are dating.
112	16	"Mary Richards: Producer"	Norman Campbell	David Lloyd	TBA	January 4, 1975	4022
Frustrated that Lou is not allowing her to exercise the full authority of her recently acquired title of producer, Mary convinces him to let her produce the show solo. Although Lou is frustrated at first, he admits the show "didn't stink".
113	17	"The System"	Jay Sandrich	Ed. Weinberger and Stan Daniels	TBA	January 11, 1975	4026
Lou has a string of bad bets in the new NFL season, while amateur Ted gets lucky. Lou tries Ted's system, but though successful, finds all the fun has gone out of betting.
114	18	"Phyllis Whips Inflation"	Jay Sandrich	Stan Daniels and Ed. Weinberger	November 8, 1974	January 18, 1975	4023
With everyone feeling the crunch of inflation, Phyllis tries to find a job and Mary tries to coax a raise out of Mr. Grant. Final appearance of Cloris Leachman as a regular cast member. Guest star: Doris Roberts
115	19	"The Shame of the Cities"	Jay Sandrich	Story by : Michael Elias and Arnie Kogen; Teleplay by : Michael Elias	TBA	January 25, 1975	4013
Lou is inspired to return to investigative reporting. When he has no luck turning up any worthwhile news Mary convinces him to produce a positive documentary instead—with poor results. Final appearance of Sheree North as Charlene Maguire.
116	20	"Marriage Minneapolis Style"	Jay Sandrich	Pamela Russell	TBA	February 1, 1975	4017
After Murray and Marie celebrate their 20th anniversary, Ted impulsively proposes to Georgette on air—and quickly regrets it.
117	21	"You Try to Be a Nice Guy"	Jay Sandrich	Michael Leeson	January 10, 1975	February 8, 1975	4028
Sherry, the hooker Mary met in jail, resurfaces to ask Mary to be a character witness. Mary then tries to help Sherry find a less risqué line of work, and ends up modeling a shocking dress of Sherry's design. Guest Star: Barbara Colby
118	22	"You Can't Lose 'em All"	Marjorie Mullen	David Lloyd	TBA	February 15, 1975	4025
It is Teddy Awards time and Ted feels upset when he is not even nominated after last year's win, while Lou feels worse when he is selected for a career award he despises. Guest star: Fred Grandy
119	23	"Ted Baxter's Famous Broadcasters' School"	Jay Sandrich	Michael Zinberg	January 24, 1975	February 22, 1975	4024
A scam artist disappears with the money Ted had invested to start a broadcasting school. Mary, Lou, and Murray agree to serve as the faculty to help Ted fulfill his obligations, but are not sure how to proceed when only one student shows up (Leonard Frey) and insists that classes be held regardless. A blind date Mary unwillingly agrees to go out with (Bernie Kopell) at Ida Morgenstern's behest adds to the farcical resolution.
120	24	"Anyone Who Hates Kids and Dogs"	Jay Sandrich	Jerry Mayer	TBA	March 8, 1975	4029
Mary thinks the divorced man she has been dating may be the one. The only problem is, despite her efforts, she dislikes his obnoxious 12-year-old son, and the feeling seems to be mutual. Guest stars: Laurence Luckinbill, Lee Montgomery, Mabel Albertson, Carole King (credited as Carole Larkey)

=== Season 6 (1975–1976) ===
- Consisted of 24 half-hour episodes airing on CBS.

No. overall	No. in season	Title	Directed by	Written by	Film date	Original release date	Prod. code
121	1	"Edie Gets Married"	Jay Sandrich	Bob Ellison	TBA	September 13, 1975	5008
Lou and the gang are taken aback when Edie announces she is remarrying. Hesitant to attend the wedding, with Mary's support, Lou makes peace with Edie and wishes her well.
122	2	"Mary Moves Out"	Jay Sandrich	David Lloyd	June 20, 1975	September 20, 1975	5005
Missing Rhoda and Phyllis, Mary feels she has fallen into a rut. She decides to move to a high-rise apartment (Riverside Plaza), and with the help of the gang it soon starts to feel like home.
123	3	"Mary's Father"	Jay Sandrich	Earl Pomerantz	TBA	September 27, 1975	5004
Mary works with a handsome Catholic priest on a documentary. He announces that he is considering leaving the priesthood and Mary is mortified when her intuition tells her that he may be in love with her. Guest star: Ed Flanders
124	4	"Murray in Love"	Jay Sandrich	David Lloyd	TBA	October 4, 1975	5006
Murray realizes he is in love with Mary, who has to let him down gently. Ted resolves to assist Mary in her problem with some overly friendly neighbors. Guest stars: Penny Marshall and Mary Kay Place
125	5	"Ted's Moment of Glory"	Jay Sandrich	Charles Lee and Gig Henry	TBA	October 11, 1975	5007
Ted lands a new job hosting a game show in New York. The gang unexpectedly finds they will miss him after all and Lou sets out to make him stay. Guest star: Dian Parkinson
126	6	"Mary's Aunt"	Jay Sandrich	David Lloyd	TBA	October 18, 1975	5001
Mary's dynamic journalist Aunt Flo is in town. Mary is excited to introduce her to Lou, but they clash in a battle of egos only to find more common ground than expected. Guest star: Eileen Heckart
127	7	"Chuckles Bites the Dust"	Joan Darling	David Lloyd	August 22, 1975	October 25, 1975	5009
Chuckles the Clown is killed in an absurd accident and Mary is appalled at the reaction of her coworkers, who make a litany of corny jokes about the death. At the funeral, everyone promises Mary they will cease and desist, but during the service it is Mary who is unable to control her reactions. In 1997, TV Guide ranked this episode as the greatest episode of television of all time. In 2009, it moved to No. 3.
128	8	"Mary's Delinquent"	Jay Sandrich	Mary Kay Place and Valerie Curtin	June 13, 1975	November 1, 1975	5002
Mary becomes a "big sister" to a juvenile delinquent and is put in a compromising position when the girl steals some money from the office. Guest star: Mackenzie Phillips
129	9	"Ted's Wedding"	Jay Sandrich	David Lloyd	September 12, 1975	November 8, 1975	5010
When Ted makes another insincere proposal of marriage during dinner, Georgette insists that they do marry, right then and there in Mary's apartment. A grungy Murray, Sue Ann's last minute accessorizing, and a minister in tennis attire make for a very comical wedding. Guest star: John Ritter
130	10	"Lou Douses an Old Flame"	Jay Sandrich	David Lloyd	September 19, 1975	November 15, 1975	5014
Lou has mixed feelings of hope and revenge when contacted by an old girlfriend who sent him a "Dear John" letter 30 years previously. Mary hosts a post-wedding bachelor party for Ted. Guest star: Beverly Garland
131	11	"Mary Richards Falls in Love"	Jay Sandrich	Ed. Weinberger and Stan Daniels	September 26, 1975	November 22, 1975	5011
Mary falls deeply for her latest boyfriend, Joe Warner, but he cannot say "I love you" to her. She is devastated when she learns why. Mary and Rhoda speak on the phone about their respective love interests (both named "Joe"). Guest stars: Valerie Harper, Ted Bessell, David Groh and Beth Howland.
132	12	"Ted's Tax Refund"	Marjorie Mullen	Bob Ellison	TBA	November 29, 1975	5012
Ted gets a large tax refund and vows to change his miserly ways by giving generous gifts to the gang. When he is audited by the IRS, he tries to muster up support for false deductions.
133	13	"The Happy Homemaker Takes Lou Home"	James Burrows	David Lloyd	October 31, 1975	December 6, 1975	5015
When Prince Charles has to cancel his appearance on "Talk of the Town", Mary struggles to find a replacement guest. Mary reluctantly helps set up Sue Ann and Lou on a date, which ends with an unusual twist.
134	14	"One Boyfriend Too Many"	Jay Sandrich	David Lloyd	TBA	December 13, 1975	5017
While the romance between Mary and Joe Warner is going well, when Mary's old boyfriend Dan Whitfield comes back to town, Mary is not sure where her heart lies.
135	15	"What Do You Want to Do When You Produce?"	Jay Sandrich	Shelly Nelbert and Craig Alan Hafner	TBA	December 20, 1975	5013
Murray accepts a lucrative position producing Sue Ann's "Happy Homemaker" show. It ends up being a humiliating experience for Murray that he is willing to bear until Mary reveals that his wife is distraught over the change.
136	16	"Not With My Wife, I Don't"	Jay Sandrich	Bob Ellison	TBA	January 3, 1976	5016
When Georgette threatens to leave Ted over problems in the bedroom, he gets help from a psychiatrist. Murray researches a story on availability of guns.
137	17	"The Seminar"	Stuart Margolin	James McDonald and Robert Gerlach	October 24, 1975	January 10, 1976	5003
Mary and Lou attend a seminar in Washington, D.C. Lou expects to take Mary on a night on the town with his old friends, but when his contacts seem to be a bust, Mary makes her own plans. Meanwhile, Ted is in charge of the news room. Guest stars: Betty Ford and Dabney Coleman
138	18	"Once I Had a Secret Love"	Jay Sandrich	Pat Nardo and Gloria Banta	December 5, 1975	January 17, 1976	5018
Lou has a drunken one-night stand with Sue Ann and swears Mary to secrecy. When he finds out she told Murray, Lou declares his friendship with her over.
139	19	"Menage-a-Lou"	Jay Sandrich	Bob Ellison	TBA	January 24, 1976	5020
Lou's old girlfriend Charlene is in town so Mary invites her to another disastrous party where Lou makes a scene in front of Charlene's new boyfriend. Lou asks Mary's neighbor to join him on a double date with Charlene to make her jealous. Guest stars: Penny Marshall, Janis Paige and Jeff Conaway
140	20	"Murray Takes a Stand"	Jay Sandrich	David Lloyd	TBA	January 31, 1976	5019
The new station owner's policies infuriate Murray so he calls the owner at home with an irate message. The next morning the owner tells Lou to fire Murray. The gang has to band together to get Murray's job back.
141	21	"Mary's Aunt Returns"	Jay Sandrich	David Lloyd	TBA	February 7, 1976	5021
Aunt Flo returns to Minneapolis to collaborate with Lou on a documentary. When they have different approaches on the material, they hold a competition. Ted plays both sides to be the narrator. Guest star: Eileen Heckart
142	22	"A Reliable Source"	Jay Sandrich	Richard M. Powell	January 30, 1976	February 21, 1976	5023
Mary threatens to resign when Lou runs a damaging story on a politician with ties to organized crime, and who is also Mary's trusted personal friend.
143	23	"Sue Ann Falls in Love"	Doug Rogers	Bob Ellison	February 6, 1976	February 28, 1976	5024
Sue Ann falls for a hunky outdoorsman. On the eve of the Teddy Awards, he makes a pass at Mary, who is forced to tell Sue Ann just before she wins the award.
144	24	"Ted and the Kid"	Marjorie Mullen	Bob Ellison	TBA	March 6, 1976	5022
Ted confides in Mary that he and Georgette are having trouble conceiving a child. The couple adopt 12-year-old David, and subsequently Georgette announces she has become pregnant after all. Guest star: Robbie Rist

=== Season 7 (1976–1977) ===
- Consisted of 24 half-hour episodes airing on CBS.

No. overall	No. in season	Title	Directed by	Written by	Film date	Original release date	Prod. code
145	1	"Mary Midwife"	Jay Sandrich	David Lloyd	TBA	September 25, 1976	6001
After Lou and Mary feud about his weight, he shows up to spoil Mary's dinner party. When Georgette goes into labor, Mary and Lou must cooperate to deliver the Baxters' daughter, whom they name Mary Lou.
146	2	"Mary the Writer"	James Burrows	Burt Prelutsky	June 25, 1976	October 2, 1976	6006
Mary asks Lou to give an honest opinion on an article she wrote and becomes upset when Lou thinks it "stinks". She goes so far as to lie about it being accepted by Reader's Digest.
147	3	"Sue Ann's Sister"	Jay Sandrich	David Lloyd	July 23, 1976	October 9, 1976	6005
Sue Ann's visiting sister gets an offer to do a rival cooking show in Minneapolis. This sends Sue Ann into a depression. The gang comes to her bedside to cheer her up, and the audience is treated to a view of the happy homemaker's tawdry boudoir. Guest star: Pat Priest
148	4	"What's Wrong with Swimming?"	Marjorie Mullen	David Lloyd	TBA	October 16, 1976	6002
Mary battles Lou to hire a female swimmer, B.J., as the station's sportscaster. When B.J. ends up only reporting on swimming and diving, ignoring important stories about local football and basketball, Mary must take responsibility for the situation.
149	5	"Ted's Change of Heart"	Jay Sandrich	Earl Pomerantz	TBA	October 23, 1976	6010
After having a heart attack on the air, Ted decides life is incredibly precious and takes an incredibly positive view of life. His attitude is infectious among the new staff, but how long will it last?
150	6	"One Producer Too Many"	Jay Sandrich	Bob Ellison	August 27, 1976	October 30, 1976	6008
Lou makes Murray a co-producer after he gets an offer from another station. Mary is not happy about this situation and there seems no way for Lou to resolve the problem.
151	7	"My Son, the Genius"	Jay Sandrich	Bob Ellison	TBA	November 6, 1976	6003
When Ted and Georgette's son David (Robbie Rist) is having trouble in school, they bring him to a psychologist and discover he is a genius with an I.Q. of 160. David suddenly becomes a brat and his parents must deal with his new behavior.
152	8	"Mary Gets a Lawyer"	Jay Sandrich	Burt Prelutsky	TBA	November 13, 1976	6014
A grand jury sends Mary to trial for contempt of court for not revealing a news source. Mary's lawyer, a friend of Lou, is taken with her, but when he discovers she is not interested, he goes on a bender, and it seems as though Mary's defense will be ruined. Guest stars: John McMartin, Richard Kline.
153	9	"Lou Proposes"	Jay Sandrich	David Lloyd	TBA	November 20, 1976	6015
Mary's Aunt, Flo Meridith, is visiting town again, and after her usual altercations with Lou, he decides to ask Flo to marry him.
154	10	"Murray Can't Lose"	Jay Sandrich	David Lloyd	October 8, 1976	November 27, 1976	6012
A rumor is going around that Murray is a sure thing to win at this year's Teddy awards. Mary is put in charge of entertainment at the ceremony and has Georgette perform the musical number "Steam Heat".
155	11	"Mary's Insomnia"	James Burrows	David Lloyd	September 17, 1976	December 4, 1976	6009
Mary uses sleeping pills to help her insomnia and Mr. Grant is concerned when she becomes dependent on them.
156	12	"Ted's Temptation"	Harry Mastrogeorge	Bob Ellison	TBA	December 11, 1976	6013
Mary, Murray and Ted attend a convention in Los Angeles. An attractive young journalist tries to seduce Ted. Guest star: Trisha Noble.
157	13	"Look at Us, We're Walking"	Jay Sandrich	Bob Ellison	TBA	December 25, 1976	6004
Mary and Lou ask the new station manager for a raise and threaten to quit otherwise. Guest star: David Ogden Stiers.
158	14	"The Critic"	Martin Cohan	David Lloyd	TBA	January 8, 1977	6017
A very negative critic is hired by the station manager to do a spot on The Six O'clock News, and immediately attacks Minneapolis's population as a whole. Lou wants Mary to go out with him in a futile attempt to get him to put a more positive spin on his reviews. Guest stars: Eric Braeden, David Ogden Stiers.
159	15	"Lou's Army Reunion"	Jay Sandrich	Bob Ellison	TBA	January 15, 1977	6016
Lou wants to return a favor to an old Army buddy, but is upset when he asks for a date with Mary. Guest star: Alex Rocco
160	16	"The Ted and Georgette Show"	Jay Sandrich	David Lloyd	November 19, 1976	January 22, 1977	6018
Ted and Georgette do a show on WJM that becomes a hit, but Georgette would rather stay at home taking care of her family. Guest stars: David Ogden Stiers and Alex Henteloff.
161	17	"Sue Ann Gets the Ax"	Jay Sandrich	Bob Ellison	December 3, 1976	January 29, 1977	6019
Sue Ann Niven's Happy Homemaker show is canceled. After being given a series of demeaning jobs at WJM, she's hired to work in the newsroom.
162	18	"Hail the Conquering Gordy"	Jay Sandrich	Earl Pomerantz	TBA	February 5, 1977	6020
Gordy, the former WJM weatherman, is now a network news star. In town for a visit, the gang throws him a party, and jealous Ted is hoping for a co-host position with Gordy in New York.
163	19	"Mary and the Sexagenarian"	Jay Sandrich	Les Charles and Glen Charles	December 17, 1976	February 12, 1977	6021
Mary agrees to go out on a date with an older man, who turns out to be Murray's father. Guest star: Lew Ayres.
164	20	"Murray Ghosts for Ted"	Jay Sandrich	David Lloyd	TBA	February 19, 1977	6025
Ted is unable to write an article requested by a newspaper, so hires Murray to write it for him, insisting that he not reveal the arrangement. When the article gains attention from the Governor and is to be reprinted in Reader's Digest, Mary and Lou want Ted to come clean. Guest star: Helen Hunt
165	21	"Mary's Three Husbands"	Jay Sandrich	Bob Ellison	January 14, 1977	February 26, 1977	6023
After a long day, Lou, Murray and Ted have a drink and fantasize what it would be like for each of them to be married to Mary. Lou's fantasy takes place on their would-be golden anniversary and aged versions of all four characters are seen.
166	22	"Mary's Big Party"	Jay Sandrich	Bob Ellison	January 28, 1977	March 5, 1977	6026
Congresswoman Geddes from Episode 82 ("The Dinner Party") asks Mary to entertain Johnny Carson, who is visiting Minneapolis. Mary thinks for once she can have a party which is not a disaster. As the gang awaits the celebrity's arrival in Mary's apartment, there is a power failure and no candles or working flashlights are to be found. The guests recall a series of Mary's bad parties through flashbacks. Guest star: Johnny Carson. Valerie Harper and Henry Winkler appear in flashback scenes. Irene Tedrow reprises her role as Congresswomen Margaret Geddes.
167	23	"Lou Dates Mary"	Jay Sandrich	David Lloyd	January 7, 1977	March 12, 1977	6024
At the age of 37, and after another disappointing date, Mary believes she may never meet a good man. Georgette suggests that Mary date Lou. She manages to ask him out, but can the uncomfortable pair hit it off romantically?
168	24	"The Last Show"	Jay Sandrich	James L. Brooks, Allan Burns, Ed. Weinberger, Stan Daniels, David Lloyd & Bob Ellison	February 04, 1977	March 19, 1977	6027
The new station manager fires Lou, Mary, Murray, and Sue Ann, but decides to keep Ted on. Lou flies in a couple of old friends to surprise a distraught Mary. After watching their last broadcast together, Mary shares a very emotional farewell in the newsroom with her coworkers and friends and for her, the series ends on a tearful but positive note.
