= List of awards and nominations received by The Mary Tyler Moore Show =

The Mary Tyler Moore Show awards and nominations
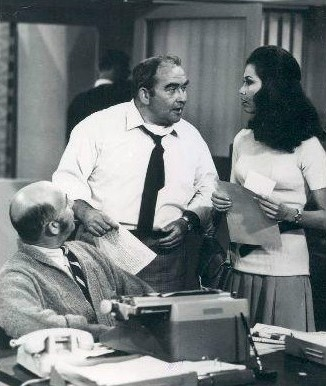
- Ed Asner and Mary Tyler Moore (pictured) won various awards for their performances.
Awards and nominations
Award	Wins	Nominations
Directors Guild of America Awards	0	5
Emmy Awards	29	67
Golden Globe Awards	3	22
Humanitas Prize	1	1
OFTA Television Awards	1	1
Peabody Award	1	1
Television Critics Association Awards	0	1
TV Land Awards	4	13
Writers Guild of America Awards	1	10

Totals (Note: Certain award groups do not simply award one winner. They acknowledge several different recipients, have runners-up, and have third place. Since this is a specific recognition and is different from losing an award, runner-up mentions are considered wins in this award tally. For simplification and to avoid errors, each award in this list has been presumed to have had a prior nomination.)
- Wins: 41
- Nominations: 121

The Mary Tyler Moore Show, often referred to as Mary Tyler Moore, is an American television sitcom series that aired on CBS from September 19, 1970 to March 19, 1977. Created by James L. Brooks and Allan Burns, the show follows the life of Mary Richards (Mary Tyler Moore), a single woman in her thirties working as the associate producer, later producer, of a local news station WJM. Working at the news station is her gruff boss Lou Grant (Ed Asner), newswriter Murray Slaughter (Gavin McLeod), and the vain and nit-witted anchorman Ted Baxter (Ted Knight). Mary rents a studio apparent from acquaintance and landlady Phyllis Lindstrom (Cloris Leachman), and neighbors her best friend Rhoda Morgenstern (Valerie Harper). Other major characters in the series include Sue Ann Nivens (Betty White), the host of The Happy Homemaker show, and Ted's girlfriend, later wife, Georgette Franklin (Georgia Engel).

Mary Tyler Moore has garnered critical acclaim for its honest and serious portrayal of a single working woman in the 1970s. Since its debut, the series has been nominated for 67 Primetime Emmy Awards (winning 29) and 22 Golden Globe Awards (winning three) among others. Several cast members won Emmys or Golden Globes, including Moore (5), Asner (5), Harper (3) and others with multiple wins.

== Awards and nominations ==
=== Directors Guild of America Awards ===
Presented by the Directors Guild of America since 1938, The Directors Guild of America Award honors excellence in the field of direction. The Mary Tyler Moore received five nominations for the award for Outstanding Directorial Achievement in Comedy Series, four out of five for work by Jay Sandrich.

Year	Category	Nominee(s)	Episodes(s)	Result	Ref
1971	Outstanding Directorial Achievement in Comedy Series	Jay Sandrich	for "Baby Sitcom"	Nominated	
1973	Outstanding Directorial Achievement in Comedy Series	Jay Sandrich	for "Lou's First Date"	Nominated	
1974	Outstanding Directorial Achievement in Comedy Series	Jay Sandrich	for "Will Mary Richards Go to Jail?"	Nominated	
1975	Outstanding Directorial Achievement in Comedy Series	Joan Darling	for "Chuckles Bites the Dust"	Nominated	
1976	Outstanding Directorial Achievement in Comedy Series	Jay Sandrich	for "Murray Can't Lose"	Nominated	

=== Emmy Awards ===
The Primetime Emmy Award is an annual accolade presented by the Academy of Television Arts & Sciences for outstanding achievement in American prime time television programming. The Primetime Emmy Award recognizes outstanding achievement in aspects such as acting, writing, and direction while the more technical aspects such as cinematography, casting and guest acting performances in television, are awarded at the Creative Arts Emmy Awards. During its tenure, The Mary Tyler Moore Show received 67 nominations - all but five major, winning 29 of them, a record held until Frasier won its 30th Emmy Award in 2002. The show won the award for Outstanding Comedy Series three times for 1975 to 1977. Out of the entire cast, Mary Tyler Moore, Ed Asner, and Valerie Harper received nominations for every year they were on the show. Mary Tyler Moore won the Outstanding Lead Actress in a Comedy Series, known as Outstanding Continued Performance by an Actress in a Leading Role in a Comedy Series in 1971-1973 and Best Lead Actress in a Comedy Series in 1974, three times. Moore also won the Primetime Super Emmy Award for Actress of the Year - Series in 1974. The series won the award for Outstanding Performance by an Actress in a Supporting Role in Comedy six consecutive times from 1971 to 1976. Valerie Harper received the award three times from 1971 to 1973. Cloris Leachman won the award in 1974 and Betty White received the award in 1975 and 1976. Leachman also won the award for Outstanding Single Performance by a Supporting Actress in a Comedy or Drama Series in 1975. Ed Asner won the award for Outstanding Performance by an Actor in a Supporting Role in Comedy three times in 1971, 1972 and 1975 while Ted Knight won the award twice in 1973 and 1976.

==== Primetime Emmy Awards ====
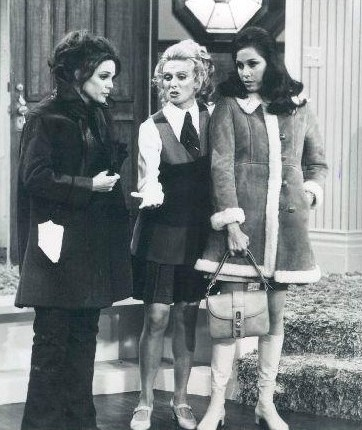
Valerie Harper, Cloris Leachman, and Mary Tyler Moore won several Emmy Awards for their performances on the series.

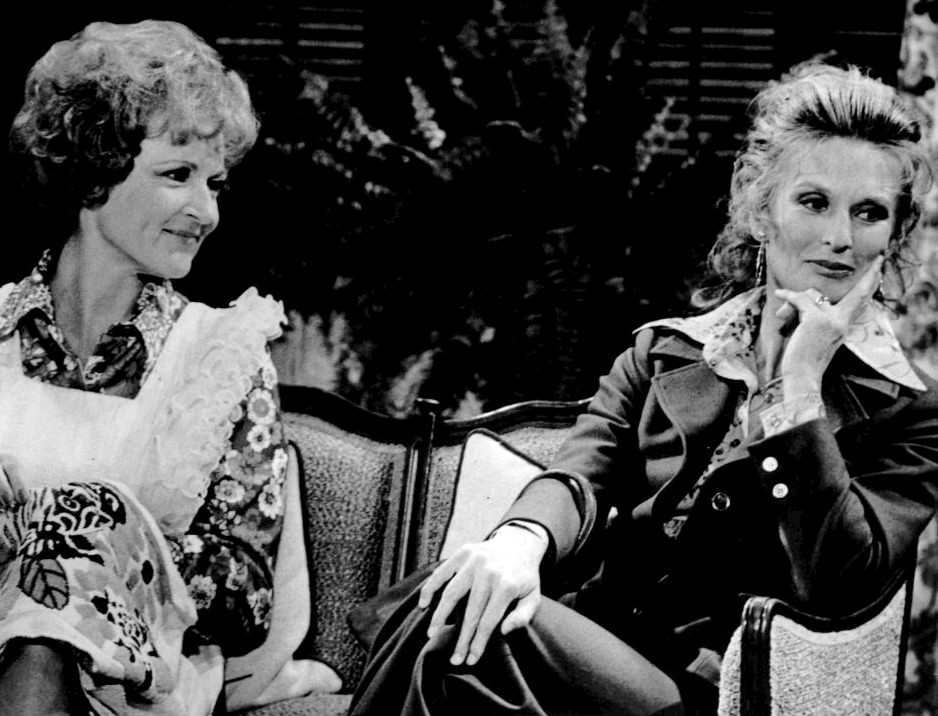
Betty White (pictured left) won two Emmy awards for her performance as Sue Ann Nivens

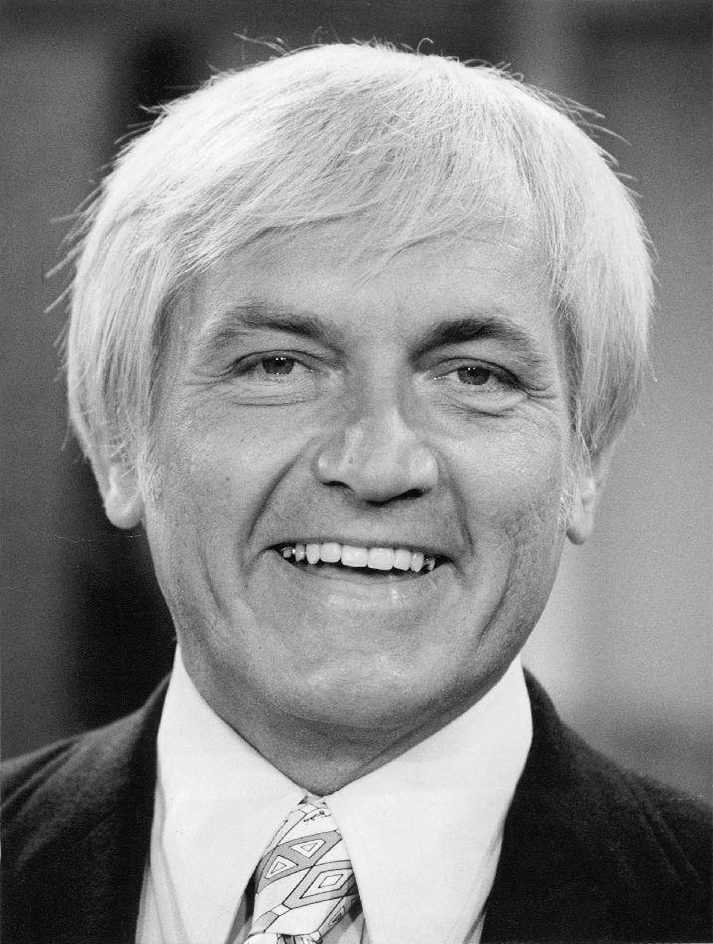
Ted Knight won two Emmy awards for his performance as Ted Baxter

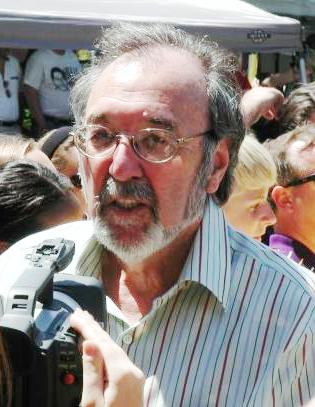
James L. Brooks, along with executive producers and creators of the series, won three Emmy awards for Outstanding Comedy Series

Year	Category	Nominee(s)	Episodes(s)	Result	Ref
1971	Outstanding Series − Comedy			Nominated	
1971	Outstanding New Series			Nominated	
1971	Outstanding Continued Performance by an Actress in a Leading Role in a Comedy Series	Mary Tyler Moore as "Mary Richards"		Nominated	
1971	Outstanding Performance by an Actor in a Supporting Role in Comedy	Ed Asner as "Lou Grant"		Won	
1971	Outstanding Performance by an Actor in a Supporting Role in Comedy	Valerie Harper as "Rhoda Morgenstern"		Won	
1971	Outstanding Directorial Achievement in Comedy	Jay Sandrich	for "Toulouse Lautrec is One of My Favorite Artists"	Won	
1971	Outstanding Directorial Achievement in Comedy	Alan Rafkin	for "Support Your Local Mother"	Nominated	
1971	Outstanding Writing Achievement in Comedy	James L. Brooks and Allan Burns	for "Support Your Local Mother"	Won	
1972	Outstanding Series − Comedy			Nominated	
1972	Outstanding Continued Performance by an Actress in a Leading Role in a Comedy Series	Mary Tyler Moore as "Mary Richards"		Nominated	
1972	Outstanding Performance by an Actor in a Supporting Role in Comedy	Ed Asner as "Lou Grant"		Won	
1972	Outstanding Performance by an Actor in a Supporting Role in Comedy	Ted Knight as "Ted Baxter"		Nominated	
1972	Outstanding Performance by an Actress in a Supporting Role in Comedy	Valerie Harper as "Rhoda Morgenstern"		Won	
1972	Outstanding Performance by an Actress in a Supporting Role in Comedy	Cloris Leachman as "Phyllis Lindstrom"		Nominated	
1972	Outstanding Directorial Achievement in Comedy	Jay Sandrich	for "Thoroughly Unmilitant Mary"	Nominated	
1972	Outstanding Directorial Achievement in Comedy	Peter Baldwin	for "Where There's Smoke, There's Rhoda"	Nominated	
1973	Outstanding Series − Comedy			Nominated	
1973	Outstanding Continued Performance by an Actress in a Leading Role in a Comedy Series	Mary Tyler Moore as "Mary Richards"		Won	
1973	Outstanding Performance by an Actor in a Supporting Role in Comedy	Ed Asner as "Lou Grant"		Nominated	
1973	Outstanding Performance by an Actor in a Supporting Role in Comedy	Ted Knight as "Ted Baxter"		Won	
1973	Outstanding Performance by an Actress in a Supporting Role in Comedy	Valerie Harper as "Rhoda Morgenstern"		Won	
1973	Outstanding Performance by an Actress in a Supporting Role in Comedy	Cloris Leachman as "Phyllis Lindstrom"		Nominated	
1973	Outstanding Directorial Achievement in Comedy	Jay Sandrich	for "It's Whether You Win Or Lose"	Won	
1973	Outstanding Writing Achievement in Comedy	James L. Brooks and Allan Burns	for "The Good-Time News"	Nominated	
1974	Outstanding Series − Comedy			Nominated	
1974	Best Lead Actress in a Comedy Series	Mary Tyler Moore as "Mary Richards"		Won	
1974	Best Supporting Actor in Comedy	Ed Asner as "Lou Grant"		Nominated	
1974	Best Supporting Actor in Comedy	Ted Knight as "Ted Baxter"		Nominated	
1974	Best Supporting Actress in Comedy	Valerie Harper as "Rhoda Morgenstern"		Nominated	
1974	Best Supporting Actress in Comedy	Cloris Leachman as "Phyllis Lindstrom"		Won	
1974	Best Directing in Comedy	Jay Sandrich	for "Lou's First Date"	Nominated	
1974	Best Writing in Comedy	Treva Silverman	for "The Lou And Edie Story"	Won	
1974	Actress of the Year - Series	Mary Tyler Moore as "Mary Richards"		Won	
1974	Writer of the Year - Series	Treva Silverman	for "The Lou and Edie Story"	Won	
1975	Outstanding Comedy Series			Won	
1975	Outstanding Lead Actress in a Comedy Series	Mary Tyler Moore as "Mary Richards"		Nominated	
1975	Outstanding Continuing Performance by a Supporting Actor in a Comedy Series	Ed Asner as "Lou Grant"		Won	
1975	Outstanding Continuing Performance by a Supporting Actor in a Comedy Series	Ted Knight as "Ted Baxter"		Nominated	
1975	Outstanding Continuing Performance by a Supporting Actress in a Comedy Series	Betty White as "Sue Ann Nivens"		Won	
1975	Outstanding Single Performance by a Supporting Actress in a Comedy or Drama Series	Cloris Leachman as "Phyllis Lindstrom"	for "Phyllis Whips Inflation"	Won	
1975	Outstanding Writing in a Comedy Series	David Lloyd	for "Lou and That Woman"	Nominated	
1975	Outstanding Writing in a Comedy Series	Ed Weinberger and Stan Daniels	for "Will Mary Richards Go to Jail?"	Won	
1976	Outstanding Comedy Series			Won	
1976	Outstanding Lead Actress in a Comedy Series	Mary Tyler Moore as "Mary Richards"		Won	
1976	Outstanding Continuing Performance by a Supporting Actor in a Comedy Series	Ed Asner as "Lou Grant"		Nominated	
1976	Outstanding Continuing Performance by a Supporting Actor in a Comedy Series	Ted Knight as "Ted Baxter"		Won	
1976	Outstanding Continuing Performance by a Supporting Actress in a Comedy Series	Betty White as "Sue Ann Nivens"		Won	
1976	Outstanding Continuing Performance by a Supporting Actress in a Comedy Series	Georgia Engel as "Georgette Baxter"		Nominated	
1976	Outstanding Single Performance by a Supporting Actress in a Comedy or Drama Series	Eileen Heckart as "Flo Meredith"	for "Mary's Aunt"	Nominated	
1976	Outstanding Directing for a Comedy Series	Joan Darling	for "Chuckles Bites the Dust"	Nominated	
1976	Outstanding Writing for a Comedy Series	David Lloyd	for "Chuckles Bites the Dust"	Won	
1977	Outstanding Comedy Series			Won	
1977	Outstanding Lead Actress in a Comedy Series	Mary Tyler Moore as "Mary Richards"		Nominated	
1977	Outstanding Continuing Performance by a Supporting Actor in a Comedy Series	Ed Asner as "Lou Grant"		Nominated	
1977	Outstanding Continuing Performance by a Supporting Actor in a Comedy Series	Ted Knight as "Ted Baxter"		Nominated	
1977	Outstanding Continuing Performance by a Supporting Actress in a Comedy Series	Betty White as "Sue Ann Nivens"		Nominated	
1977	Outstanding Continuing Performance by a Supporting Actress in a Comedy Series	Georgia Engel as "Georgette Baxter"		Nominated	
1977	Outstanding Single Performance by a Supporting Actress in a Comedy or Drama Series	Eileen Heckart as "Flo Meredith"	for "Lou Proposes"	Nominated	
1977	Outstanding Directing for a Comedy Series	Jay Sandrich	for "The Last Show"	Nominated	
1977	Outstanding Writing for a Comedy Series	Allan Burns, James L. Brooks, Ed. Weinberger, Stan Daniels, David Lloyd, and Bob Ellison	for "The Last Show"	Won	
1977	Outstanding Writing for a Comedy Series	David Lloyd	for "Mary Midwife"	Nominated	
1977	Outstanding Writing for a Comedy Series	Earl Pomerantz	for "Ted's Change of Heart"	Nominated	

==== Creative Arts Emmy Awards ====
Year	Category	Nominee(s)	Result	Ref
1973	Outstanding Achievement in Film Editing for Entertainment Programming - For a Series or a Single Program of a Series	Douglas Hines	Nominated	
1974	Best Film Editing for Entertainment Programming - For a Series or a Single Program of a Series	Douglas Hines and Bud S. Isaacs	Nominated	
1975	Outstanding Film Editing for Entertainment Programming for a Series - For a Single Episode of a Comedy Series	Douglas Hines	Won	
1976	Outstanding Film Editing for Entertainment Programming for a Series - For a Single Episode of a Comedy Series	Douglas Hines	Nominated	
1977	Outstanding Film Editing in a Comedy Series	Douglas Hines	Won	

=== Golden Globe Awards ===
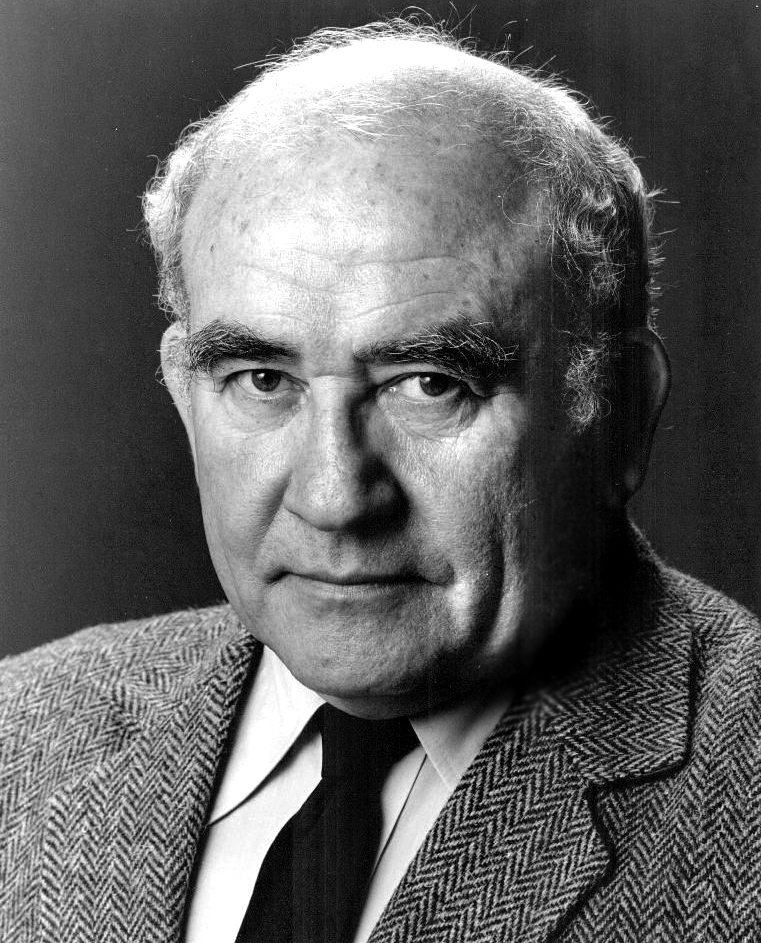
Ed Asner won a Golden Globe award for his performance in The Mary Tyler Moore Show in 1972 and 1976.

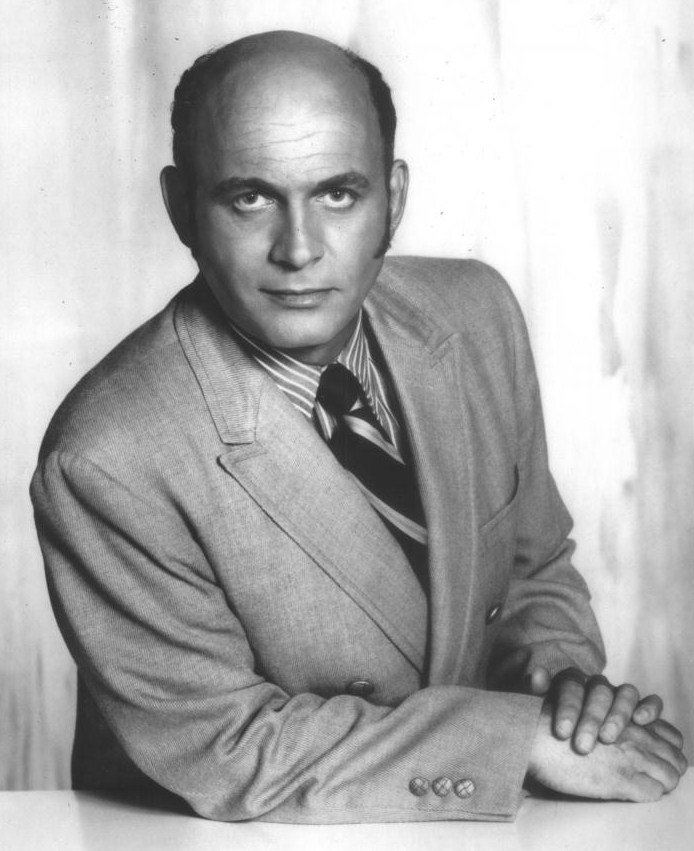
Gavin MacLeod was nominated for a Golden Globe award in 1975 and 1977 for his performance as Murray Slaughter.

Presented since 1949, the Golden Globe Award is an annual accolade awarded by the Hollywood Foreign Press Association for outstanding achievements in film and television. Mary Tyler Moore received 22 nominations during its tenure, winning three awards for Best Actress in a Television Series – Musical or Comedy, awarded to Mary Tyler Moore in 1971, and the award for Best Supporting Actor – Television to Ed Asner in 1972 and 1976.

Year	Category	Nominee(s)	Result	Ref
1970	Best Actress in a Television Series – Musical or Comedy	Mary Tyler Moore as Mary Richards	Won	
1971	Best Television Series – Musical or Comedy		Nominated	
1971	Best Actress in a Television Series – Musical or Comedy	Mary Tyler Moore as Mary Richards	Nominated	
1971	Best Supporting Actor – Television	Ed Asner as Lou Grant	Won	
1972	Best Television Series – Musical or Comedy		Nominated	
1972	Best Actress in a Television Series – Musical or Comedy	Mary Tyler Moore as Mary Richards	Nominated	
1972	Best Supporting Actor – Television	Ed Asner as Lou Grant	Nominated	
1972	Best Supporting Actor – Television	Ted Knight as Ted Baxter	Nominated	
1972	Best Supporting Actress – Television	Valerie Harper as Rhoda Morgenstern	Nominated	
1973	Best Television Series – Musical or Comedy		Nominated	
1973	Best Actress in a Television Series – Musical or Comedy	Mary Tyler Moore as Mary Richards	Nominated	
1973	Best Supporting Actor – Television	Ed Asner as Lou Grant	Nominated	
1973	Best Supporting Actress – Television	Valerie Harper as Rhoda Morgenstern	Nominated	
1974	Best Television Series – Musical or Comedy		Nominated	
1974	Best Actress in a Television Series – Musical or Comedy	Mary Tyler Moore as Mary Richards	Nominated	
1974	Best Actor in a Television Series – Musical or Comedy	Ed Asner as Lou Grant	Nominated	
1974	Best Supporting Actor – Television	Gavin McLeod as Murray Slaughter	Nominated	
1975	Best Actress in a Television Series – Musical or Comedy	Mary Tyler Moore as Mary Richards	Nominated	
1975	Best Supporting Actor – Television	Ed Asner as Lou Grant	Won	
1975	Best Supporting Actor – Television	Ted Knight as Ted Baxter	Nominated	
1976	Best Actress in a Television Series – Musical or Comedy	Mary Tyler Moore as Mary Richards	Nominated	
1976	Best Supporting Actor – Television	Gavin McLeod as Murray Slaughter	Nominated	

=== TV Land Awards ===
The TV Land Award is an award presented at the eponymous award ceremony, airing on TV Land, that honors television programs that are off air. Receiving 13 nominations since the first award ceremony, The Mary Tyler Moore Show won five awards, including Groundbreaking Show and Broadcaster of the Year, the latter posthumously awarded to Ted Knight three times.

Year	Category	Nominee(s)	Episode(s)	Result	Ref
2003	Nosiest Neighbor	Cloris Leachman		Nominated	
2003	Most Memorable Female Guest Star in a Comedy as herself	Betty Ford		Nominated	
2003	Most Memorable Male Guest Star in a Comedy as himself	Walter Cronkite		Nominated	
2003	Funniest Food Fight	Sue Ann Nivens (Betty White)	for "Flying Chocolate Soufflé"	Nominated	
2003	Hippest Fashion Plate - Female	Mary Tyler Moore		Nominated	
2004	Groundbreaking Show	Mary Tyler Moore, John Amos, Ed Asner, Valerie Harper, Cloris Leachman, Gavin MacLeod, Betty White		Won	
2005	Best Dream Sequence		for "Mary's Three Husbands"	Nominated	
2005	Classic TV Broadcaster of the Year	Ted Knight		Won	
2006	Broadcaster of the Year	Ted Knight		Won	
2006	Favorite Series Finale			Nominated	
2007	The "Hey! It's...!" Award (Favorite Cameo or Guest Star)	Walter Cronkite		Nominated	
2008	Broadcaster of the Year	Ted Knight		Won	
2008	Iconic Decoration You Want for Your House	Mary Richards' big "M"		Won	

=== Writers Guild of America Awards ===
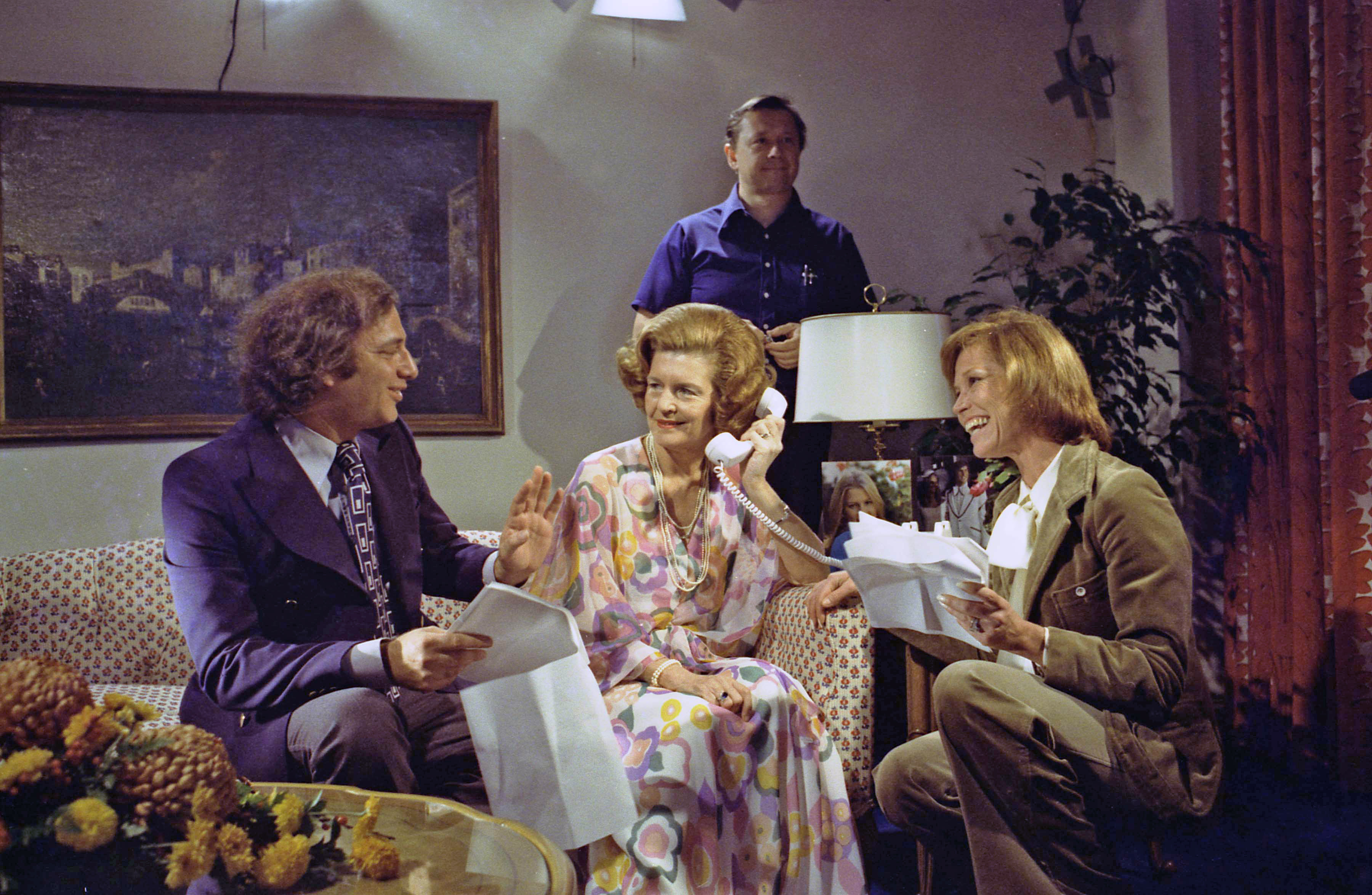
Ed. Weinberger (pictured left) had 3 episodes he wrote nominated for the WGA Award for Television: Episodic Comedy.

Presented by the Writers Guild of America (WGA), the Writers Guild of America Award is an annual accolade that recognizes outstanding achievement of writers in film, television, radio, promotional writing and videogames. The Mary Tyler Moore Show received 10 nominations of for the award for Television: Episodic Comedy, winning once in 1971.

Year	Category	Nominee(s)	Episode(s)	Result	Ref
1971	Television: Episodic Comedy	Martin Cohan	for "Thoroughly Unmilitant Mary"	Won	
1972	Television: Episodic Comedy	Allan Burns and James L. Brooks	for "The Good-Time News"	Nominated	
1973	Television: Episodic Comedy	Ed. Weinberger	for "The Lars Affair"	Nominated	
1974	Television: Episodic Comedy	Ed. Weinberger and Stan Daniels	for "Will Mary Richards Go to Jail?"	Nominated	
1975	Television: Episodic Comedy	Bob Ellison	for "Edie Gets Married"	Nominated	
1975	Television: Episodic Comedy	David Lloyd	for "Chuckles Bites the Dust"	Nominated	
1976	Television: Episodic Comedy	Bob Ellison	for "My Son, the Genius"	Nominated	
1976	Television: Episodic Comedy	David Lloyd	for "Mary's Insomnia"	Nominated	
1977	Television: Episodic Comedy	James L. Brooks, Allan Burns, Ed. Weinberger, Stan Daniels, David Lloyd, Bob Ellison	for "The Last Show"	Nominated	
1977	Television: Episodic Comedy	David Lloyd	for "The Critic"	Nominated	

=== Other awards ===
Award	Year	Category	Nominee	Result	Ref
Humanitas Prize	1977	30 Minute Network or Syndicated Television	Earl Pomerantz for "Ted's Change of Heart"	Won	
Online Film & Television Association Awards	1997	OFTA TV Hall of Fame		Won	
Peabody Award	1977	MTM Enterprises		Won	
Television Critics Association Awards	2007	Heritage Award		Nominated	
Television Critics Association Awards	2016	Heritage Award		Won	
