= Chris Hayward =

American screenwriter

- Born: Christopher Robert Hayward; June 19, 1925; Bayonne, New Jersey, U.S.
- Died: November 20, 2006 (aged 81); Beverly Hills, California, U.S.
- Occupation(s): Television writer and producer
- Known for: Co-creator, with Allan Burns, of the 1960s television shows The Munsters and My Mother the Car, and the creator of Dudley Do-Right
- Spouses: Geraldine P. Kulcher (m. 1954; div. 1966); Linda K. Simmons (m. 1969)
- Children: 3

Christopher Robert Hayward (June 19, 1925 – November 20, 2006) was an American television writer and producer. He was the co-creator, with Allan Burns, of the television shows The Munsters (1964) and My Mother the Car (1965), and the creator of Dudley Do-Right.

== Biography ==
Born in Bayonne, New Jersey, Hayward was a writer for the 1957-1958 color edition of Crusader Rabbit (as "Chris Bob Hayward"), The Rocky and Bullwinkle Show, Alice, Barney Miller, Get Smart, 77 Sunset Strip, Fractured Flickers, and The Governor & J.J.

He won, with Allan Burns, the 1968 Emmy Award for "Outstanding Writing Achievement in Comedy" for the episode "The Coming Out Party" of the television show He & She.

Hayward died of cancer on November 20, 2006, in his Beverly Hills home.
