= He & She =

American television series

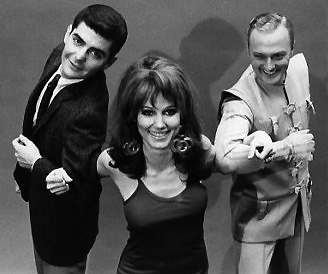
- Benjamin, Prentiss, and Cassidy, 1967
- Genre: Sitcom
- Created by: Leonard Stern
- Starring: Paula Prentiss; Richard Benjamin; Jack Cassidy; Hamilton Camp; Kenneth Mars
- Theme music composer: Jerry Fielding
- Country of origin: United States
- Original language: English
- No. of seasons: 1
- No. of episodes: 26

Production
- Executive producer: Leonard Stern
- Producers: Arne Sultan; Arnie Rosen
- Production company: Talent Associates in association with CBS Productions

Original release
- Network: CBS
- Release: September 6, 1967 – March 13, 1968

He & She is an American sitcom aired on CBS as part of its 1967–68 lineup.

He & She is widely considered by broadcast historians to have been ahead of its time. Its sophisticated approach to comedy was viewed as opening doors to the groundbreaking MTM family of sitcoms of the 1970s, beginning with The Mary Tyler Moore Show in 1970. The character of Oscar was openly the pattern for the Ted Baxter character, for which creator Leonard Stern granted permission. The series marked Paula Prentiss' comeback after having a breakdown during What's New Pussycat?.

== Plot ==
Scene from the show's first episode

He & She stars real-life married couple Richard Benjamin and Paula Prentiss as Dick and Paula Hollister, a successful cartoonist and his wife, a social worker. Hollister's cartoon Jetman had been so successful that it was now a network television series starring egomaniacal actor Oscar North (Jack Cassidy), as the titular Jetman. North constantly argues with Hollister over the interpretation and direction of the Jetman character. Folksinger-actor Hamilton Camp played the role of handyman Andrew Hummel at the apartment building where the starring characters lived, and Kenneth Mars played firefighter Harry Zarakartos, who would often drop in on the Hollisters' apartment via a plank connected to the firehouse across the alley.

Writers Chris Hayward and Allan Burns, who created the series The Munsters, were hired by executive producer Leonard Stern (co-writer and producer of Get Smart) as story editors for He & She, for which they won the 1968 Emmy Award for comedy writing. The show received four other Emmy nominations that year, including nominations for Prentiss, Benjamin, and Cassidy. However it was not nominated for Outstanding Comedy Series.

Burns would go on to be a writer and co-creator (among others) of The Mary Tyler Moore Show, of which He & She is considered a major forerunner. The show also earned three of the four Writers Guild nominations for Best Writing in a Comedy.

Despite the strong lead-in provided by Green Acres (a top-25 primetime show that season), He & She was canceled after one season, although selected episodes were later rerun as a summer replacement series by CBS in 1970 following the cancellation of The Tim Conway Show. Reruns later aired on the USA Network in 1985-86 and TV Land ran selected episodes of the series in 1998, but it has not been seen since then. Cast members, such as Richard Benjamin, felt that the Green Acres lead-in actually hurt the show because the two series were so different in their approaches, rural and urban, respectively. The series was also a pioneer in the portrayal of the working wife, which was not yet in vogue on television.

According to the show's creator Leonard Stern, Michael Dann, president of CBS at the time, called He & She "the best show I ever canceled". Stern believed that the time slot, after Green Acres, hurt the show's possibility for success, despite favorable reviews, because the two were incompatible. Stern believed that Cassidy, as the "first suggested gay" in a TV series, "did unnerve the network somewhat" by stepping "beyond the boundaries of what they considered to be good taste."

== Episodes ==
No.	Title	Directed by	Written by	Original release date
1	"The Old Man and the She"	Leonard Stern	Leonard Stern & Arne Sultan	September 6, 1967
Paula enlists the help of Dick in aiding the cause of an elderly Greek gentleman who faces deportation.
2	"The Second Time Around"	Leonard Stern	Jim Parker & Arnold Margolin	September 13, 1967
On their 6th anniversary, Dick and Paula plan a big second wedding, but confusion ensues with the presence of two best men.
3	"How to Fail in Business"	Leonard Stern	Martin A. Ragaway	September 20, 1967
Dick and Paula decide to purchase their apartment building, but are soon inundated with complaints from their neighbors.
4	"The Phantom of 84th Street"	Jay Sandrich	Arnold Margolin & Jim Parker	September 27, 1967
Oscar's $65,000 painting is stolen from Dick and Paula's apartment, while a friend inexplicably gives Paula a herd of goats.
5	"One of Our Firemen is Missing"	Jay Sandrich	Austin Kalish & Irma Kalish	October 4, 1967
Instead of working at the firehouse, Harry decides to help Dick and Paula, but is then dismissed from his job as a result.
6	"Before You Bury Me Can I Say Something?"	Jay Sandrich	Jim Parker & Arnold Margolin	October 11, 1967
After undergoing his routine physical, Dick mentions to Paula that he is having his will drawn up, leading to frenzied explanations that he is in good health.
7	"Dick's Van Dyke"	Jay Sandrich	Allan Burns & Chris Hayward	October 18, 1967
As part of a bet stemming from a 10-day vacation, Richard and his friends sport beards upon their return and try to see who can keep their facial hair the longest.
8	"The Background Man"	Jay Sandrich	Allan Burns & Chris Hayward	October 25, 1967
Dick hires an attractive, but klutzy woman to help him draw his comic strip and Paula develops pangs of jealousy over the new business arrangement.
9	"Vote Yes or No"	Jay Sandrich	Chris Hayward & Allan Burns	November 1, 1967
Dick and Paula are at odds when he and his boss campaign against an increase in pay for firemen, causing Paula to picket his offices.
10	"He and She vs. Him"	Jay Sandrich	Chris Hayward & Allan Burns	November 8, 1967
Suffering from writer's block, Dick is subsequently sued for plagiarism by a comic book rival, who also happens to be a former boyfriend of Paula's.
11	"The Coming-Out Party"	Jay Sandrich	Chris Hayward & Allan Burns	November 15, 1967
Paula's friend Dorothy begins dating Dick's dentist, Dr. Krillman, but the two end their relationship the night before Dick's tonsillectomy. Guest stars John Astin and Mariette Hartley. Note: In 1968, this episode won the Emmy Award for Outstanding Writing Comedy Series.
12	"Deep in the Heart of Taxes"	Jay Sandrich	Joe Bondaduce	November 22, 1967
Dick and Paula are audited by the IRS, with Dick unaware that Paula has kept him in the dark about her undeclared horse racing winnings.
13	"Don't Call Us"	Jay Sandrich	Chris Hayward & Allan Burns	November 29, 1967
After Dick and Paula get an unlisted phone number, Paula forgets it, which makes them unreachable in an emergency and prevents their attendance at a party for Princess Grace.
14	"North Goes West"	Jay Sandrich	Chris Hayward & Allan Burns	December 13, 1967
After Oscar decides to move to California for the Jetman TV show, Dick and Paula make plans to move until Oscar throws a going-away party for himself.
15	"Easy Way Out"	Jay Sandrich	Arnold Margolin	December 20, 1967
Paula's poker party is unexpectedly raided by the police, resulting in Oscar running away to protect his reputation.
16	"Poster Boy"	Jay Sandrich	Jim Parker & Arnold Margolin	December 27, 1967
When a wanted poster of a neighborhood burglar closely resembles the apartment handyman Andrew, he becomes the chief suspect in Oscar's eyes.
17	"45 Midgets From Broadway"	Jay Sandrich	Arnold Margolin & Jim Parker	January 3, 1968
When Jetman is made into a Broadway musical, Oscar is cast in the lead, but is a disaster, resulting in Dick, Paula and the show's backers brainstorming to fix the show.
18	"A Rock by Any Other Name"	Jay Sandrich	S : Treva Silverman & Peter Meyerson; T : Milt Rosen & Arne Sultan	January 10, 1968
After Harry loses a rock that Paula gave Dick to commemorate their Adirondacks first date. Dick has a copy made but it is just not the same.
19	"Goodman, Spare That Tree"	Jay Sandrich	Allan Burns & Chris Hayward	January 24, 1968
Paula's cousin from Texas arrives with an olive tree that she insists will make a fortune, but authorities have other plans.
20	"The White Collar Worker"	Jay Sandrich	Jim Parker & Arnold Margolin	January 31, 1968
After a penniless, uninsured minister hits Dick and Paula's new car, he offers to do handiwork for the couple, which leads to disaster.
21	"Along Came Kim"	Jay Sandrich	Arne Sultan & Milt Rosen	February 7, 1968
Dick and Paula's Korean foster son comes for a visit, but he confuses Harry for his foster father, leading to havoc.
22	"What Do You Get for the Man Who Has Nothing?"	Jay Sandrich	Chris Hayward & Allan Burns	February 14, 1968
Oscar entertains Harry for three days so that Dick and Paula can redecorate Oscar's apartment for a surprise birthday party.
23	"Dog's Best Friend"	Jay Sandrich	Milt Rosen	February 21, 1968
Dick and Paula agree to watch a couple's dog after the latter's marriage breaks up, but the dog proceeds to drive Dick crazy.
24	"It's Not Whether You Win or Lose, It's How You Watch the Game"	Jay Sandrich	Peggy Elliott & Ed Scharlach	February 28, 1968
After a misunderstanding, Dick and Paula forfeit 30 tickets that were reserved for the Northwestern-Michigan State game, causing them to scramble for replacements.
25	"Knock, Knock, Who's There? Fernando, Fernando Who?"	Jay Sandrich	Allan Burns & Chris Hayward	March 6, 1968
While Dick is out of town, Harry jumps to conclusions when he sees Fernando Lamas massaging Paula's leg.
26	"What's in the Kitty?"	Jay Sandrich	S : Paul Mason; T : Milt Rosen & Arne Sultan & Leonard Stern	March 13, 1968
Dick and Paula host his boss for a dinner party, but the trio endures a sick cat, a poison scare and a mouse.
