= Rhoda Morgenstern =

Fictional character from The Mary Tyler Moore Show

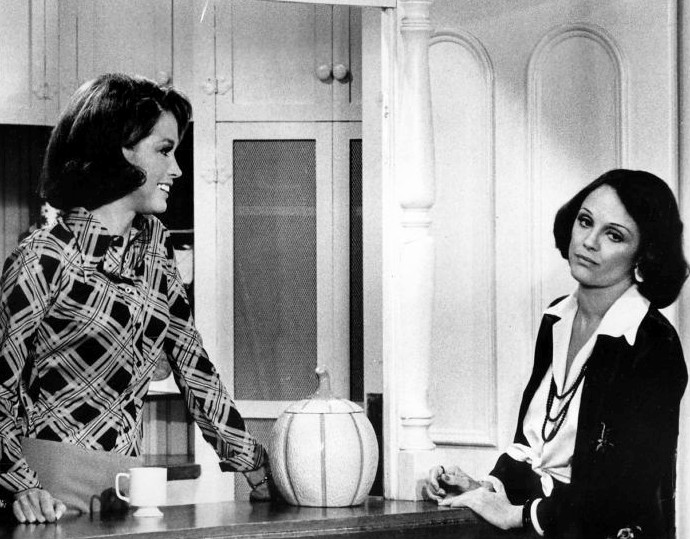
- Mary and Rhoda.
- First appearance: "Love Is All Around" (1970)
- Last appearance: Mary and Rhoda (2000)
- Created by: James L. Brooks and Allan Burns
- Portrayed by: Valerie Harper

In-universe information
- Gender: Female
- Occupation: Photographer; Former costume designer Former window dresser
- Family: Martin Morgenstern (father); Ida Morgenstern (mother); Debbie Morgenstern (sister); Brenda Morgernstern (sister); Arnold Morgenstern (brother); Max (uncle); Leonard (uncle); Rose (aunt); Edith (cousin); Grandmother Morgenstern (paternal grandmother)
- Spouses: Joe Gerard (divorced); Jean-Pierre Rousseau (divorced)
- Children: Meredith Rousseau (daughter); Donny Gerard (stepson)

Rhoda Faye Morgenstern, portrayed by Valerie Harper, is a fictional character on the television sitcom The Mary Tyler Moore Show. The character was spun off to the show Rhoda, in which she was the protagonist.

== Character background ==
The original opening of the series Rhoda establishes that Rhoda Faye Morgenstern was born in the Bronx, New York, in December 1941. Her family is Jewish. She is the daughter of Ida and Martin Morgenstern (Nancy Walker and Harold Gould), and grew up in New York before moving to Minneapolis, Minnesota, sometime in the late 1960s. On The Mary Tyler Moore Show, Rhoda had a sister named Debbie (Liberty Williams), seen in one episode, and a briefly-mentioned brother named Arnold; these two were retconned out of the back story when the character got her own series. On Rhoda, Rhoda's only sibling was a younger sister named Brenda, although in the sixth episode, Brenda refers to herself as Rhoda's "youngest sister."

== The Mary Tyler Moore Show ==
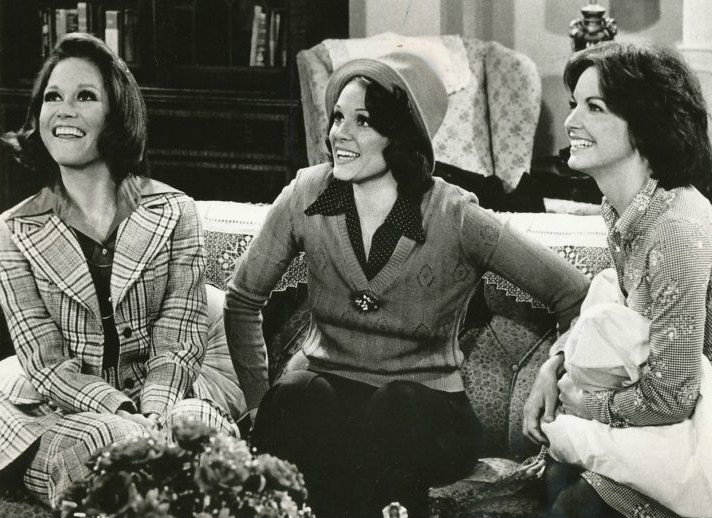
Mary and Rhoda with Debbie Morgenstern.

Relocating from New York City, Rhoda was a window dresser at Hempel's after being fired from Bloomfield's department store in Minneapolis. (She also became the proprietor of a plant boutique in one third-season episode, though this was not referenced again). She rented an attic loft apartment in the same house as the building manager, Phyllis Lindstrom.

In the debut episode, Mary Richards moved into the larger apartment, one floor below, which Rhoda had been trying to secure for herself. This caused the two to initially clash, but in spite of themselves and their differences (Mary was a polite, sophisticated mid-westerner, Rhoda was an astringent, brash New Yorker) they quickly became best friends.

Throughout the series, Rhoda and Phyllis maintained an adversarial but friendly relationship. Rhoda also developed a close bond with Phyllis's daughter, Bess, who referred to Rhoda as her "aunt." While living in Minneapolis, Rhoda received occasional visits from her parents.

== Rhoda ==
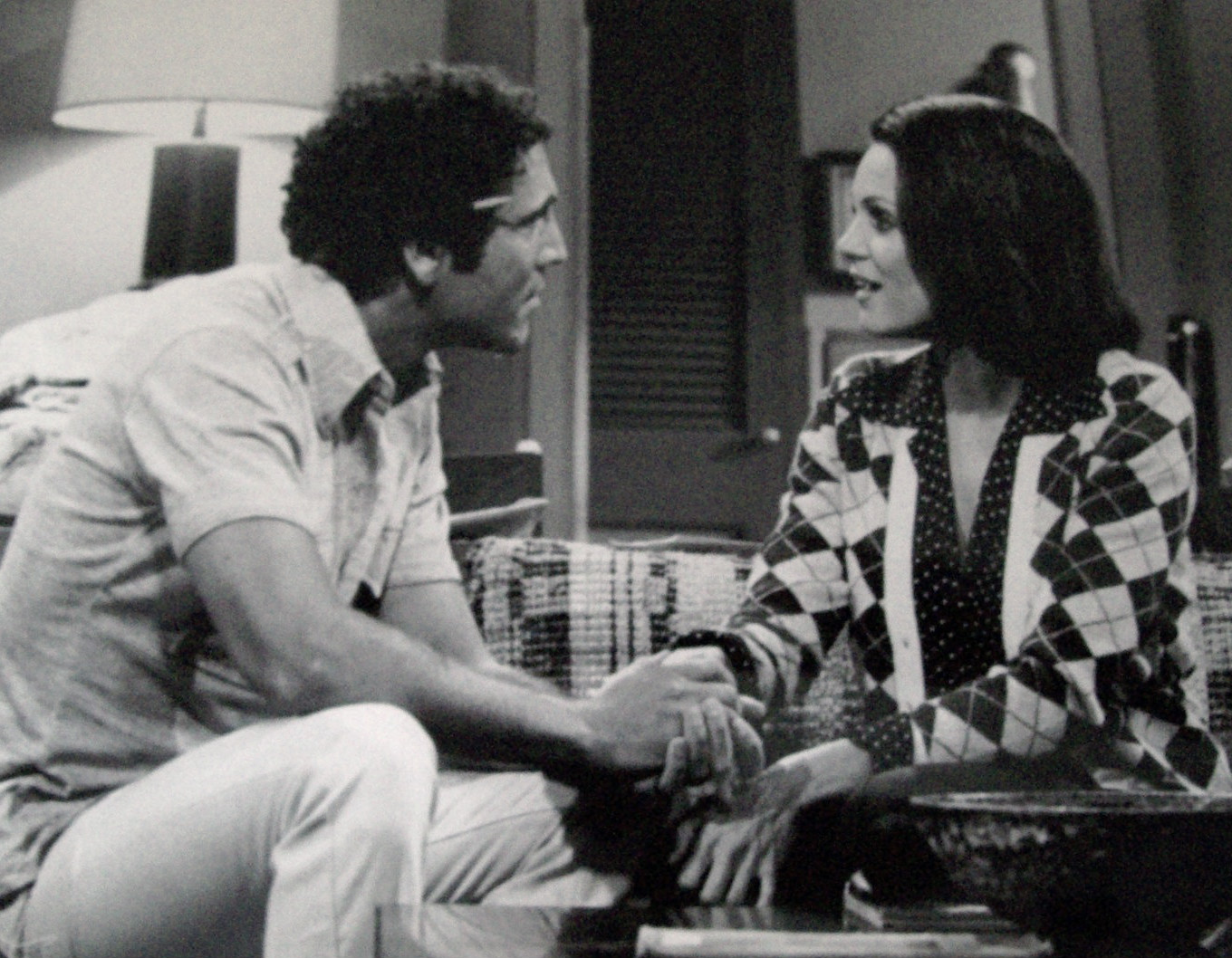
Joe and Rhoda

In 1974, Harper departed from The Mary Tyler Moore Show to star in Rhoda.

In Rhoda, Rhoda Morgenstern moved back to New York City, where she met ruggedly handsome Joe Gerard (David Groh) and married him soon afterward. The couple moved into the same building occupied by Rhoda's sister, Brenda, and for the first two years of the show, Rhoda worked in her own small window dressing company while Joe pursued his career as a building contractor. Brenda, a single, insecure, self-conscious bank teller, often turned to Rhoda for advice (especially about her love life), and Rhoda's parents Ida and Martin were seen frequently.

Rhoda's Wedding Episode

On October 28, 1974, eight weeks into the start of the series, the characters Rhoda and Joe were married in a special hour-long episode of Rhoda. This episode set several television records, becoming the highest-rated television episode of the 1970s until it was surpassed by the miniseries Roots in 1977. At the time of its airing, it was the second most-watched television episode ever, following the birth of Little Ricky on I Love Lucy in 1953.

The episode attracted over 52 million viewers, accounting for more than half of the U.S. television audience. During the broadcast, Monday Night Football host Howard Cosell humorously remarked that he had not been invited to the wedding before returning viewers to the game. Fans across the United States held “wedding parties” to celebrate the event, and CBS-TV studios received numerous wedding gifts for the fictional couple. Critics lauded the episode, describing it as a “television phenomenon” and “unlike anything that had happened on television for nearly twenty years.” The episode earned Valerie Harper her fourth Emmy award in 1975. Vogue magazine noted that people went to great lengths to watch the episode, including checking into motels and canceling dinner plans.

Rhoda's marriage soured after two years, and Rhoda and Joe eventually divorced. Later episodes featured Rhoda tentatively re-entering the dating scene. She also wound down her struggling window dressing company and took a job at a costume company.

== Mary and Rhoda ==
Rhoda gave up her career as a window dresser/costume designer and pursued a career as a photographer in the time between the 1978 cancellation of Rhoda and the 2000 made-for-television movie Mary and Rhoda. By this time she had also married and divorced Jean-Pierre Rousseau, a union which produced her only child, a daughter named Meredith. Mary and Rhoda had lost track of one another after an argument over Rhoda's second husband, whom Mary disliked, but they reconnected and reestablished their friendship in the 2000 movie.

== Reception ==
Harper won four Primetime Emmy Awards for her portrayal of Rhoda, with three of these awards for The Mary Tyler Moore Show and one for Rhoda. In 2006, Entertainment Weekly ranked Rhoda Morgenstern 23rd on its list of the best sidekicks ever. Bravo ranked Rhoda 57th on their list of the 100 greatest TV characters. In 2000, Time magazine stated that Rhoda's relationship with Mary Richards was "one of the most renowned friendships in TV."
