= Jack De Mave =

American stage television actor (1933–2025)

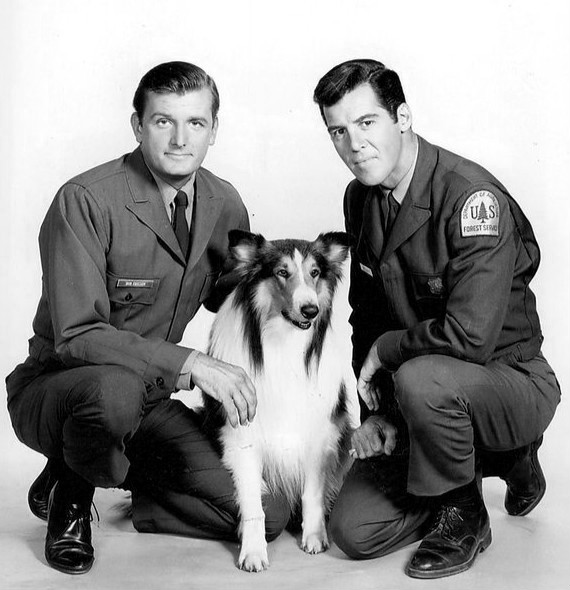
- De Mave (left) with Lassie and Jed Allan in Lassie, 1969
- Born: John Francois De Mave; December 8, 1933; Jersey City, New Jersey, U.S.
- Died: January 16, 2025 (aged 91); Macon, Georgia, U.S.
- Occupation(s): Stage and television actor
- Years active: 1958–2008
- Spouse: Ann Camille Smith (m. 1963; died 2013)

John Francois De Mave (December 8, 1933 – January 16, 2025) was an American stage and television actor. He was perhaps best known for playing Forest Ranger Bob Erickson in the American children's adventure television series Lassie from 1968 to 1970.

== Life and career ==
De Mave was born in Jersey City, New Jersey, on December 8, 1933, the son of a professional boxer. He began his career in 1958, appearing in the play The Visit. He then made his television debut in 1962, appearing in the drama television series Surfside 6. He guest-starred in television programs including F Troop, Marcus Welby, M.D., The Fugitive, The Mary Tyler Moore Show, Daniel Boone, Adam-12 and Wagon Train, and The Doris Day Show. In 1968, he joined the cast of CBS's television series Lassie, playing the role of Forest Ranger Bob Erickson until 1970.

De Mave played the role of Dr. Gregory Eldridge in the soap opera television series Days of Our Lives and the role of Cal Clinton in The Bold and the Beautiful. He retired in 2008, last appearing in the television film Ladies of the House.

== Personal life ==
In 1963, De Mave married Ann Camille Smith. She died in 2013, at the age of 84.

De Mave died in hospice care following a heart attack in Macon, Georgia, on January 16, 2025, at the age of 91.

== Bibliography ==
- Collins, Ace (1993). Lassie: A Dog's Life. New York: Penguin Books. ISBN 978-0-1402-3183-0.
