= Richard Schaal =

American actor (1928–2014)

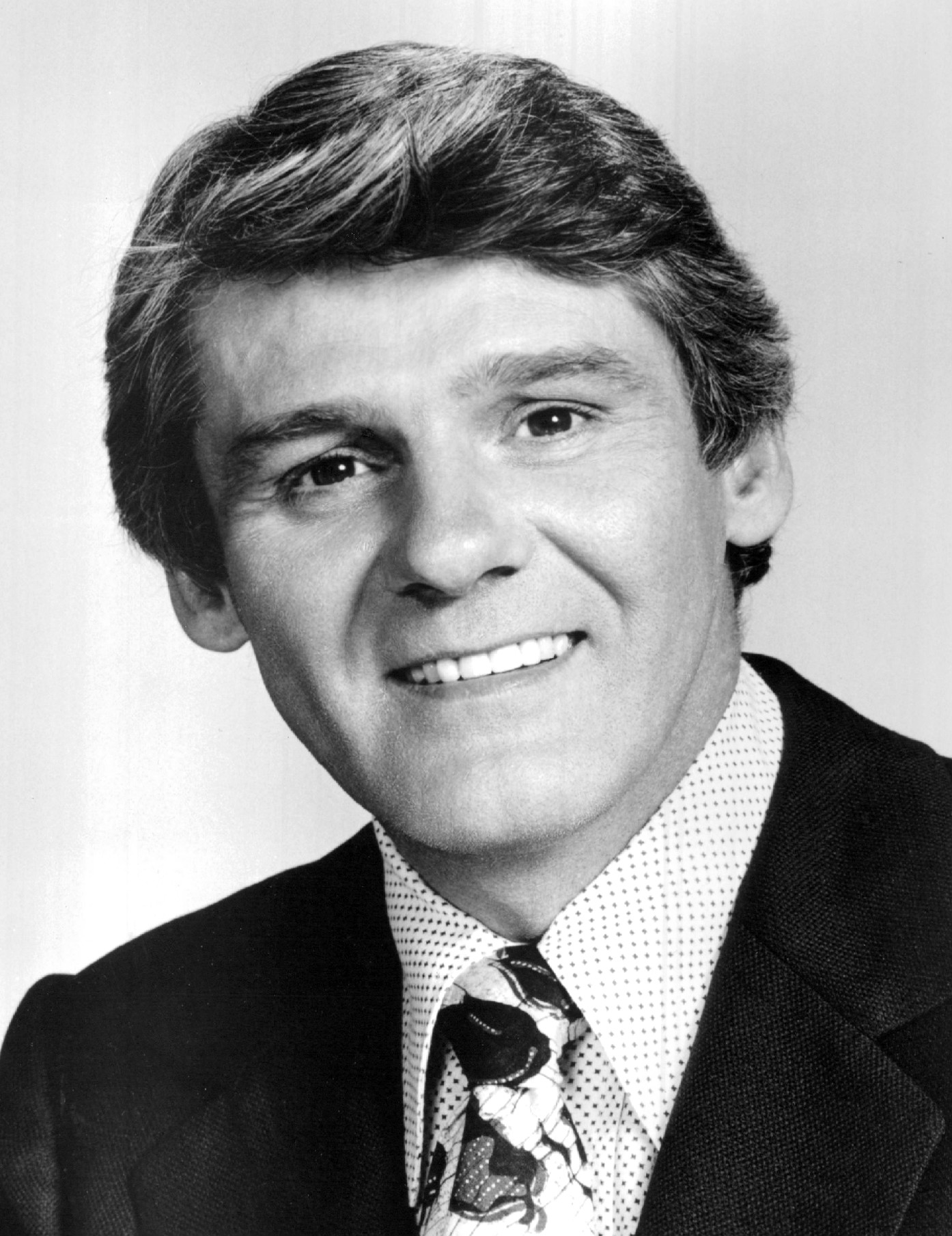
- Schaal in 1975
- Born: May 5, 1928; Chicago, Illinois, US
- Died: November 4, 2014 (aged 86); Los Angeles, California, US
- Burial place: Forest Lawn Memorial Park, Hollywood Hills
- Occupation: Actor
- Years active: 1962–1990
- Spouses: Lois Treacy (m. 19??; div. 19??); Valerie Harper (m. 1964; div. 1978) Tasha Brittain (m. 1980; div. 1989)
- Children: Wendy Schaal

Richard Schaal (/ˈʃɑːl/; May 5, 1928 – November 4, 2014) was an American film and television actor born in Chicago, Illinois.

== Career ==
In 1962, Schaal joined Chicago's famed Second City, becoming skilled in sketch and improvisational comedy. Schaal and Valerie Harper wrote "Love and the Visitor" (1970) for Love, American Style, a TV series. He was featured in a number of episodes of the 1970s sitcoms The Mary Tyler Moore Show (where he played no fewer than four different characters: Howard Arnell, his brother Paul, Chuckles the Clown and Dino), The Bob Newhart Show (as three characters: Don Fezler, Don Livingston and Chuck Brock), Rhoda (as Charlie Burke) and Phyllis (23 episodes as Leo Heatherton). His earliest appearance with Mary Tyler Moore was in the 1966 Dick Van Dyke Show episode "Dear Sally Rogers" (billed as Dick Schaal). In both The Mary Tyler Moore Show and Rhoda, he played alongside his then-wife, Valerie Harper. In 1983, he had a recurring role in Just Our Luck.

== Personal life and death ==
Schaal was born on May 5, 1928, in Chicago, the son of Victor Cornelius Schaal, a machinist, and Margaret Semple Waddell, a telephone operator.

Schaal was married three times, first to Lois Treacy, second to actress Valerie Harper, and third to Tasha Brittain. With Treacy, he had one child, American actress Wendy Schaal.

Schaal died November 4, 2014, in the Woodland Hills neighborhood of Los Angeles, California, at age 86. No cause of death was provided. He was buried in Forest Lawn Memorial Park in Los Angeles.

== Partial filmography ==
=== Films ===
Year	Title	Role
1966	The Russians Are Coming, the Russians Are Coming	Oscar Maxwell
1969	The Virgin President	Hugh Mugababy
1969	The Cube	The Man in the Cube
1972	Slaughterhouse-Five	Howard W. Campbell Jr.
1973	Steelyard Blues	Zoo Official Mel
1974	A Knife for the Ladies	Ainslie
1979	Americathon	Jerry
1980	The Hollywood Knights	Nevans
1982	O'Hara's Wife	Jerry Brad
1985	Once Bitten	Mr. Kendall

=== Television ===
Year	Title	Role	Notes
1966	The Dick Van Dyke Show	Stevie Parsons	Episode: "Dear Sally Rogers" (as Dick Schall)
1967	That Girl	Lost & Found Man	Episode: "Gone with the Breeze" (as Dick Schall)
1969	I Dream of Jeannie	Marvin Oglethorpe	Episode: "Jeannie and the Secret Weapon" (as Dick Schaal)
1970	The Mary Tyler Moore Show	various, including Chuckles the Clown	4 episodes
1973	The Partridge Family	Michaelangelo Rezo	Episode: "Me and My Shadow"
1974	The Rockford Files	Leonard Blair	Ep: "Caledonia, It's Worth a Fortune!"
1975–1976	Phyllis	Leo Heatherton	Main cast (season 1)
1976	Rhoda	Charlie Burke	Ep: "Man of the House"
1978	Please Stand By	Frank Lampert	Main Cast, Elinore Donahue was cast as wife (replaced midseason)
1983	Just Our Luck	Chuck	Main cast
1988–1989	Almost Grown	Dick Long	Main cast
