= Treva Silverman =

American screenwriter (born 1936)

- Born: May 20, 1936 (age 90)
- Occupation: TV writer
- Years active: 1964–1994
- Known for: The Mary Tyler Moore Show

Treva Silverman (born May 20, 1936) is an American screenwriter, best known for her work on the 1970s sitcom The Mary Tyler Moore Show.

== Early life and career ==
Raised in Cedarhurst, Long Island, Silverman was the youngest of four daughters born to Mr. and Mrs. Nathan Silverman. She attended Bennington College, earning a Bachelor of Arts in 1959.

In the 1960s and 1970s, Silverman also wrote scripts for That Girl, The Monkees, He & She, The Mary Tyler Moore Show, Room 222 and The Bill Cosby Show.

In an excerpt from an interview conducted by WGAW, published in March 1997, Silverman cites as seminal influences the "world of fast, witty dialogue" epitomized by the 1930s Hollywood romantic comedy as well as the work of two writers in particular, namely Robert Benchley and Dorothy Parker—the former "for his benign, hilarious observations of behavior," and the latter "for her insight into relationships."

== Awards ==
- 1974: Emmy Awards, Outstanding Writing for a Comedy Series for The Mary Tyler Moore, "The Lou and Edie Story"
- 1974: Emmy Awards, Writer of the Year - Series for The Mary Tyler Moore, "The Lou and Edie Story"

== Filmography ==
- 1964: The Entertainers (TV series) – writer
- 1967: NBC Experiment in Television (TV series) – writer (episode: "We Interrupt This Season")
- 1967: That Girl (TV series) – writer
- 1967: Captain Nice (TV series) – writer
- 1966-1967: The Monkees (TV series) – writer
- 1967: Accidental Family (TV series) – writer (episode: "A Funny Thing Happened on the Way to the Playground")
- 1968: He & She (TV series) – writer (episode: "A Rock by Any Other Name")
- 1968: The Dean Martin Show (TV series) – writer
- 1969: Room 222 (TV series) – writer
- 1970: Lancelot Link, Secret Chimp (TV series) – writer
- 1970: The Many Moods of Perry Como (TV series) – writer
- 1971: The Bill Cosby Show (TV series) – writer
- 1972: Oh, Nurse (TV movie) – writer
- 1970-1974: The Mary Tyler Moore Show (TV series) – writer, executive story consultant
- 1977: Vanities (TV movie) – writer
- 1984: Romancing the Stone – uncredited script polish
- 1990: The Fanelli Boys (TV series) – producer, writer
- 1994: De Sylvia Millecam Show (TV series) – writer
