= Bob Ellison =

American consultant, screenwriter and producer (1933–2024)

Robert James Ellison (February 25, 1933 – April 8, 2024) was an American consultant, screenwriter and television producer. He worked on television programs including Dear John, The Mary Tyler Moore Show and Wings.

== Life and career ==
Ellison was born in New York City on February 25, 1933. He won two Primetime Emmy Awards and five nominations for Outstanding Writing Variety or Music from 1971 to 1977. He died at the Cedars-Sinai Medical Center in Los Angeles on April 8, 2024, at the age of 91.

== Filmography ==
- Andy Richter Controls the Universe (TV series) 2002-2003
- It's All Relative (TV series) (creative consultant - 10 episodes) 2003-2004
- Becker (creative consultant - 61 episodes) 1999-2003
- In-Laws (TV series) (creative consultant) 2002
- The Trouble with Normal (TV series) (creative consultant - 4 episodes) 2000-2001
- Caroline in the City (TV series) (executive consultant - 90 episodes, 1995-2000)
- Wings (TV series) (creative consultant - 89 episodes) 1993-1997
- Fired Up (creative consultant) 1997
- Pearl (TV series) (creative consultant - 2 episodes) 1996
- Cheers (TV series) (executive script consultant - 166 episodes)1986-1993
- Amen (TV series) (creative consultant - 6 episodes, 1986-1987)
- Angie (TV series) (executive consultant - 3 episodes) 1997
- Mary Tyler Moore (TV series) (executive story editor - 41 episodes, 1975-1977)
