= Allan Burns =

American screenwriter and television producer (1935–2021)

- Born: Allan Pennington Burns; May 18, 1935; Baltimore, Maryland, U.S.
- Died: January 30, 2021 (aged 85); Los Angeles, California, U.S.
- Occupations: Screenwriter; television producer
- Notable work: The Munsters; The Mary Tyler Moore Show
- Spouse: Joan Bailey (m. 1964)
- Children: 2

Signature
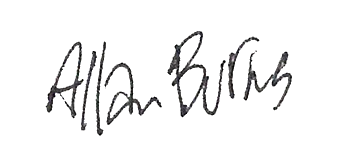

Allan Pennington Burns (May 18, 1935 – January 30, 2021) was an American screenwriter and television producer. He was best known for co-creating and writing for the television sitcoms The Munsters and The Mary Tyler Moore Show.

== Early life ==
Burns was born in Baltimore on May 18, 1935. His father died when he was nine years old. Three years later, he moved to Honolulu with his mother after his older brother was assigned to Naval Station Pearl Harbor. He attended Punahou School and illustrated a cartoon that featured several times a week in the Honolulu Star-Bulletin. He studied architecture at the University of Oregon starting in 1953, after being awarded a partial scholarship. He dropped out two years later and moved to Los Angeles, where he secured a job as a page for NBC.

== Career ==
Before breaking into television and film, he started in animation, working for Jay Ward and collaborating on and animating The Rocky and Bullwinkle Show, Dudley Do-Right, and George of the Jungle. Burns also created the Cap'n Crunch character for Quaker Oats.

After his stint writing for Jay Ward, Burns formed a partnership with Chris Hayward. They created the series The Munsters (1964) and My Mother the Car (1965), and they were hired by producer Leonard Stern as story editors for the series He & She, for which they won an Emmy award for comedy writing. The last project between Hayward and Burns was the sitcom Get Smart. During this time, Burns co-wrote the unaired version of the 1965 pilot episode of The Smothers Brothers Show.

Burns first met James L. Brooks in 1965, getting him a writing job on his show My Mother The Car. After being impressed with the television pilot for Brooks's show Room 222, Burns began a partnership with Brooks and joined the Room 222 writing staff and later produced the series.

After Room 222, television executive Grant Tinker hired Brooks and Burns to develop a television series for CBS starring Mary Tyler Moore. In 1970, The Mary Tyler Moore Show premiered and became a critically acclaimed series, spawning spin-off series such as Lou Grant and Rhoda. Brooks and Burns also created the 1974 situation comedy Paul Sand in Friends and Lovers. Burns also worked as a writer and producer on the shows FM, The Duck Factory, Eisenhower and Lutz, and Cutters.

Burns also worked in film, co-writing the film A Little Romance (1979), for which he was nominated for an Academy Award for Best Adapted Screenplay. He also wrote the screenplays Butch and Sundance: The Early Days, Just the Way You Are and wrote and directed Just Between Friends.

== Personal life ==
Burns married Joan Bailey in 1964; the couple had two children: Eric and Matthew.

Burns died at his home in Los Angeles on January 30, 2021, aged 85, from Parkinson's disease and Lewy body dementia.

== Awards ==
=== Primetime Emmy Awards ===
Year (Note: Indicates the year of the ceremony.)	Category	Work	Result	Ref.
1968	Outstanding Writing for a Comedy Series	He & She, "The Coming-Out Party" (with Chris Hayward)	Won	
1971	Outstanding Writing for a Comedy Series	The Mary Tyler Moore Show, "Support Your Local Mother," (with James L. Brooks)	Won	
1973	Outstanding Writing for a Comedy Series	The Mary Tyler Moore Show, "The Good Time News" (with James L. Brooks)	Nominated	
1975	Outstanding Writing for a Comedy Series	Rhoda, "Rhoda's Wedding" (with Norman Barasch, James L. Brooks, David Davis, David Lloyd, Carroll Moore, and Lorenzo Music)	Nominated	
1977	Outstanding Writing for a Comedy Series	The Mary Tyler Moore Show, "The Last Show" (with James L. Brooks, Stan Daniels, Bob Ellison, David Lloyd, and Ed. Weinberger)	Won	
1980	Outstanding Writing for a Drama Series	Lou Grant, "Brushfire" (with Gene Reynolds)	Nominated	
