= Golden Globe Award for Best Supporting Actor – Series, Miniseries or Television Film =

American acting award

Golden Globe Award for Best Supporting Actor – Series, Miniseries, or Television Film
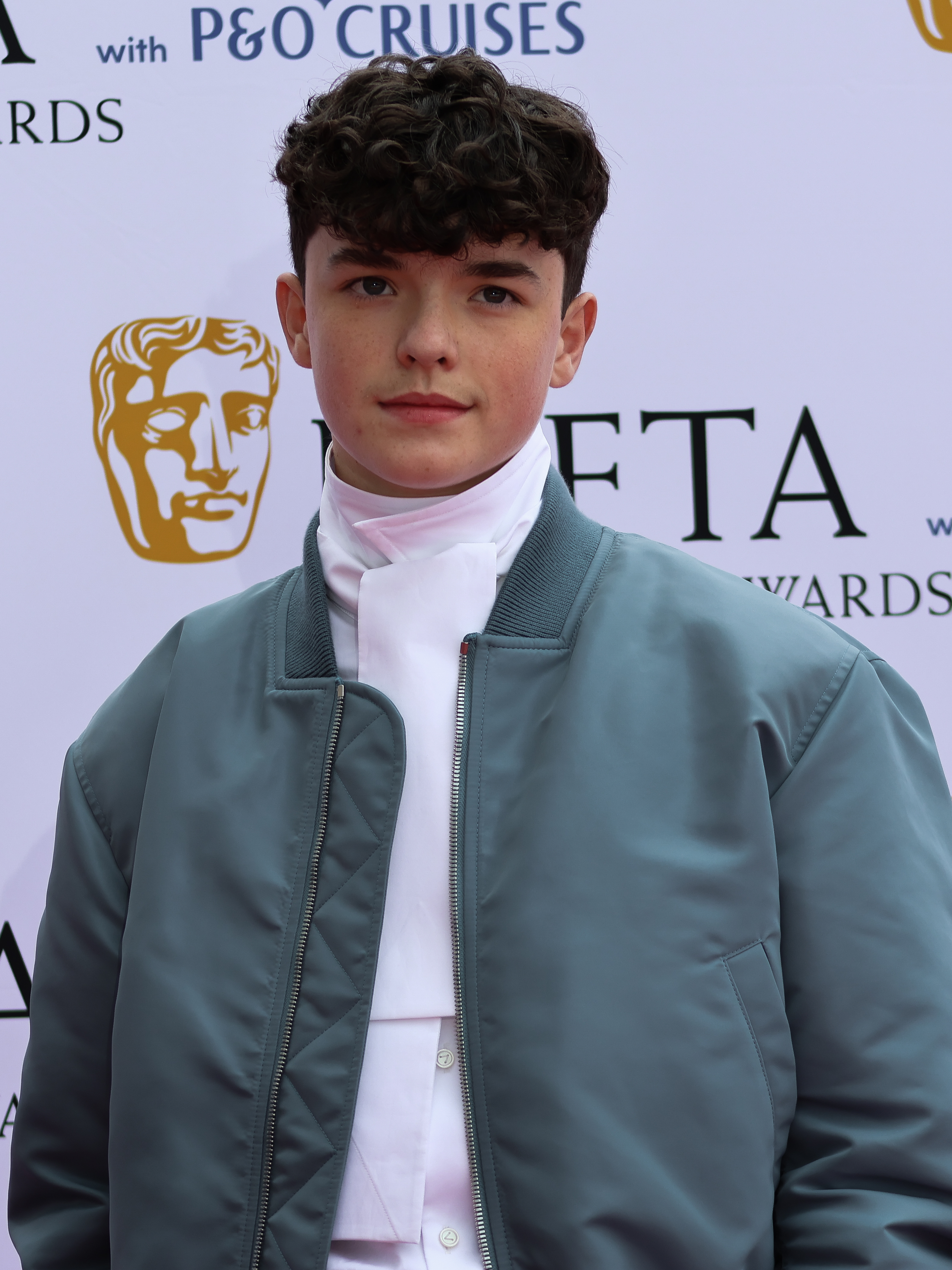
- The 2025 recipient: Owen Cooper
- Awarded for: Best Performance by an Actor in a Supporting Role in a Series, Miniseries, or Television Film
- Country: United States
- Presented by: Hollywood Foreign Press Association
- First award: February 5, 1971
- Currently held by: Owen Cooper, Adolescence (2025)

Highlights
- Most awards: Ed Asner (3)
- Most nominations: Sean Hayes; Jeremy Piven (6)
- Website: goldenglobes.com

The Golden Globe Award for Best Supporting Actor – Series, Miniseries, or Television Film is a Golden Globe Award presented annually by the Hollywood Foreign Press Association (HFPA). It is given in honor of an actor who has delivered an outstanding performance in a supporting role on a television series, miniseries or motion picture made for television for the calendar year. The award was first presented at the 28th Golden Globe Awards on February 5, 1971, to James Brolin for his role on Marcus Welby, M.D.. It was presented under the title Best Supporting Actor – Television Series before changing to its current title in 1980. For the 80th Golden Globe Awards, the category was split into two categories: Comedy/Drama Series and Limited or Anthology Series or Television Film.

Since its inception, the award has been given to 59 actors. Owen Cooper is the current recipient of the award for his portrayal of Jamie Miller on Adolescence. Ed Asner has won the most awards in this category, winning three times. Sean Hayes and Jeremy Piven have each been nominated for the award on six occasions, the most within the category. Owen Cooper at the age of 16, was awarded as the youngest recipient of the award.

== Winners and nominees ==
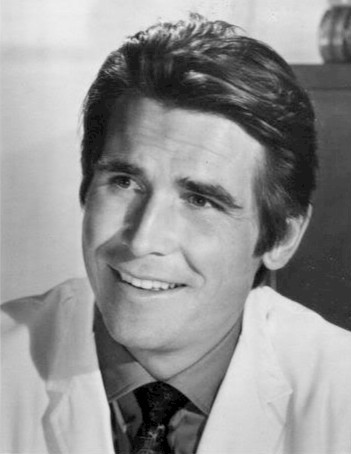
James Brolin was the first winner in this category for Marcus Welby, M.D. (1970, 1972).

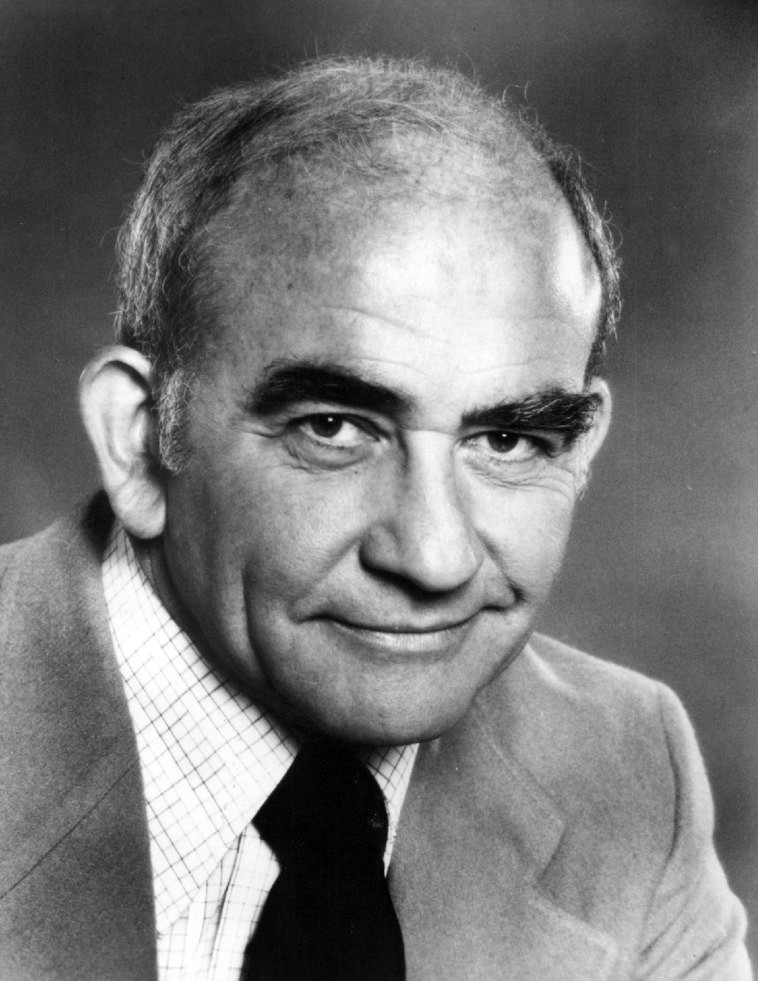
Ed Asner won thrice for The Mary Tyler Moore Show (1971, 1975) and Rich Man, Poor Man (1976).

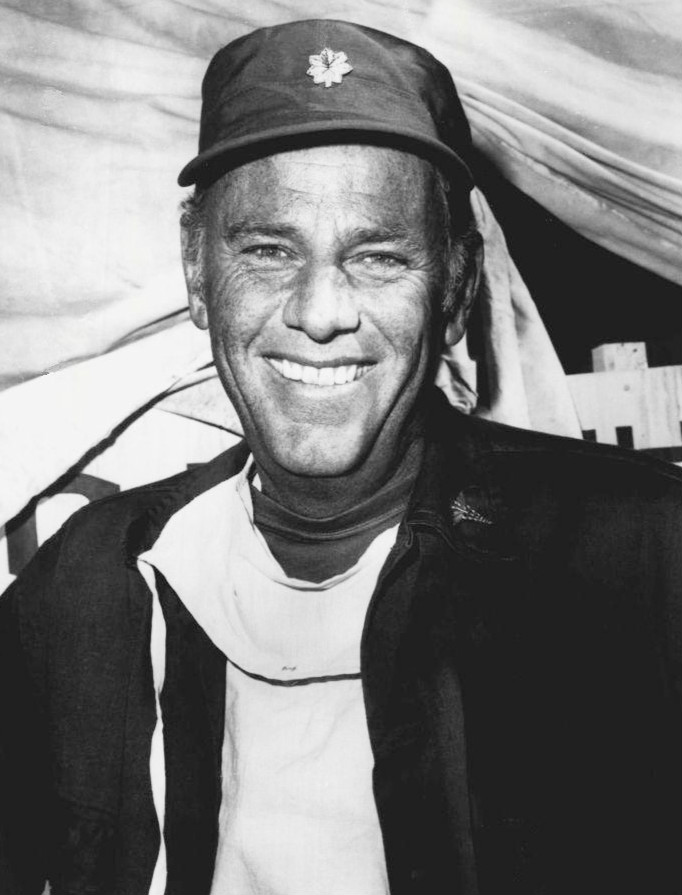
McLean Stevenson won for M*A*S*H (1973)

Harvey Korman won for The Carol Burnett Show (1974).

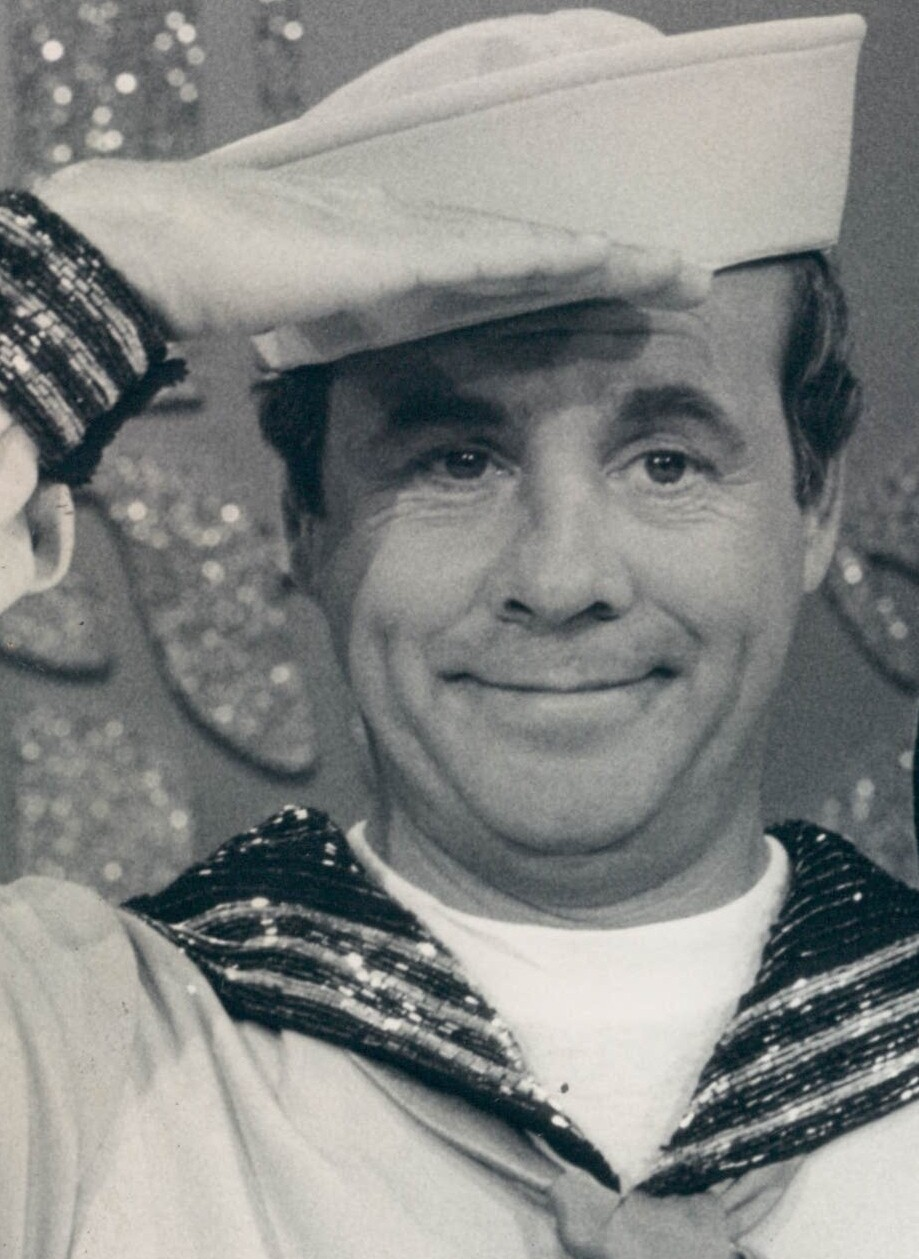
Tim Conway won for The Carol Burnett Show (1975).

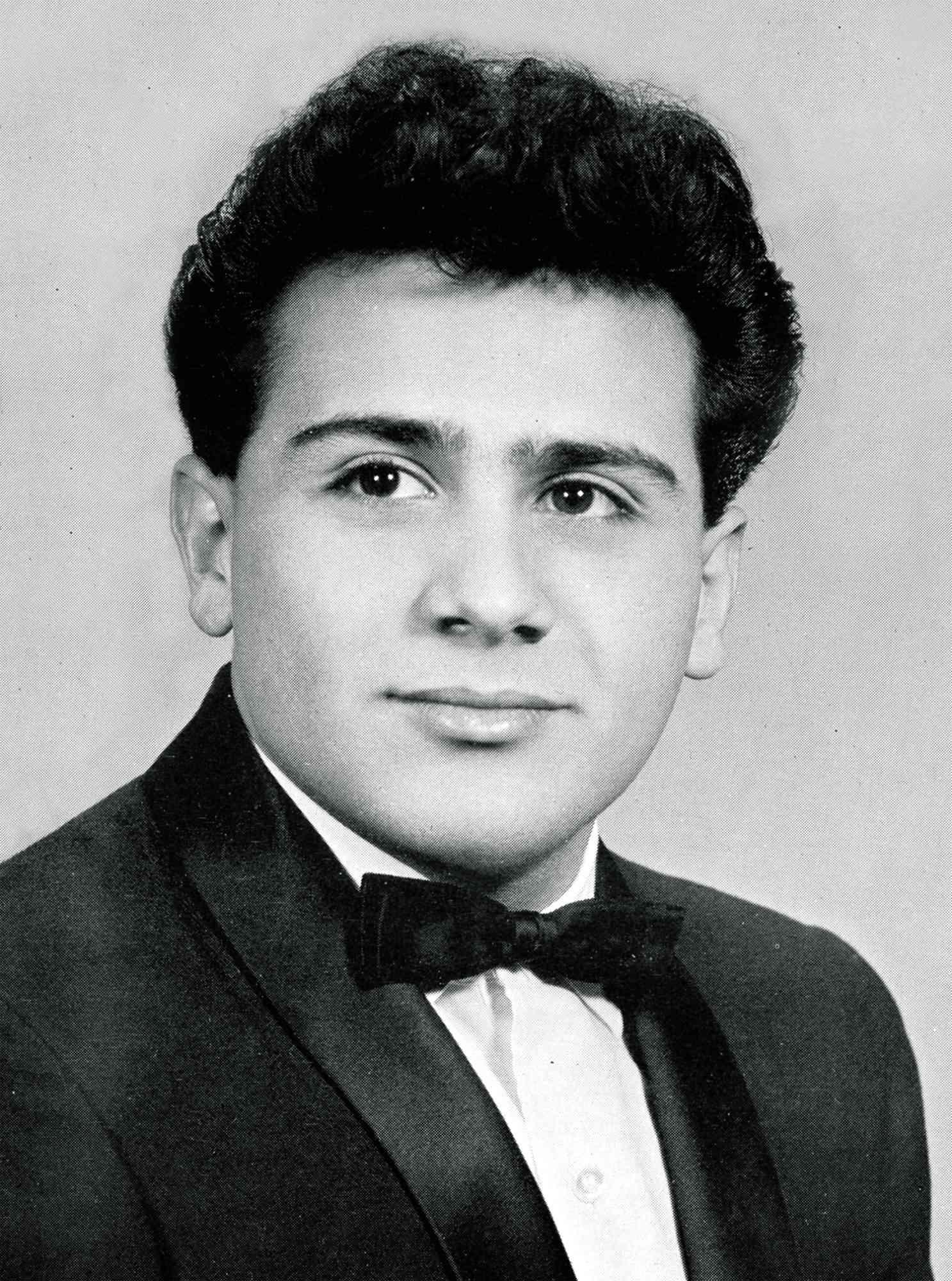
Danny DeVito won for Taxi (1979).

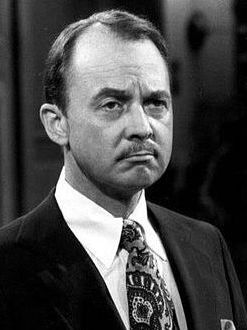
John Hillerman won for Magnum P.I. (1981)

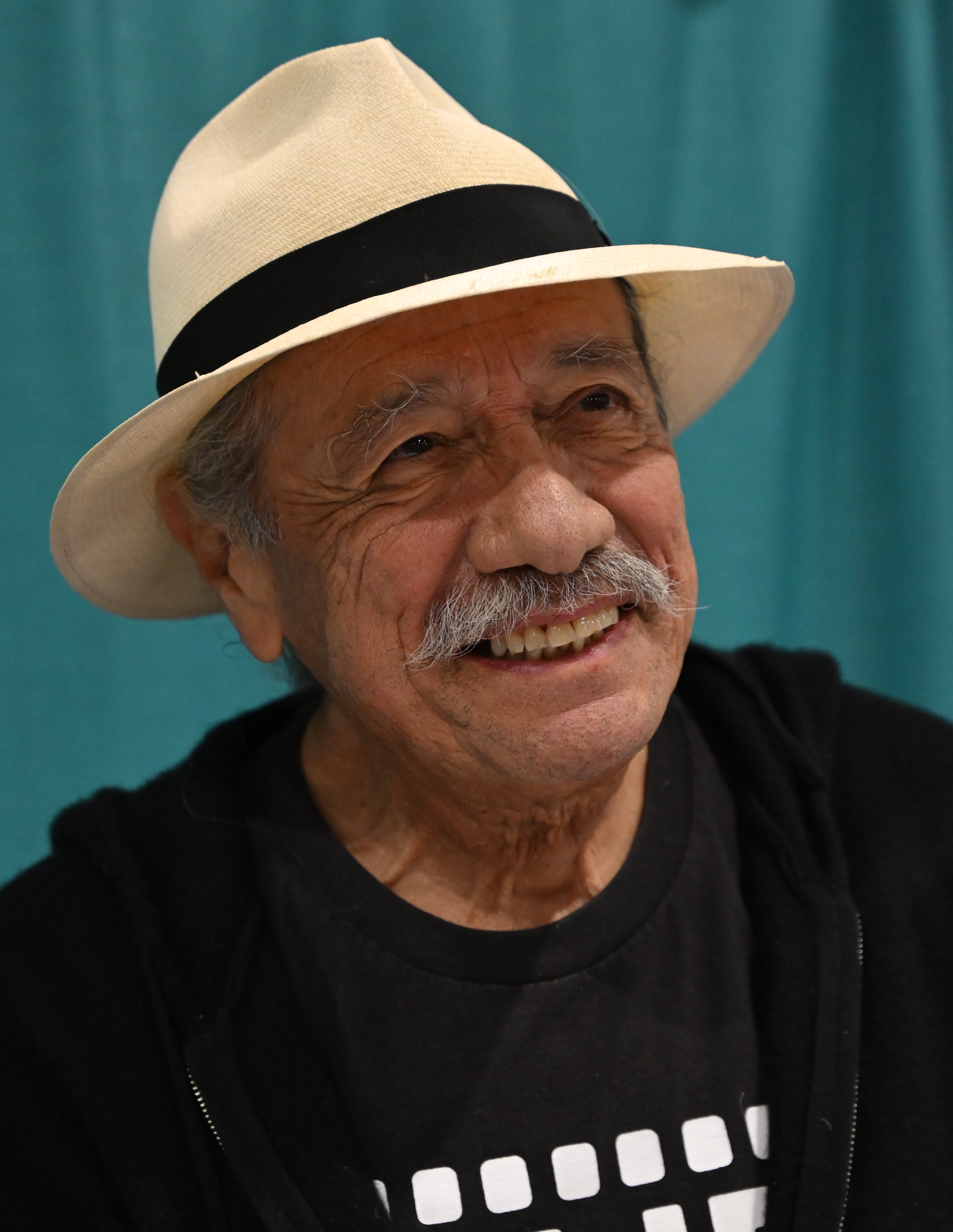
Edward James Olmos won twice for Miami Vice (1985) and The Burning Season (1994).

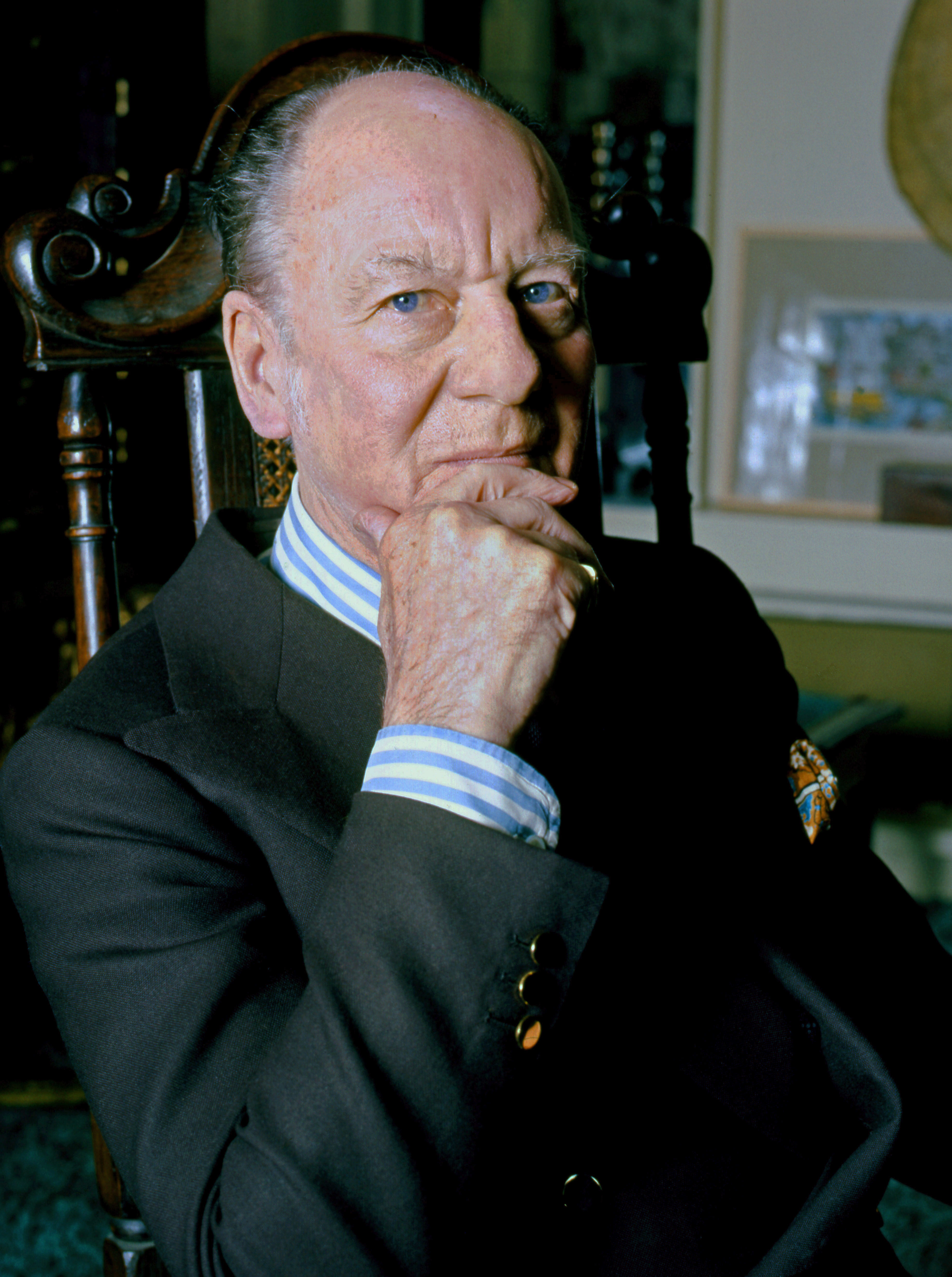
Sir John Gielgud won for War and Remembrance (1988)

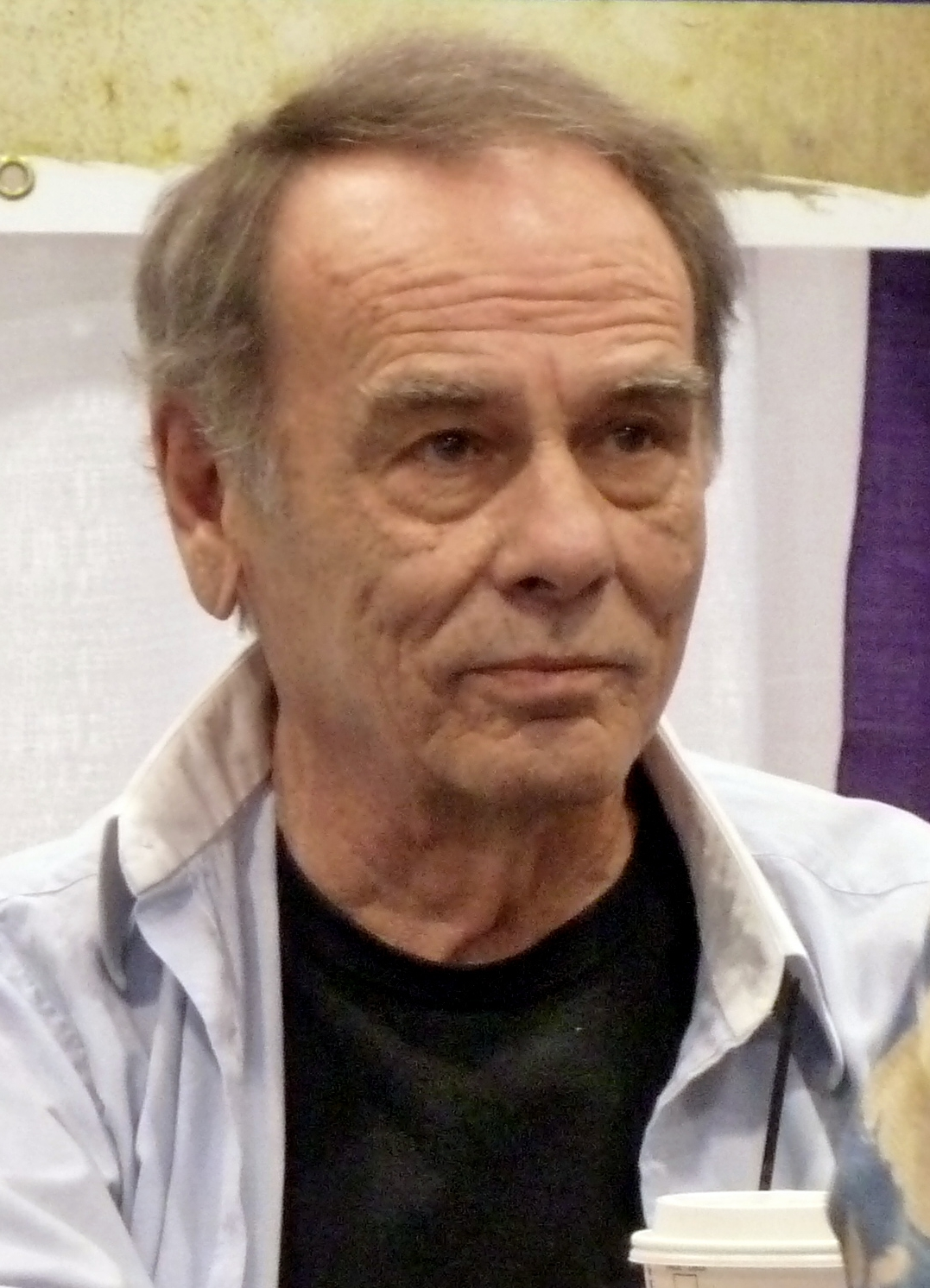
Dean Stockwell won for Quantum Leap (1988).

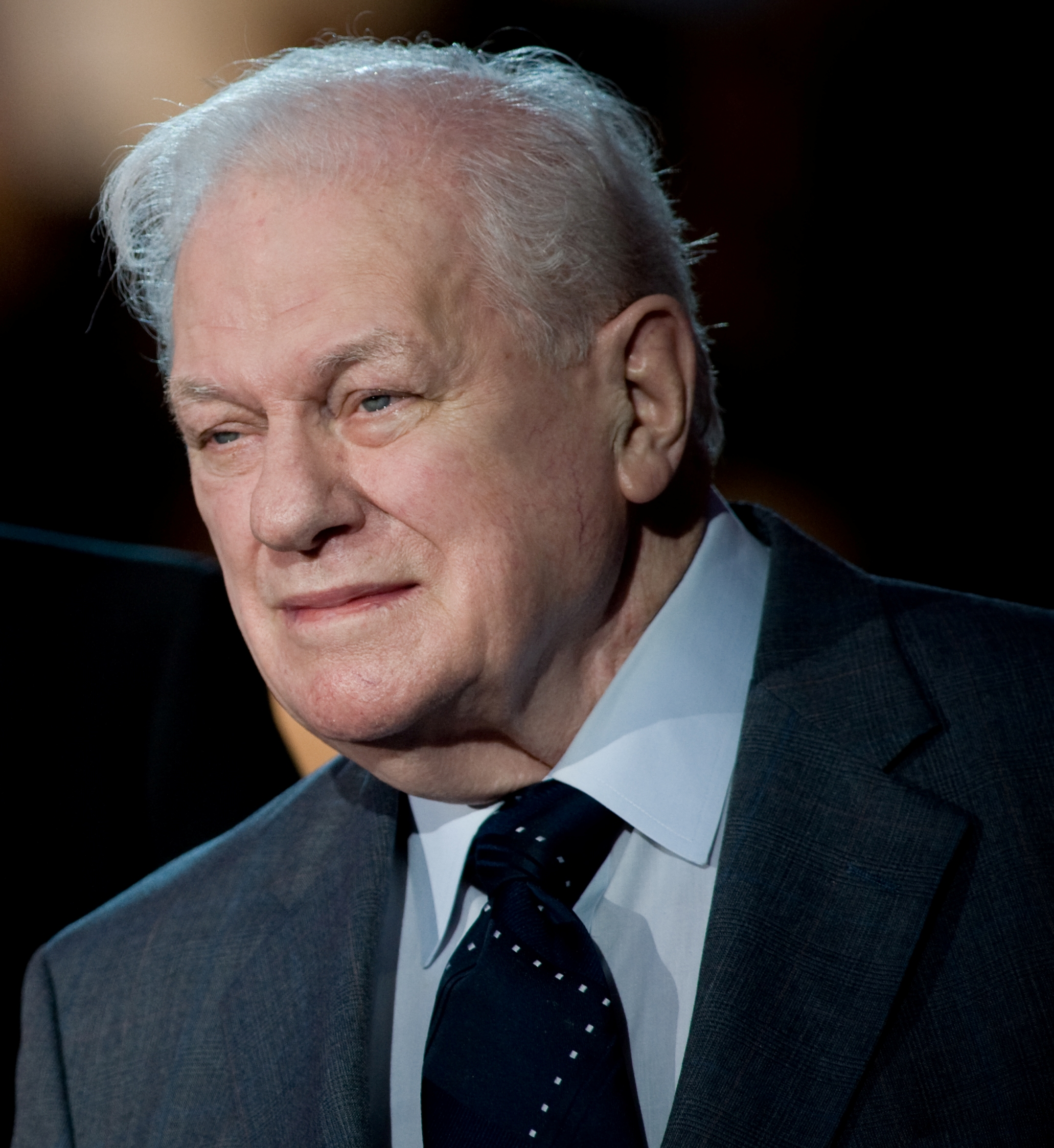
Charles Durning won for The Kennedys of Massachusetts (1990).

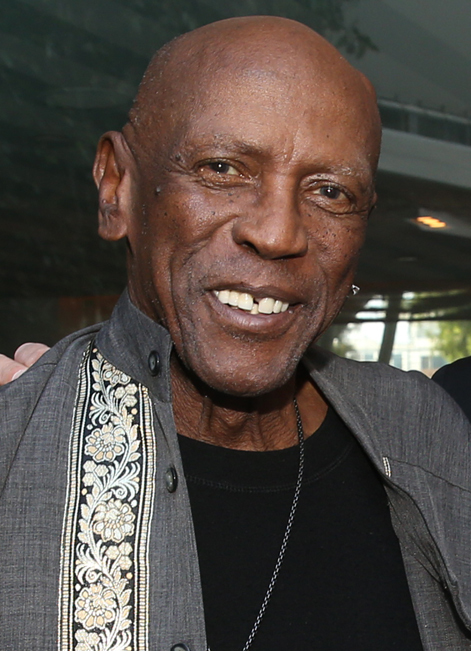
Louis Gossett Jr. won for The Josephine Baker Story (1991).

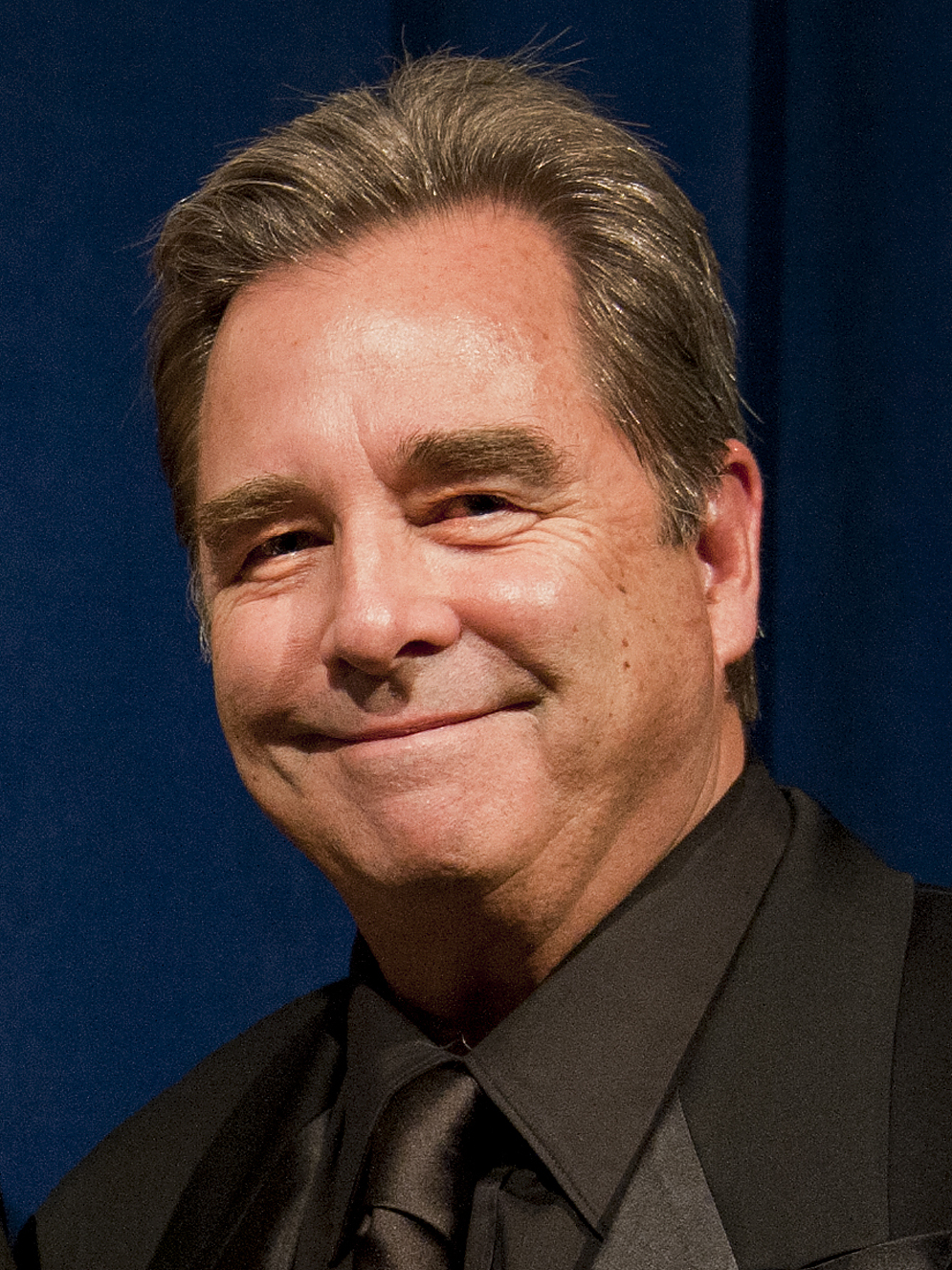
Beau Bridges won for The Positively True Adventures of the Alleged Texas Cheerleader-Murdering Mom (1993).

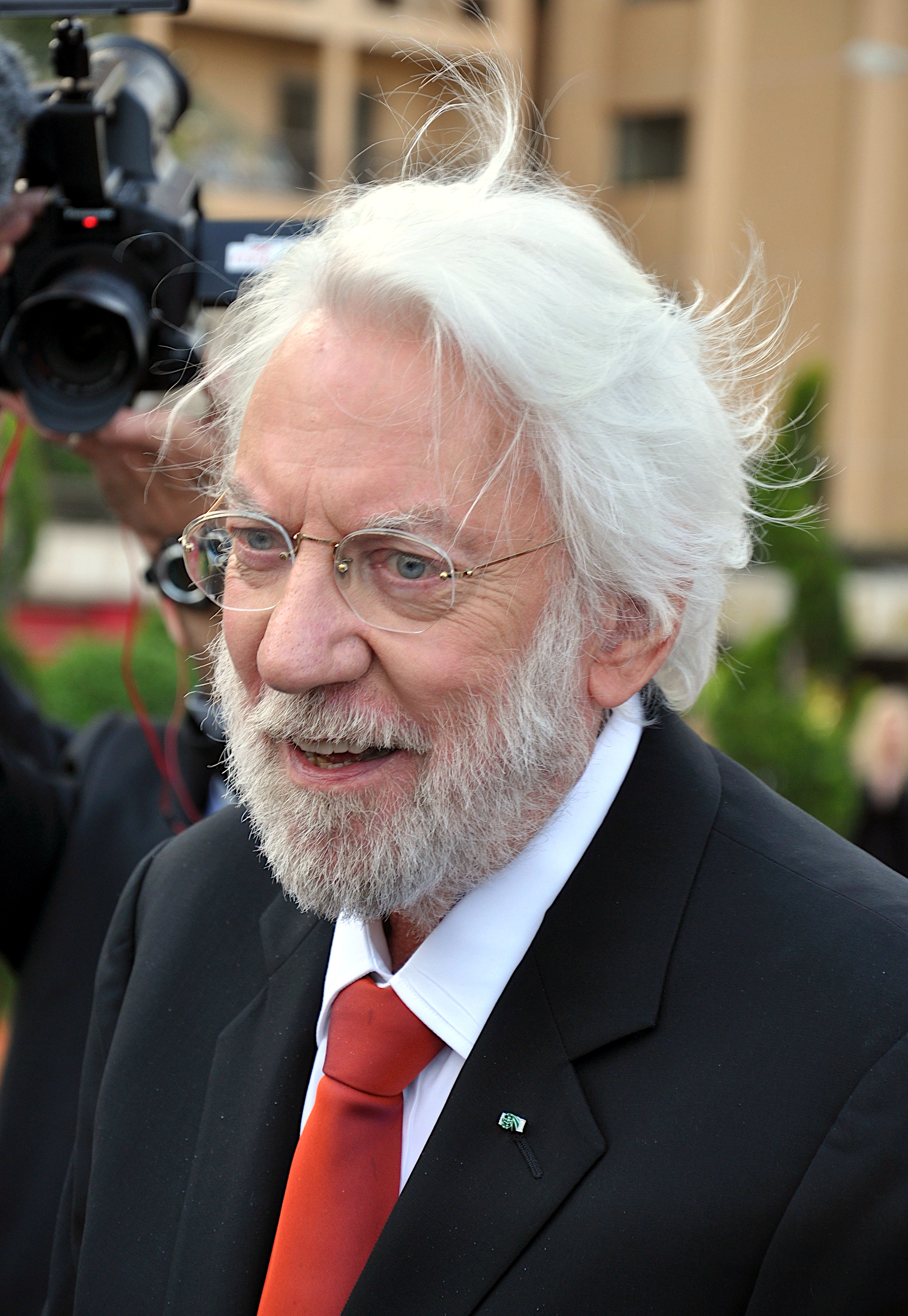
Donald Sutherland won twice for Citizen X (1995) and Path to War (2002).

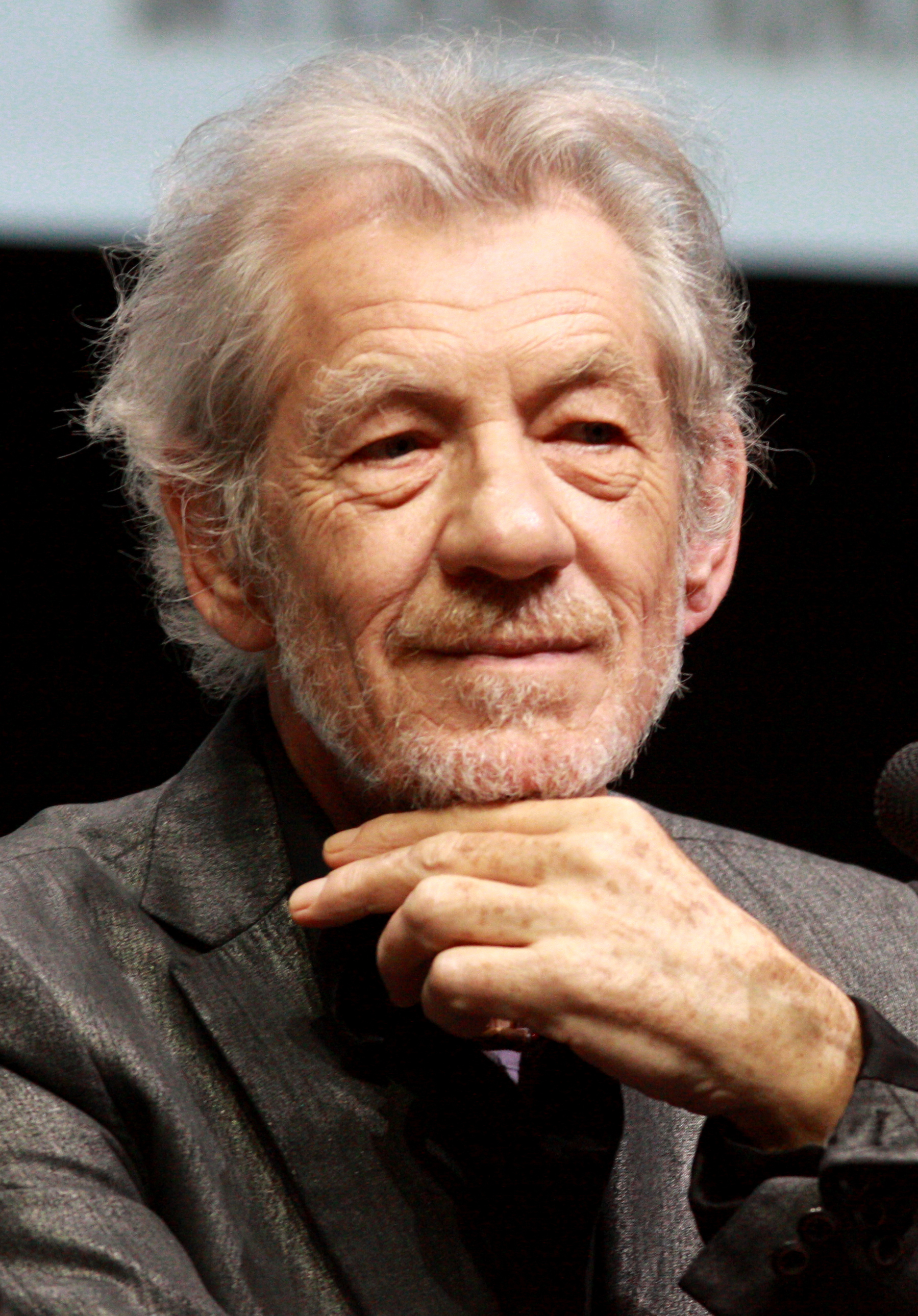
Ian McKellen won for Rasputin: Dark Servant of Destiny (1996).

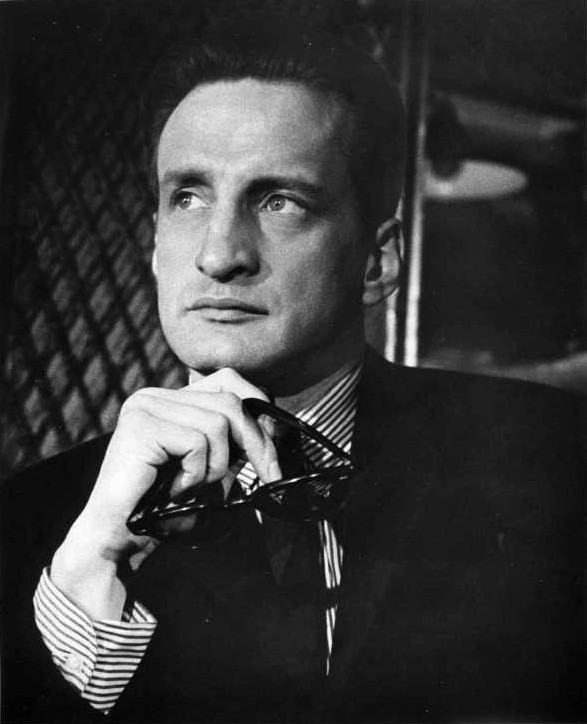
George C. Scott won for 12 Angry Men (1997).

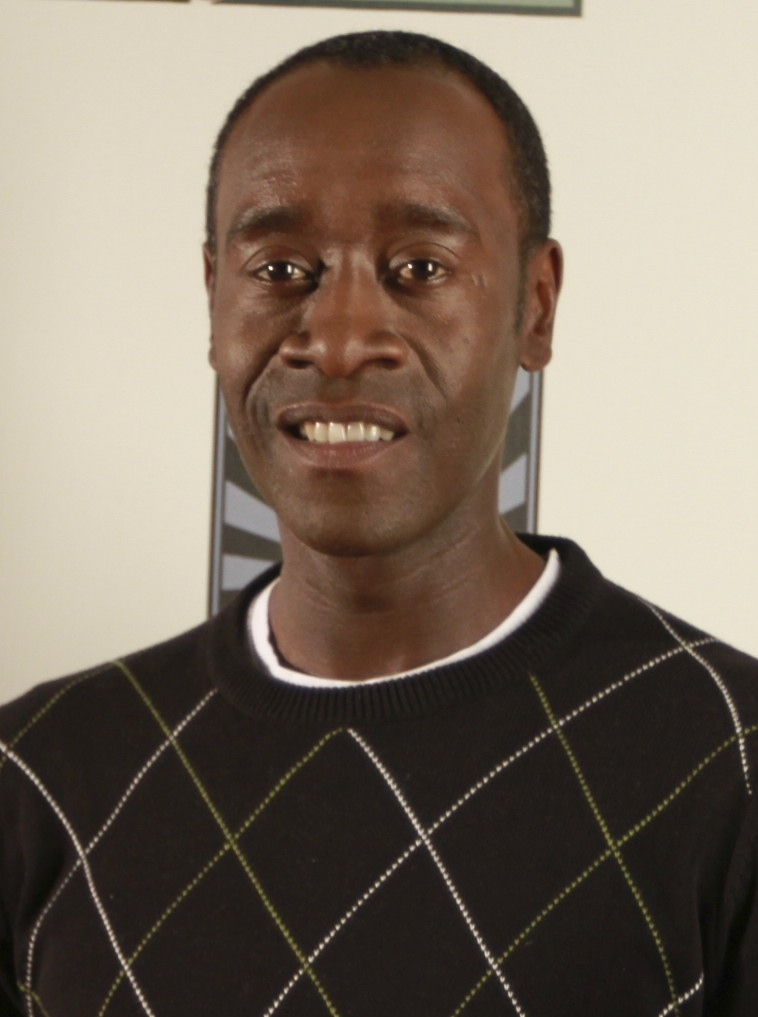
Don Cheadle won for The Rat Pack (1998).

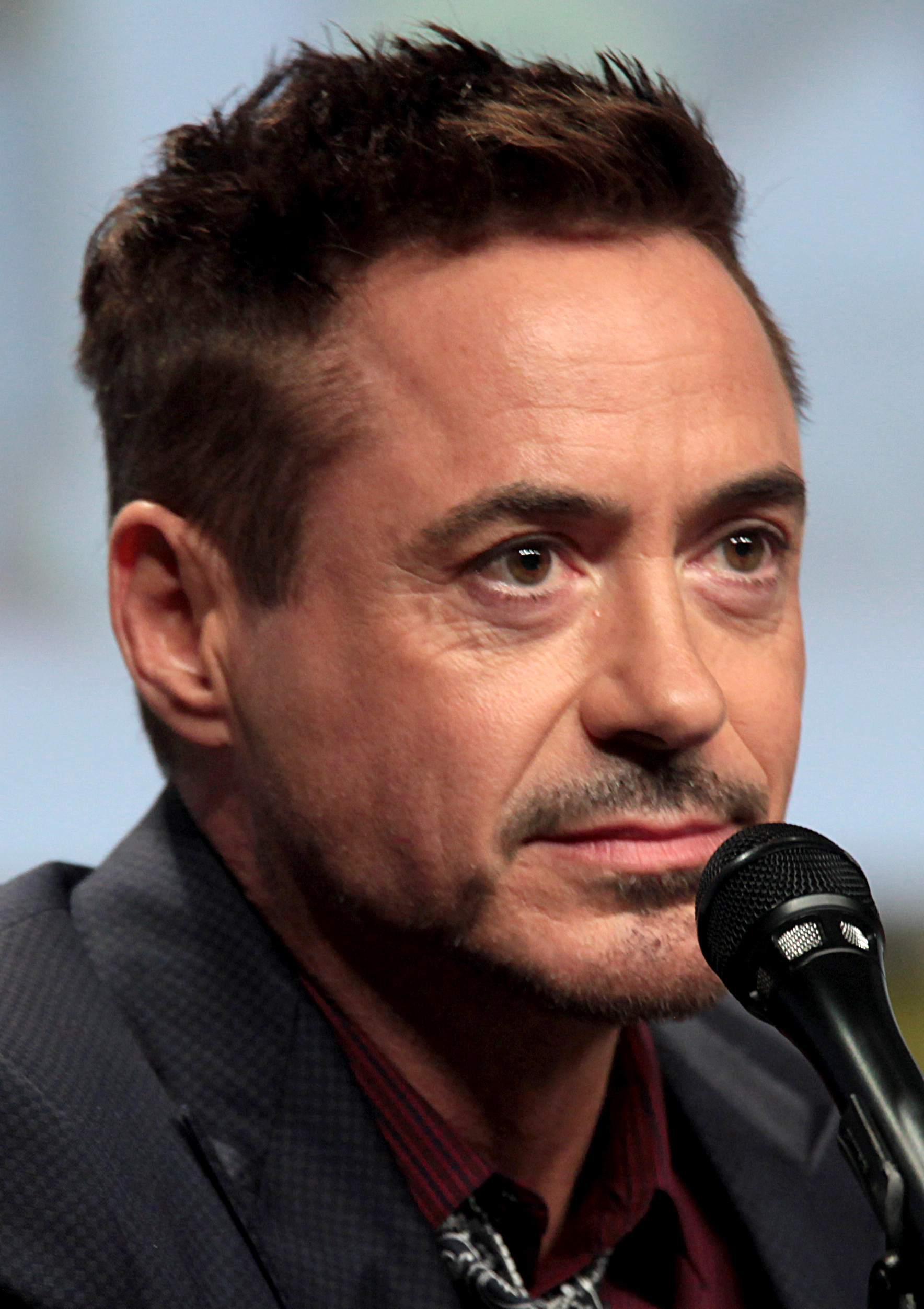
Robert Downey Jr. won for Ally McBeal (2000).

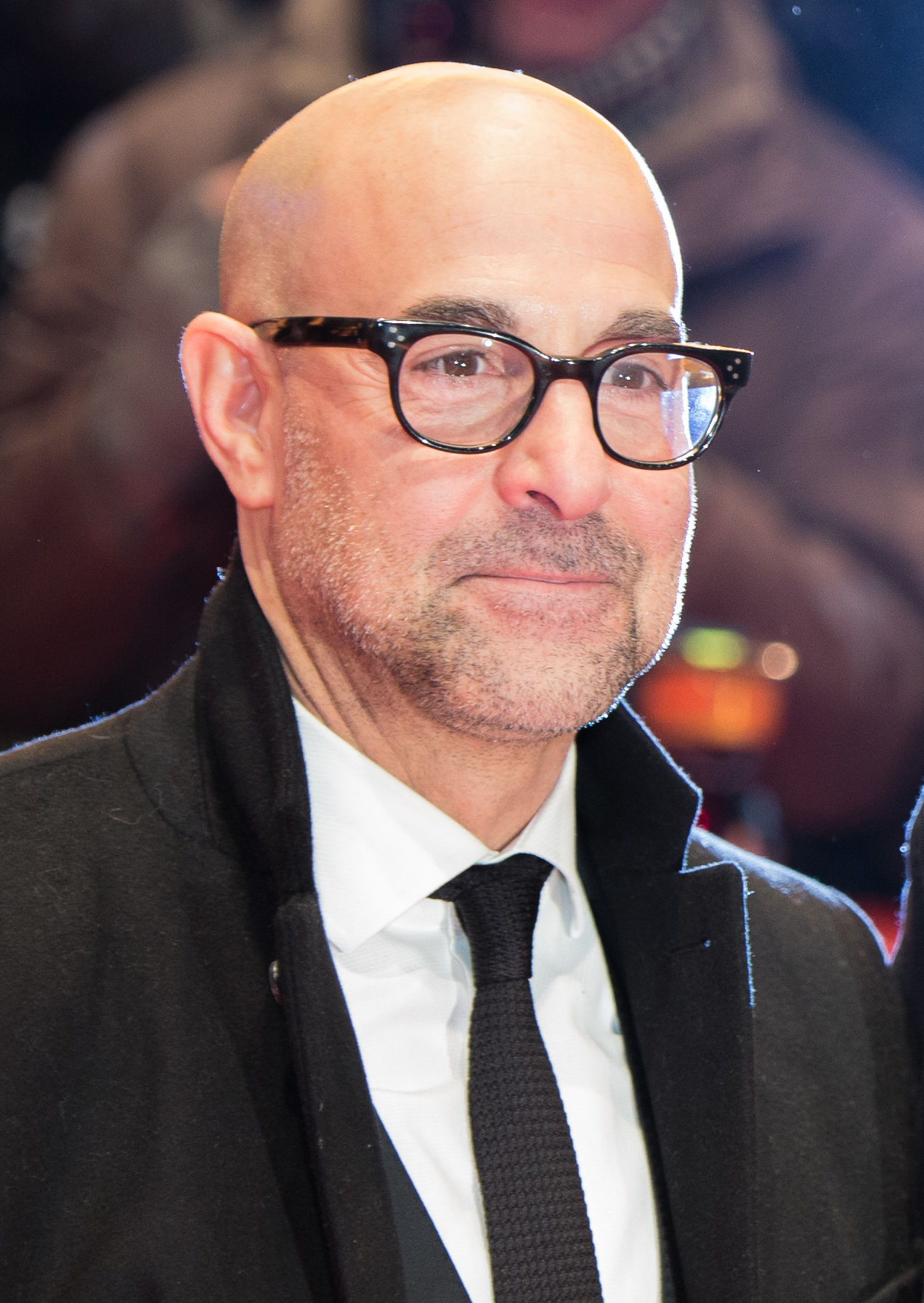
Stanley Tucci won for Conspiracy (2001).

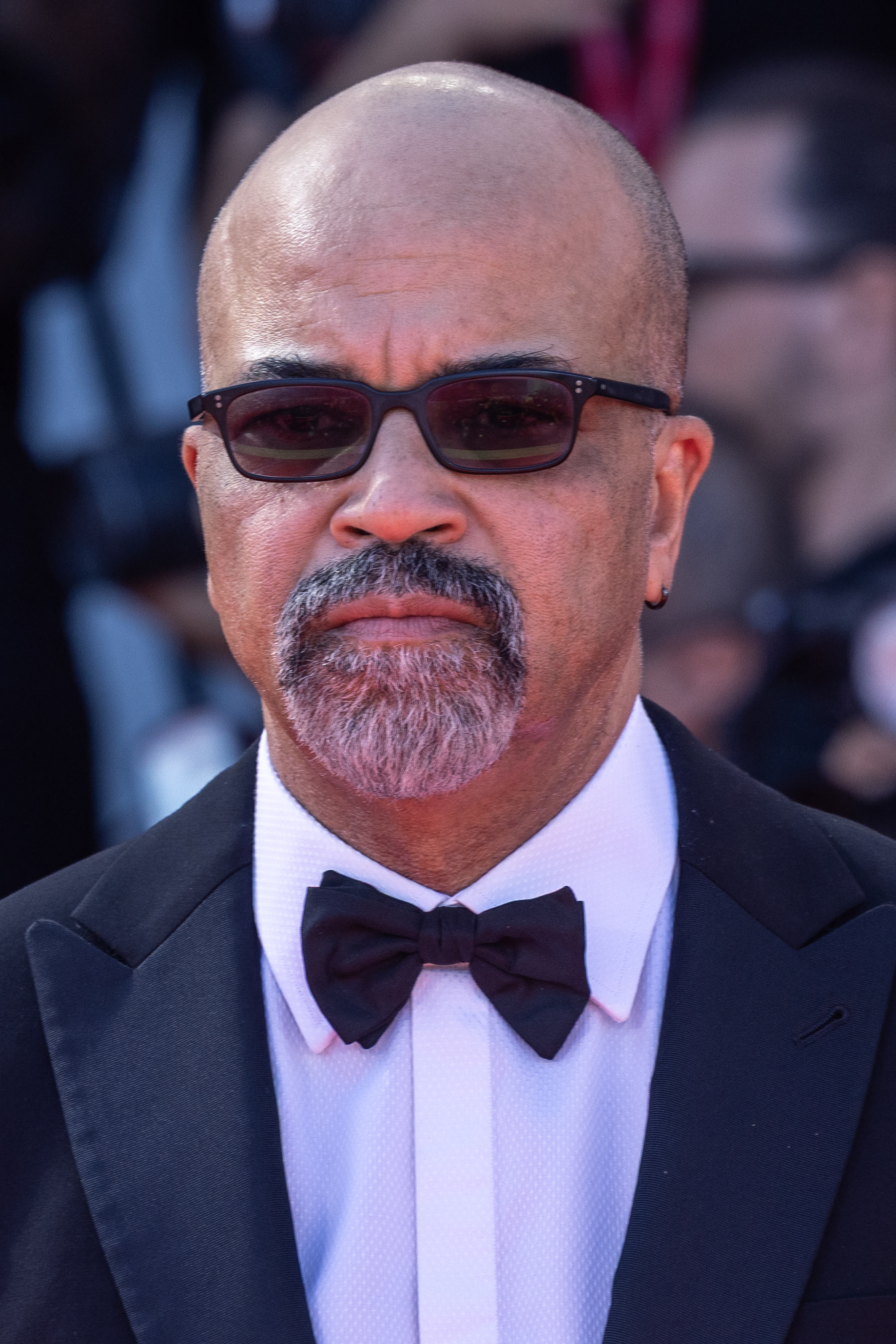
Jeffrey Wright won for Angels in America (2003).

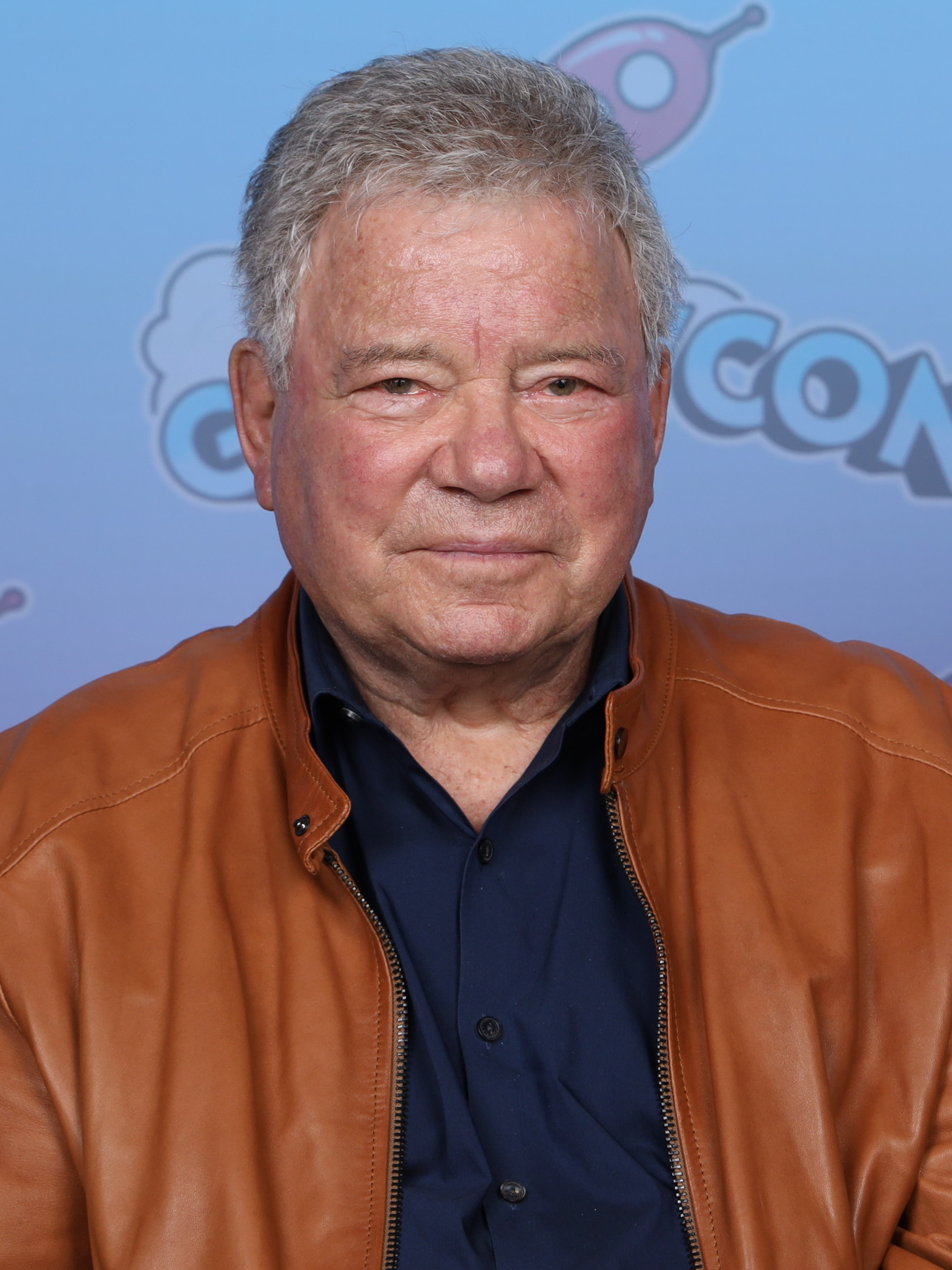
William Shatner won for Boston Legal (2004).

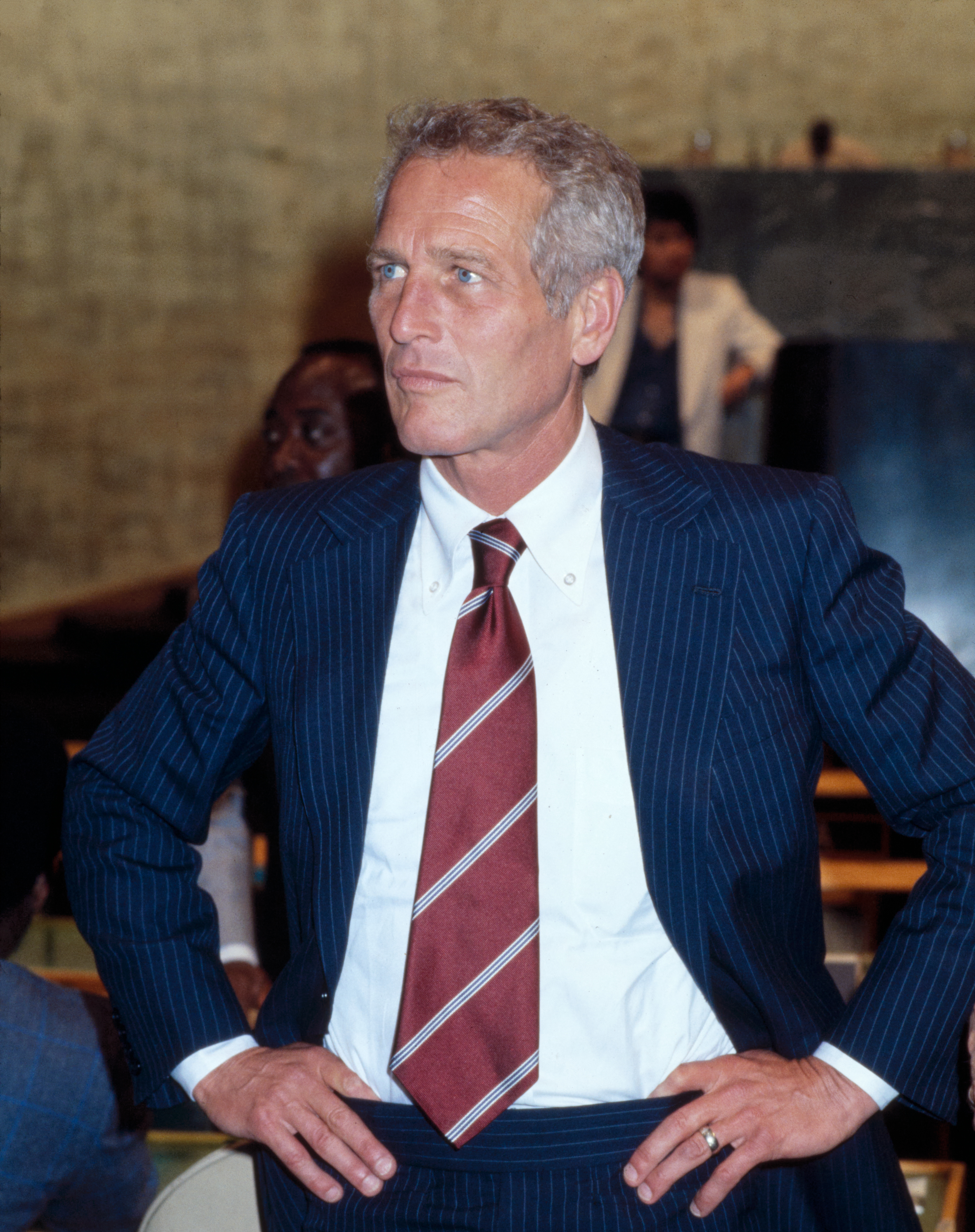
Paul Newman won for Empire Falls (2005).

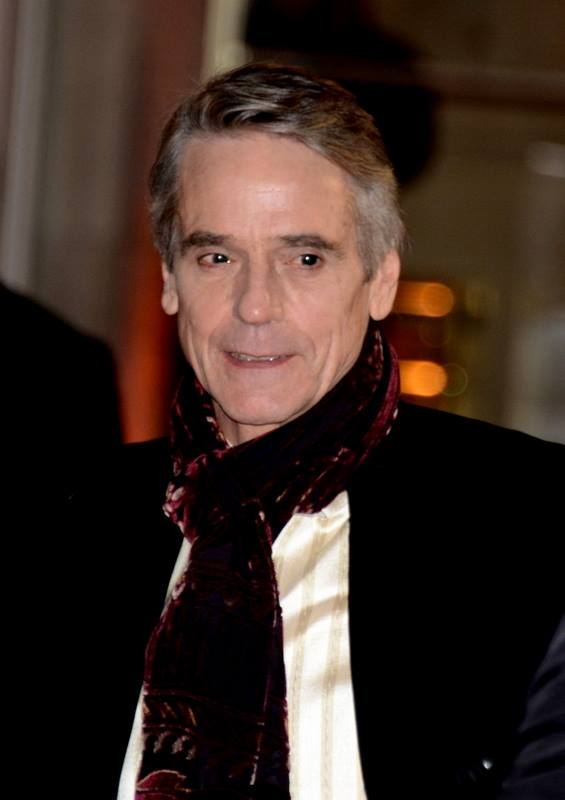
Jeremy Irons won for Elizabeth I (2006).

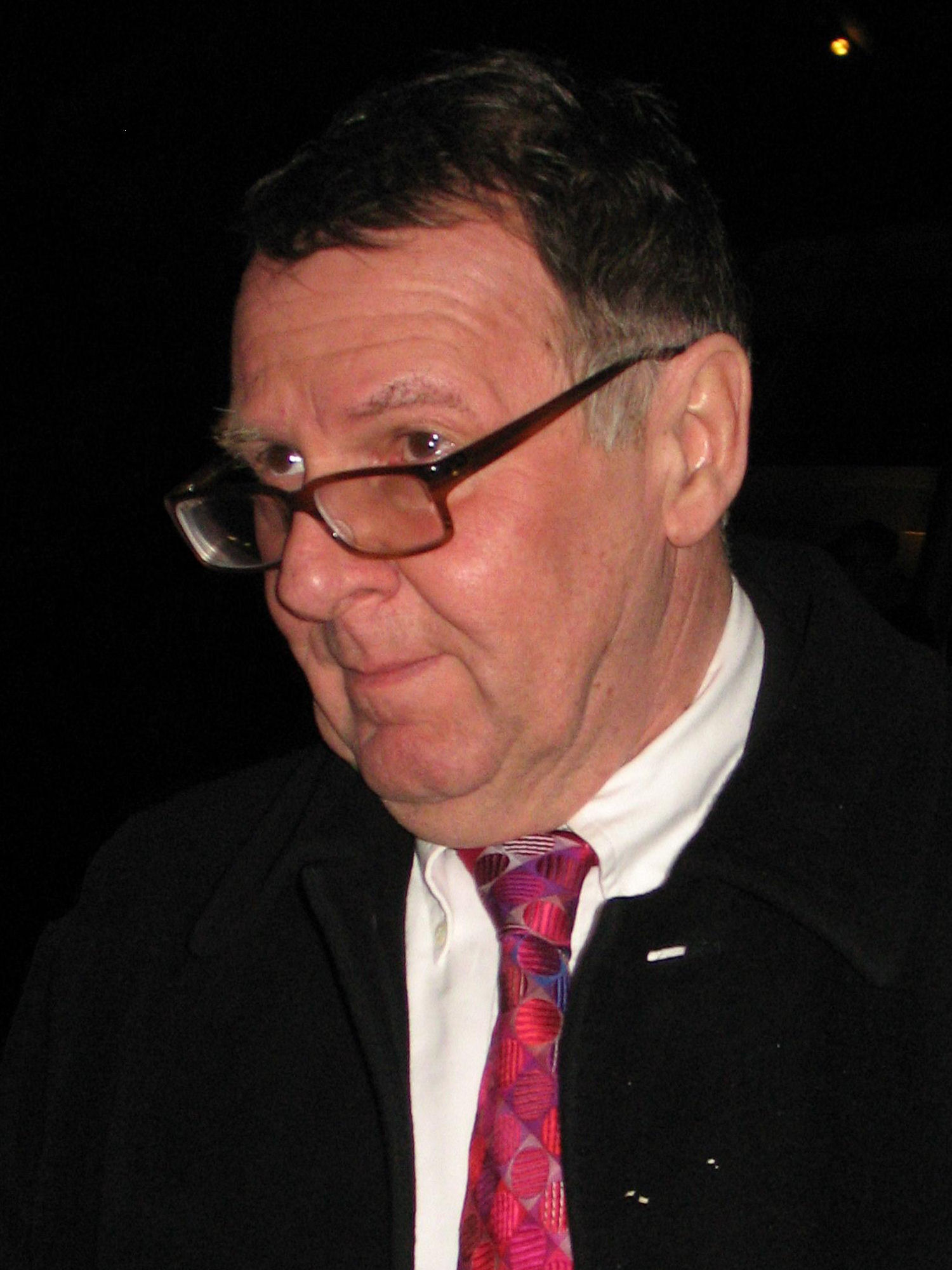
Tom Wilkinson won for John Adams (2008).

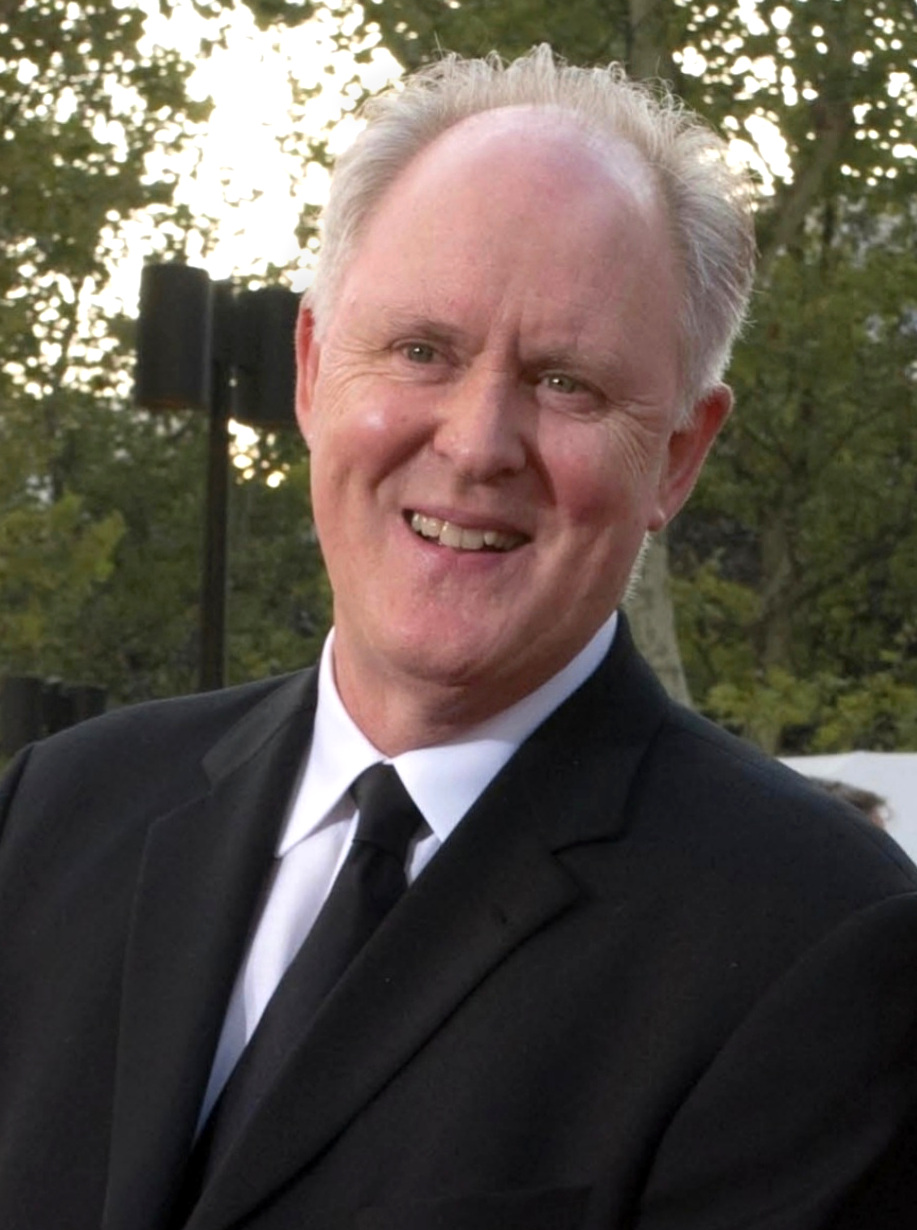
John Lithgow won for Dexter.

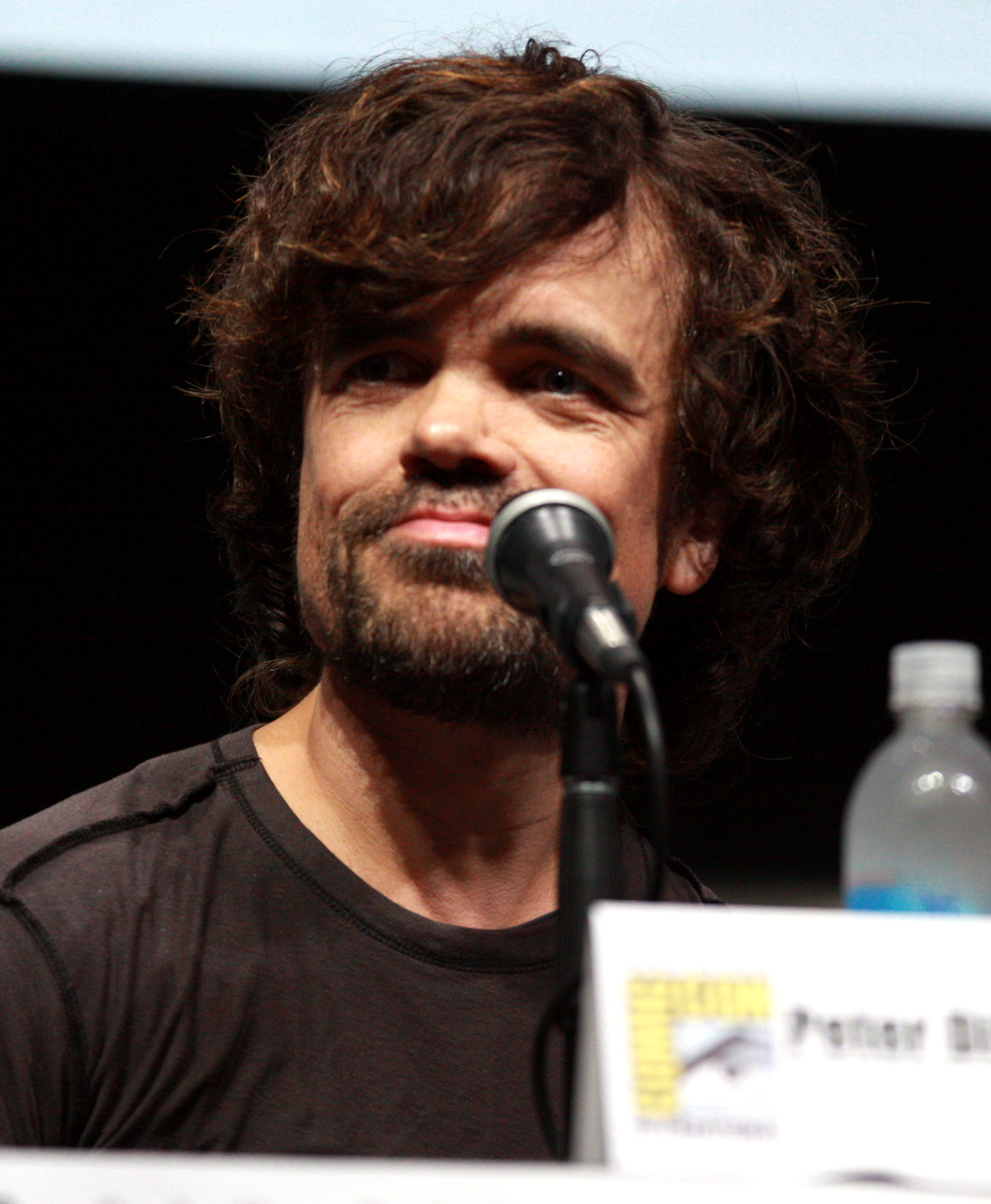
Peter Dinklage won for Game of Thrones (2011).

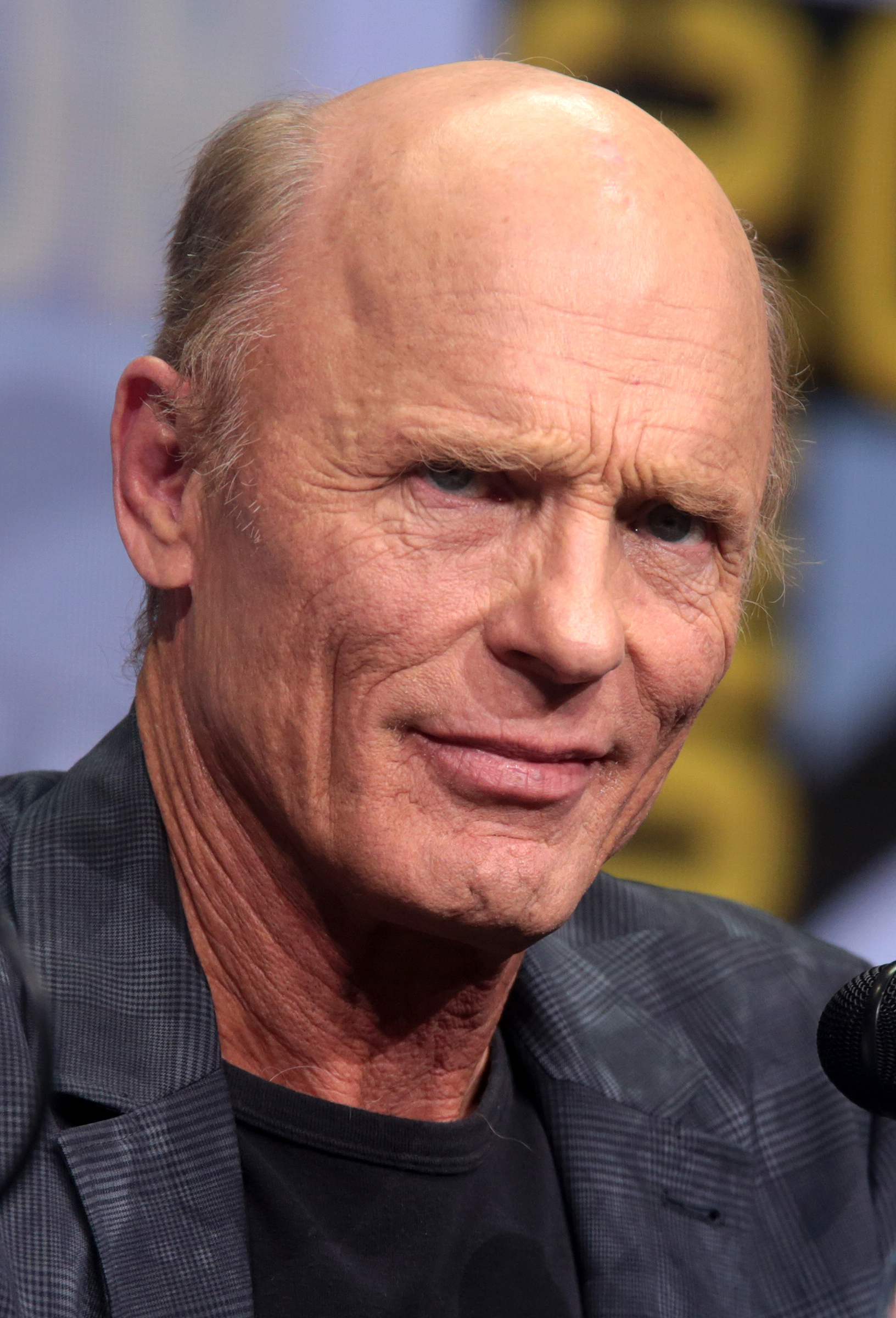
Ed Harris won for Game Change (2012).

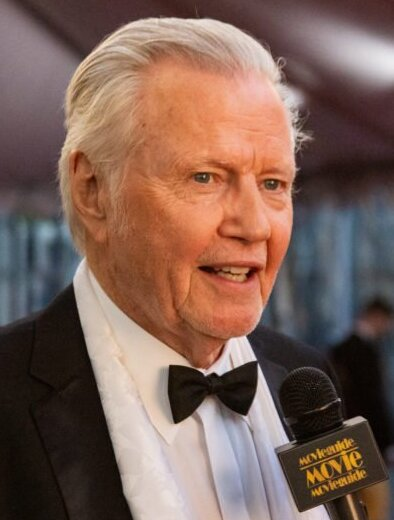
Jon Voight won for Ray Donovan (2013).

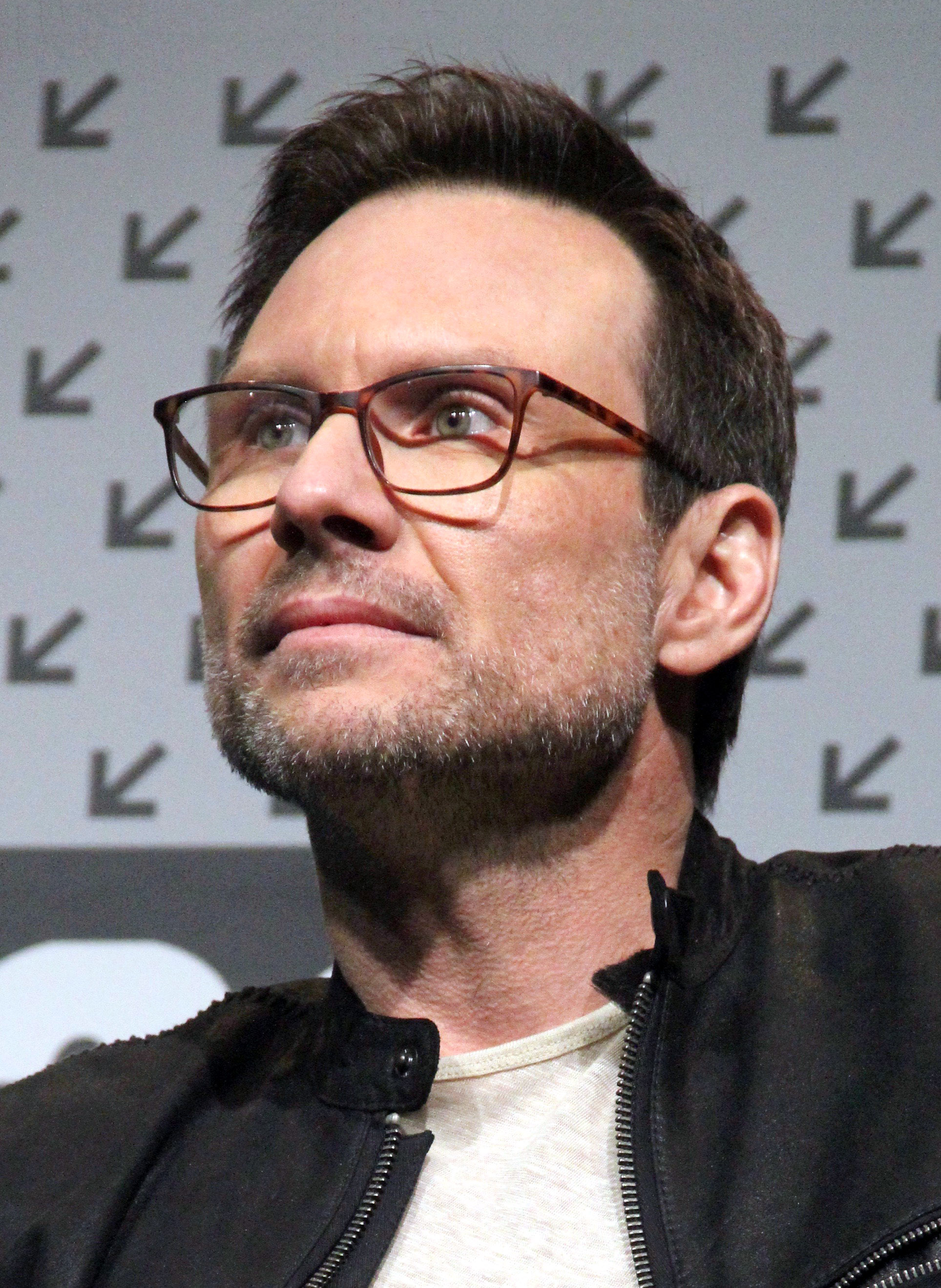
Christian Slater won for Mr. Robot (2015).

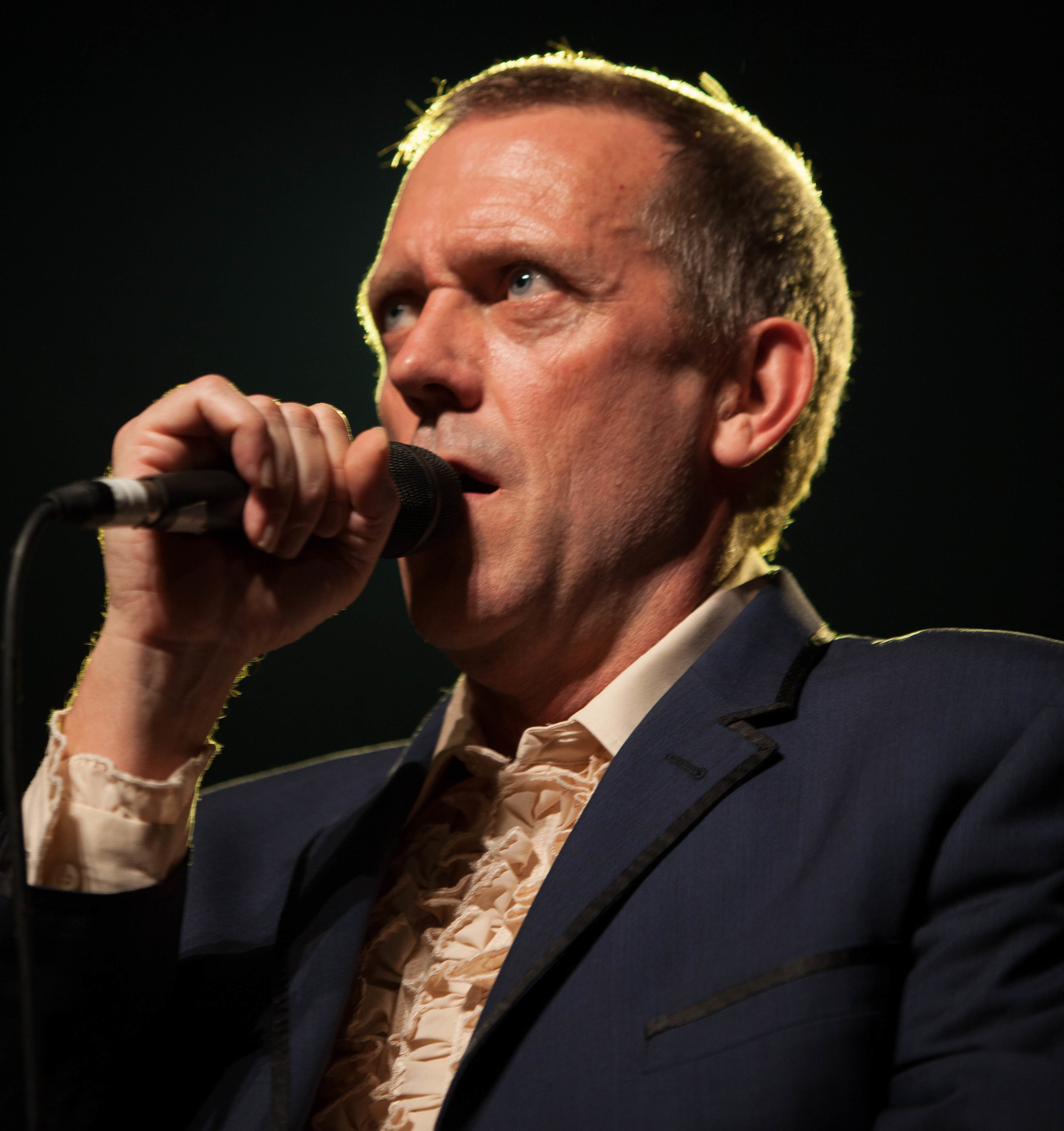
Hugh Laurie won for The Night Manager (2016).

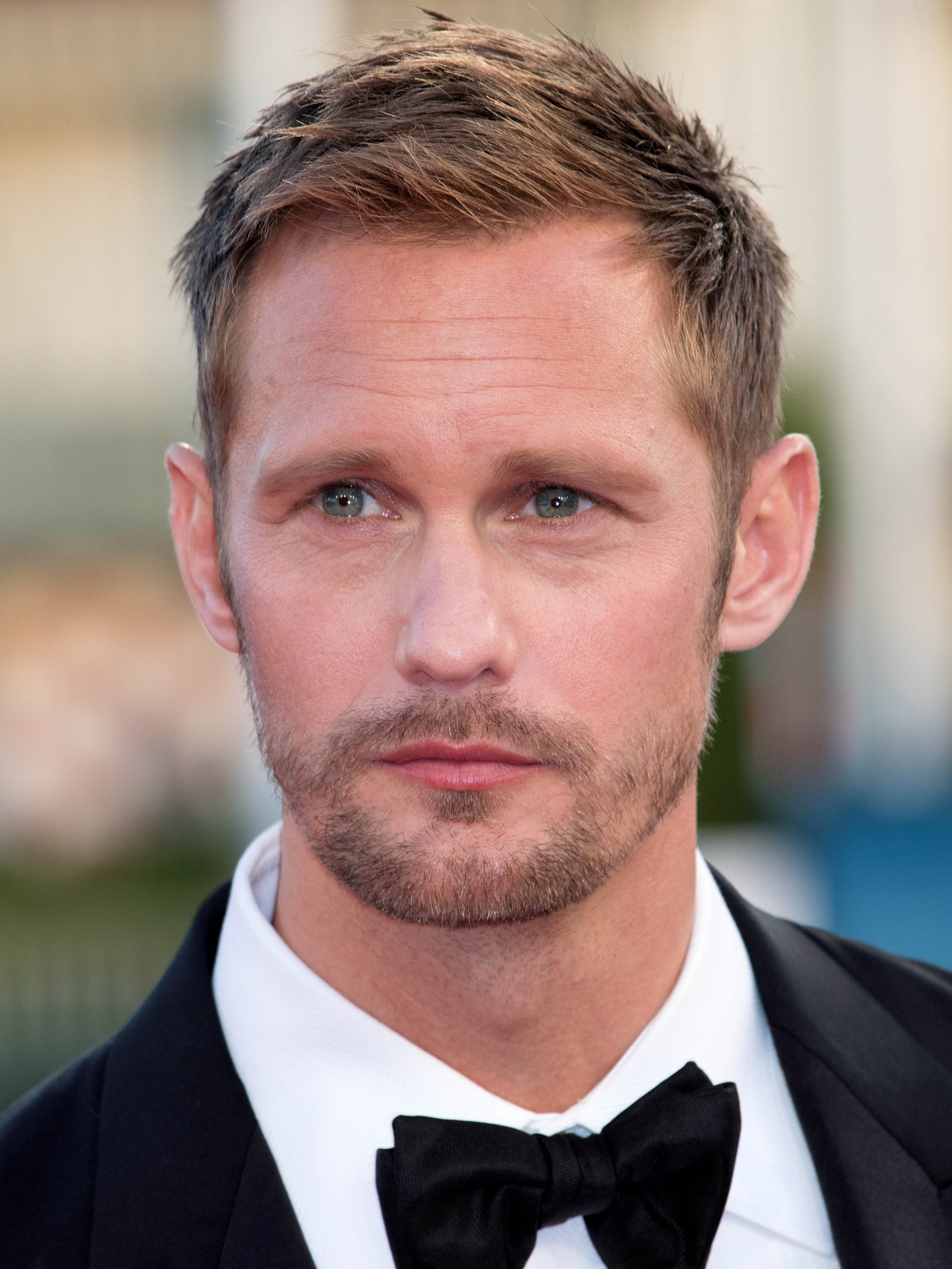
Alexander Skarsgard won for Big Little Lies (2017).

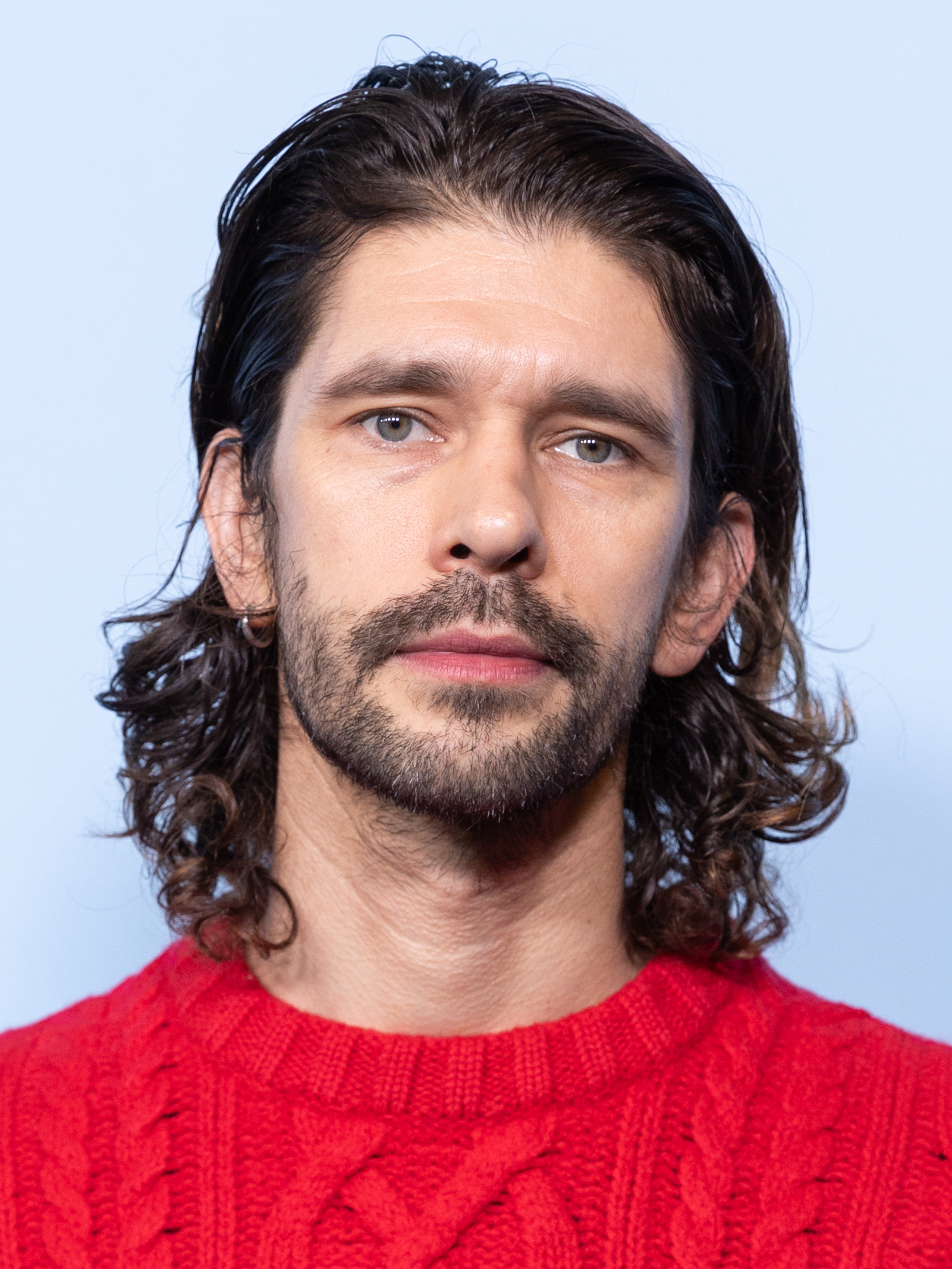
Ben Whishaw won for A Very English Scandal (2018).

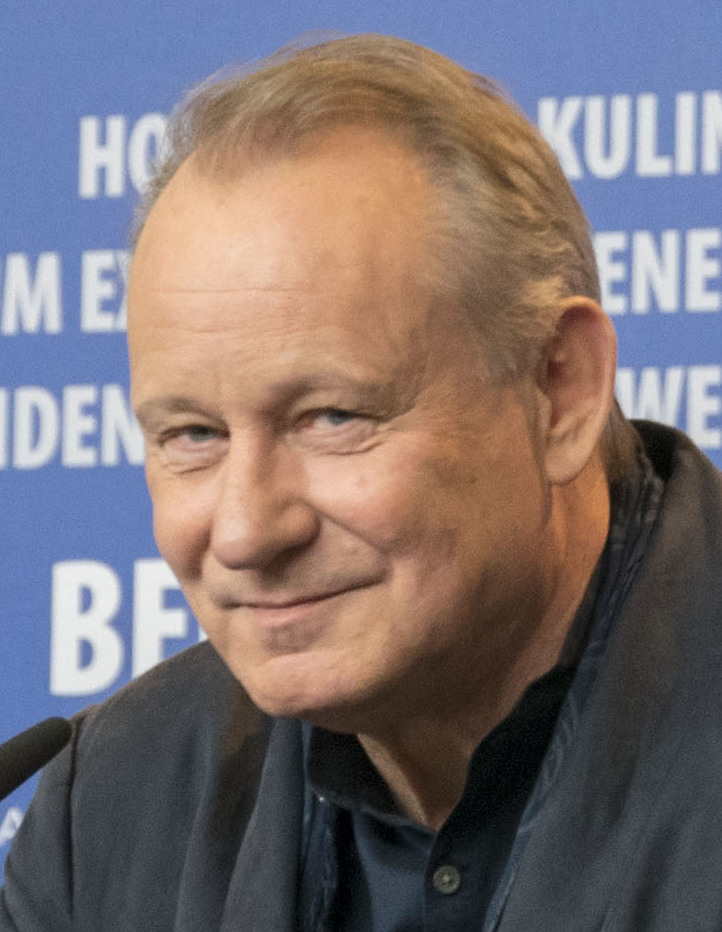
Stellan Skarsgard won for Chernobyl (2019).

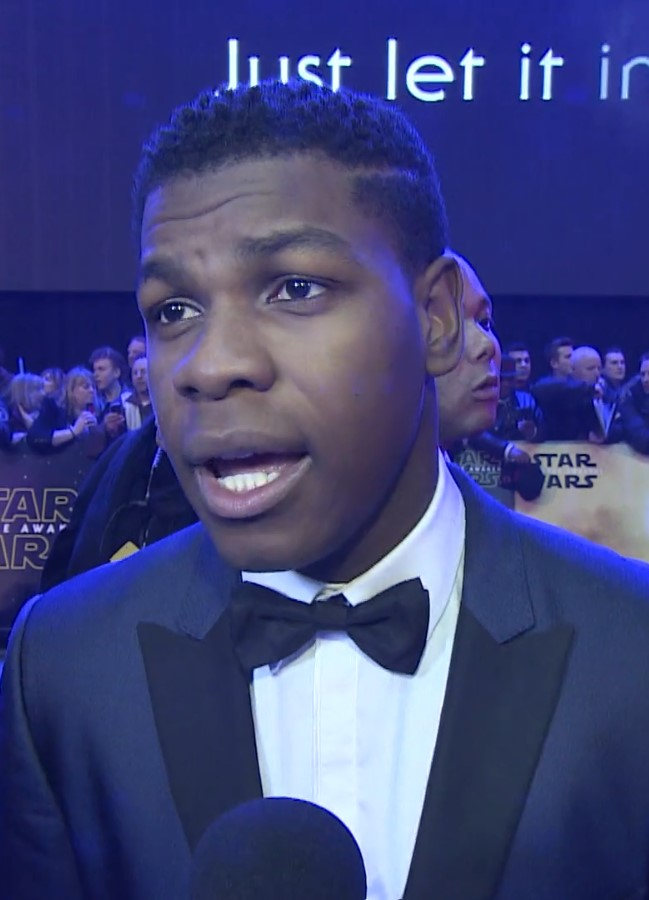
John Boyega won for Small Axe (2020).

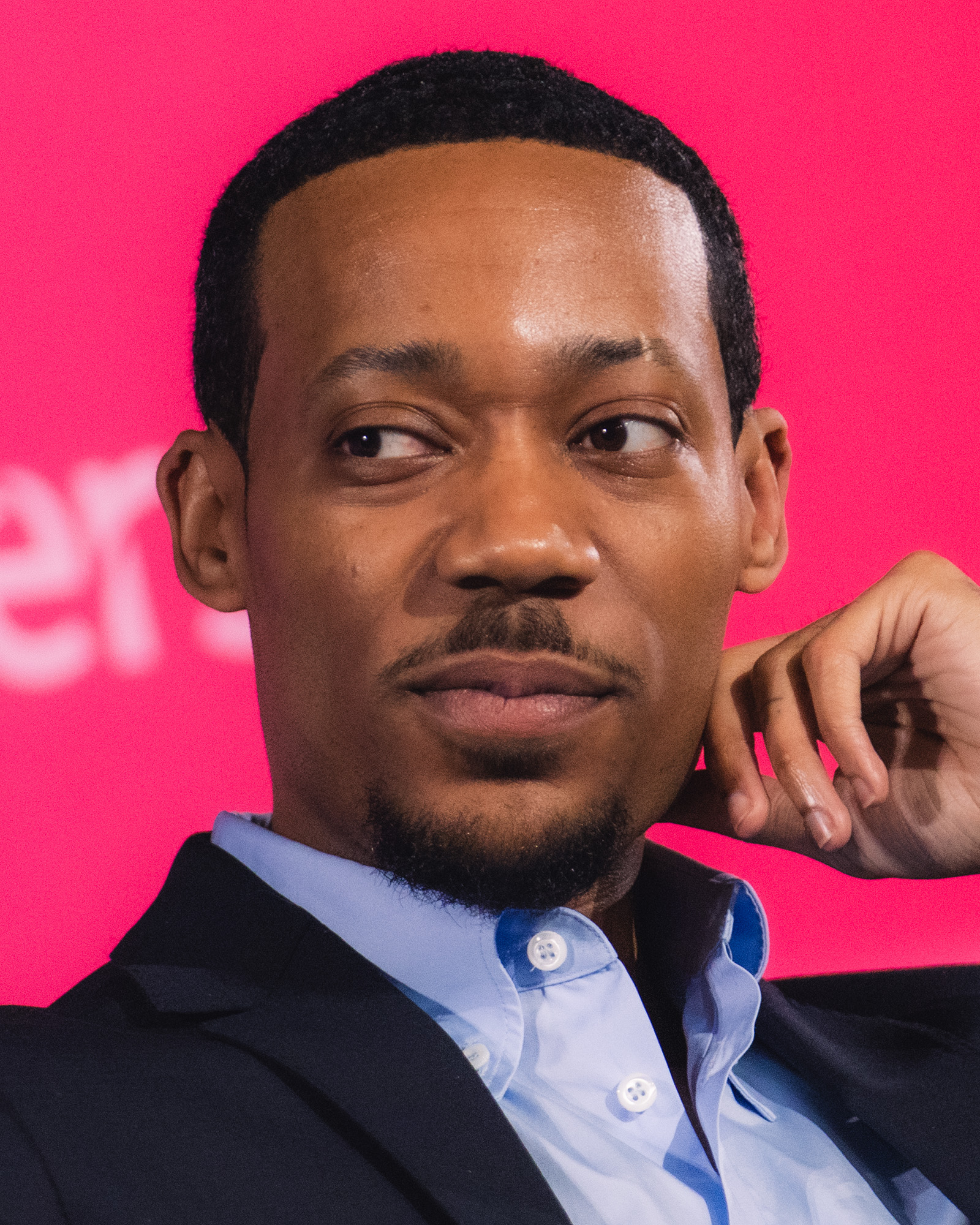
Tyler James Williams won for Abbott Elementary (2021).

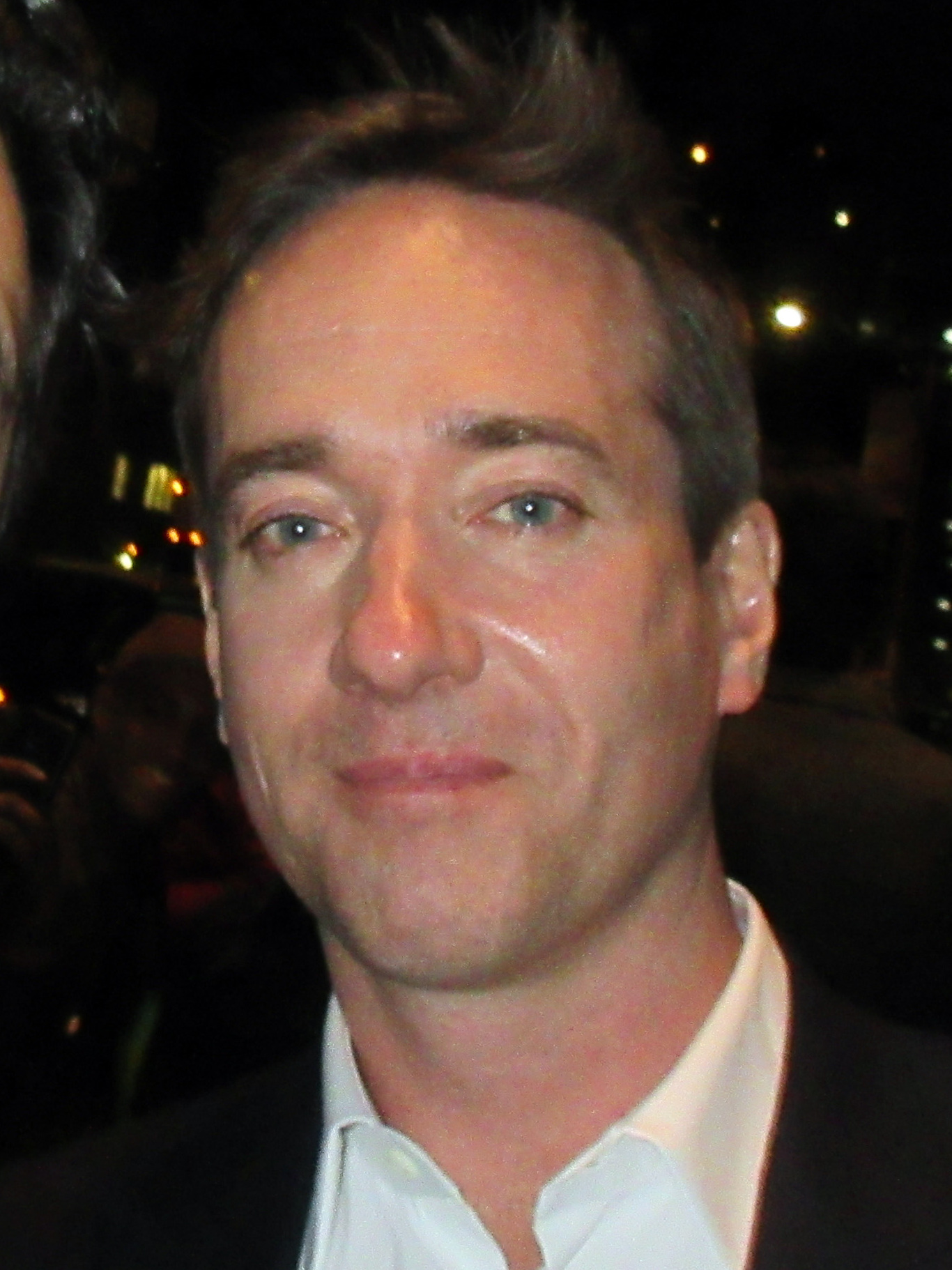
Matthew Macfadyen won for Succession (2023).

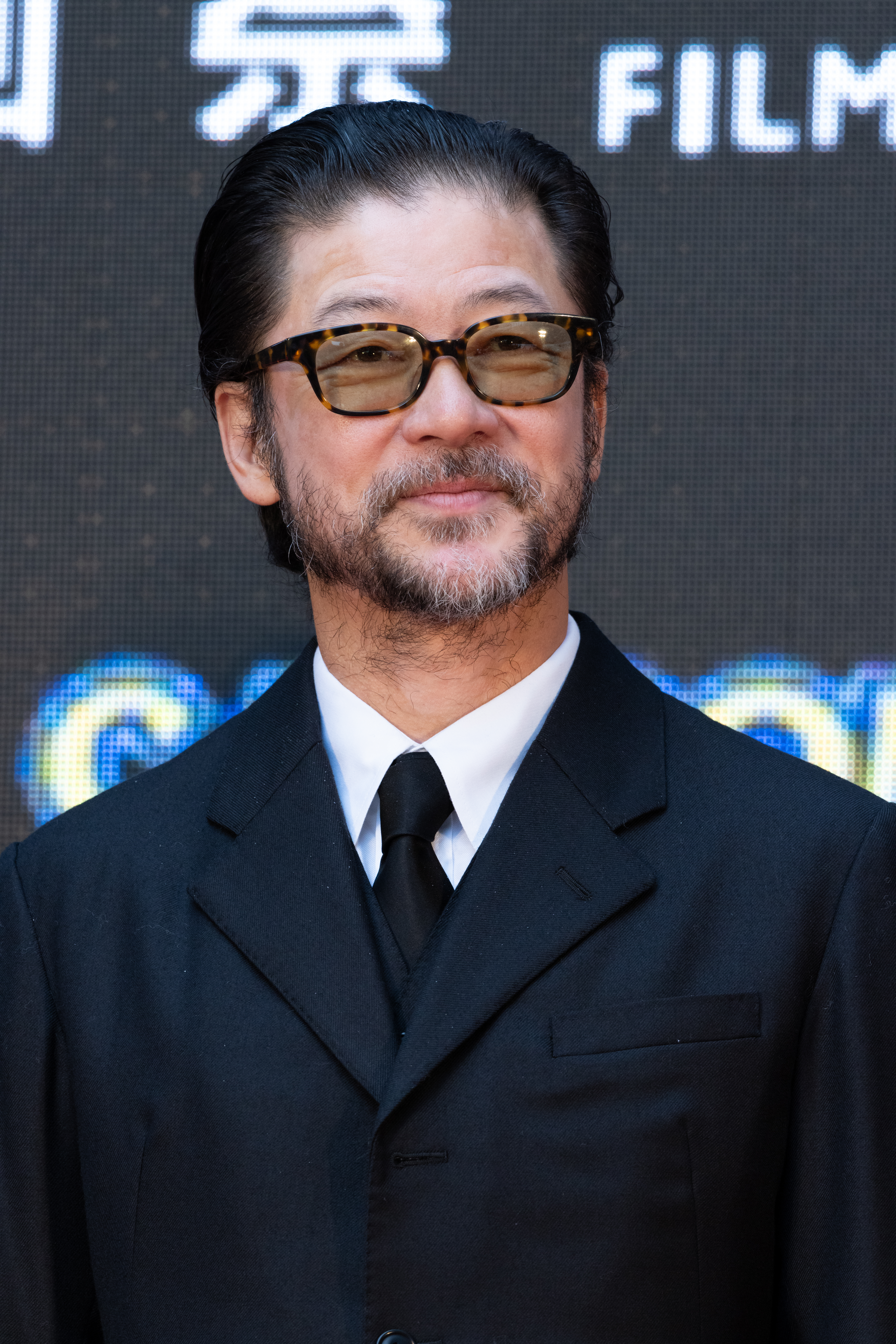
Asano Tadanobu won for Shogun (2024).

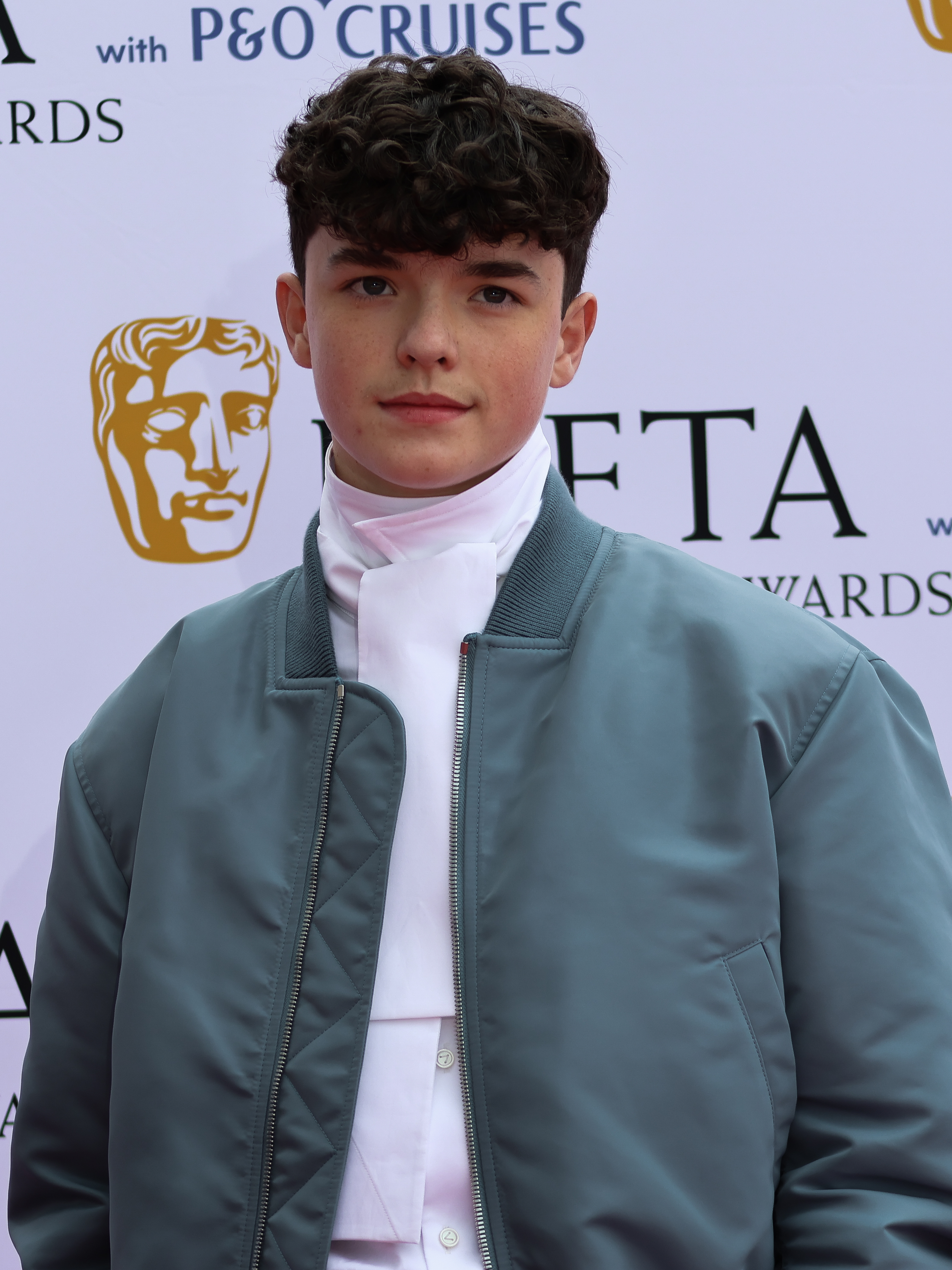
Owen Cooper won for Adolescence (2025).

Listed below are the winners of the award for each year, as well as the other nominees:

Key	Meaning
‡	Indicates the winning actor

=== 1970s ===
Year	Actor	Role	Program	Network	Ref
1970 (28th)
1970 (28th)	James Brolin ‡	Dr. Steven Kiley	Marcus Welby, M.D.	ABC	
1970 (28th)	Tige Andrews	Captain Adam Greer	The Mod Squad	ABC	
1970 (28th)	Michael Constantine	Seymour Kaufman	Room 222	ABC	
1970 (28th)	Henry Gibson	Various Characters	Rowan & Martin's Laugh-In	NBC	
1970 (28th)	Zalman King	Aaron Silverman	The Young Lawyers	ABC	
1971 (29th)
1971 (29th)	Ed Asner ‡	Lou Grant	The Mary Tyler Moore Show	CBS	
1971 (29th)	James Brolin	Dr. Steven Kiley	Marcus Welby, M.D.	ABC	
1971 (29th)	Harvey Korman	Various Characters	The Carol Burnett Show	CBS	
1971 (29th)	Rob Reiner	Michael Stivic	All in the Family	CBS	
1971 (29th)	Milburn Stone	Dr. Galen "Doc" Adams	Gunsmoke	CBS	
1972 (30th)
1972 (30th)	James Brolin ‡	Dr. Steven Kiley	Marcus Welby, M.D.	ABC	
1972 (30th)	Ed Asner	Lou Grant	The Mary Tyler Moore Show	CBS	
1972 (30th)	Ted Knight	Ted Baxter	The Mary Tyler Moore Show	CBS	
1972 (30th)	Harvey Korman	Various Characters	The Carol Burnett Show	CBS	
1972 (30th)	Rob Reiner	Michael Stivic	All in the Family	CBS	
1973 (31st)
1973 (31st)	McLean Stevenson ‡	Lt. Col. Henry Braymore Blake, M.D.	M*A*S*H	CBS	
1973 (31st)	Ed Asner	Lou Grant	The Mary Tyler Moore Show	CBS	
1973 (31st)	Will Geer	Zebulon Walton	The Waltons	CBS	
1973 (31st)	Harvey Korman	Various Characters	The Carol Burnett Show	CBS	
1973 (31st)	Strother Martin	R.J. Hawkins	Hawkins	CBS	
1973 (31st)	Rob Reiner	Michael Stivic	All in the Family	CBS	
1974 (32nd)
1974 (32nd)	Harvey Korman ‡	Various Characters	The Carol Burnett Show	CBS	
1974 (32nd)	Will Geer	Zebulon	The Waltons	CBS	
1974 (32nd)	Gavin McLeod	Murray Slaughter	The Mary Tyler Moore Show	CBS	
1974 (32nd)	Whitman Mayo	Grady Wilson	Sanford and Son	NBC	
1974 (32nd)	Jimmie Walker	James "J.J." Evans, Jr.	Good Times	CBS	
1975 (33rd)
1975 (33rd)	Ed Asner ‡	Lou Grant	The Mary Tyler Moore Show	CBS	
1975 (33rd)	Tim Conway ‡	Various Characters	The Carol Burnett Show	CBS	
1975 (33rd)	Ted Knight	Ted Baxter	The Mary Tyler Moore Show	CBS	
1975 (33rd)	Rob Reiner	Michael Stivic	All in the Family	CBS	
1975 (33rd)	Jimmie Walker	James "J.J." Evans, Jr.	Good Times	CBS	
1976 (34th)
1976 (34th)	Ed Asner ‡	Axel Jordache	Rich Man, Poor Man	ABC	
1976 (34th)	Tim Conway	Various Characters	The Carol Burnett Show	CBS	
1976 (34th)	Charles Durning	Ed Healey	Captains and the Kings	NBC	
1976 (34th)	Gavin McLeod	Murray Slaughter	The Mary Tyler Moore Show	CBS	
1976 (34th)	Rob Reiner	Michael Stivic	All in the Family	CBS	
1977 (35th)
1977 (35th)	No Award				
1978 (36th)
1978 (36th)	Norman Fell ‡	Stanley Roper	Three's Company	ABC	
1978 (36th)	Jeff Conaway	Bobby Wheeler	Taxi	ABC	
1978 (36th)	Danny DeVito	Louie De Palma	Taxi	ABC	
1978 (36th)	Pat Harrington Jr.	Dwayne Schneider	One Day at a Time	CBS	
1978 (36th)	Andy Kaufman	Latka Gravas	Taxi	ABC	
1979 (37th)
1979 (37th)	Danny DeVito ‡	Louie De Palma	Taxi	ABC	
1979 (37th)	Vic Tayback ‡	Mel Sharples	Alice	CBS	
1979 (37th)	Jeff Conaway	Bobby Wheeler	Taxi	ABC	
1979 (37th)	Tony Danza	Anthony "Tony" Banta	Taxi	ABC	
1979 (37th)	David Doyle	John Bosley	Charlie's Angels	ABC	

=== 1980s ===
Year	Actor	Role	Program	Network	Ref
1980 (38th)
1980 (38th)	Pat Harrington Jr. ‡	Dwayne Schneider	One Day at a Time	CBS	
1980 (38th)	Vic Tayback ‡	Mel Sharples	Alice	CBS	
1980 (38th)	Danny DeVito	Louie De Palma	Taxi	ABC	
1980 (38th)	Andy Kaufman	Latka Gravas	Taxi	ABC	
1980 (38th)	Geoffrey Lewis	Earl Tucker	Flo	CBS	
1981 (39th)
1981 (39th)	John Hillerman ‡	Jonathan Higgins	Magnum, P.I.	CBS	
1981 (39th)	Danny DeVito	Louie De Palma	Taxi	ABC	
1981 (39th)	Pat Harrington Jr.	Dwayne Schneider	One Day at a Time	NBC	
1981 (39th)	Vic Tayback	Mel Sharples	Alice	CBS	
1981 (39th)	Hervé Villechaize	Tattoo	Fantasy Island	ABC	
1982 (40th)
1982 (40th)	Lionel Stander ‡	Max	Hart to Hart	ABC	
1982 (40th)	Pat Harrington Jr.	Dwayne Schneider	One Day at a Time	CBS	
1982 (40th)	John Hillerman	Jonathan Higgins	Magnum, P.I.	CBS	
1982 (40th)	Lorenzo Lamas	Lance Cumson	Falcon Crest	CBS	
1982 (40th)	Anson Williams	Potsie Weber	Happy Days	ABC	
1983 (41st)
1983 (41st)	Richard Kiley ‡	Paddy Cleary	The Thorn Birds	ABC	
1983 (41st)	Bryan Brown	Luke O'Neill	The Thorn Birds	ABC	
1983 (41st)	John Houseman	Aaron Jastrow	The Winds of War	ABC	
1983 (41st)	Perry King	Yank	The Hasty Heart	Showtime	
1983 (41st)	Rob Lowe	Sam Alden	Thursday's Child	HBO	
1983 (41st)	Jan-Michael Vincent	Byron "Briny" Henry	The Winds of War	ABC	
1984 (42nd)
1984 (42nd)	Paul LeMat ‡	James "Mickey" Hughes	The Burning Bed	NBC	
1984 (42nd)	Pierce Brosnan	Robert Gould Shaw	Nancy Astor	PBS	
1984 (42nd)	John Hillerman	Jonathan Higgins	Magnum, P.I.	CBS	
1984 (42nd)	Ben Vereen	Roscoe Haines	Ellis Island	CBS	
1984 (42nd)	Bruce Weitz	Sgt. Michael "Mick" Belker	Hill Street Blues	NBC	
1985 (43rd)
1985 (43rd)	Edward James Olmos ‡	Lt. Martin Castillo	Miami Vice	NBC	
1985 (43rd)	Ed Begley Jr.	Dr. Victor Ehrlich	St. Elsewhere	NBC	
1985 (43rd)	David Carradine	Justin LaMotte	North and South	ABC	
1985 (43rd)	Richard Farnsworth	Jude Grand Pettitt	Chase	CBS	
1985 (43rd)	John James	Jeff Colby	Dynasty	ABC	
1985 (43rd)	John Malkovich	Biff Loman	Death of a Salesman	CBS	
1985 (43rd)	Pat Morita	Tommy Tanaka	Amos	CBS	
1985 (43rd)	Bruce Weitz	Sgt. Michael "Mick" Belker	Hill Street Blues	NBC	
1986 (44th)
1986 (44th)	Jan Niklas ‡	Prince Erich	Anastasia: The Mystery of Anna	NBC	
1986 (44th)	Tom Conti	Serge Klarsfeld	Nazi Hunter: The Beate Klarsfeld Story	ABC	
1986 (44th)	John Hillerman	Jonathan Higgins	Magnum, P.I.	CBS	
1986 (44th)	Trevor Howard	Maitland	Christmas Eve	NBC	
1986 (44th)	Ron Leibman	Morris Huffner	Christmas Eve	NBC	
1987 (45th)
1987 (45th)	Rutger Hauer ‡	Lieutenant Aleksandr 'Sasha' Pechersky	Escape from Sobibor	CBS	
1987 (45th)	Kirk Cameron	Mike Seaver	Growing Pains	ABC	
1987 (45th)	Dabney Coleman	Martin Costigan	Sworn to Silence	ABC	
1987 (45th)	John Hillerman	Jonathan Higgins	Magnum, P.I.	CBS	
1987 (45th)	John Larroquette	Dan Fielding	Night Court	NBC	
1987 (45th)	Brian McNamara	Dean Karney	Billionaire Boys Club	NBC	
1987 (45th)	Alan Rachins	Douglas Brackman	L.A. Law	NBC	
1987 (45th)	Gordon Thomson	Adam Carrington	Dynasty		
1988 (46th)
1988 (46th)	Barry Bostwick ‡	Col. Gen. Franz Halder	War and Remembrance	ABC	
1988 (46th)	John Gielgud ‡	Aaron Jastrow	War and Remembrance	ABC	
1988 (46th)	Armand Assante	Richard Mansfield	Jack the Ripper	CBS	
1988 (46th)	Kirk Cameron	Mike Seaver	Growing Pains	ABC	
1988 (46th)	Larry Drake	Benny Stulwicz	L.A. Law	NBC	
1988 (46th)	Derek Jacobi	The Impostor	The Tenth Man	CBS	
1988 (46th)	Edward James Olmos	Lt. Martin Castillo	Miami Vice	NBC	
1989 (47th)
1989 (47th)	Dean Stockwell ‡	Al Calavicci	Quantum Leap	NBC	
1989 (47th)	Chris Burke	Charles "Corky" Thatcher	Life Goes On	ABC	
1989 (47th)	Larry Drake	Benny Stulwicz	L.A. Law	NBC	
1989 (47th)	Tommy Lee Jones	Captain Woodrow F. Call	Lonesome Dove	CBS	
1989 (47th)	Michael Tucker	Stuart Markowitz	L.A. Law	NBC	

=== 1990s ===
Year	Actor	Role	Program	Network	Ref
1990 (48th)
1990 (48th)	Charles Durning ‡	John F. Fitzgerald	The Kennedys of Massachusetts	ABC	
1990 (48th)	Barry Miller	Pete "Briggs" Brigman	Equal Justice	ABC	
1990 (48th)	Jimmy Smits	Victor Sifuentes	L.A. Law	NBC	
1990 (48th)	Dean Stockwell	Al Calavicci	Quantum Leap	NBC	
1990 (48th)	Blair Underwood	Jonathan Rollins	L.A. Law	NBC	
1991 (49th)
1991 (49th)	Louis Gossett Jr. ‡	Sidney Williams	The Josephine Baker Story	HBO	
1991 (49th)	Larry Drake	Benny Stulwicz	L.A. Law	NBC	
1991 (49th)	Michael Jeter	Herman Stiles	Evening Shade	CBS	
1991 (49th)	Richard Kiley	Chief Justice of the United States Earl Warren	Separate but Equal	ABC	
1991 (49th)	Dean Stockwell	Al Calavicci	Quantum Leap	NBC	
1992 (50th)
1992 (50th)	Maximilian Schell ‡	Vladimir Lenin	Stalin	HBO	
1992 (50th)	Jason Alexander	George Costanza	Seinfeld	NBC	
1992 (50th)	John Corbett	Chris Stevens	Northern Exposure	CBS	
1992 (50th)	Hume Cronyn	Ben	Broadway Bound	ABC	
1992 (50th)	Earl Holliman	Darden Towe	Delta	ABC	
1992 (50th)	Dean Stockwell	Al Calavicci	Quantum Leap	NBC	
1993 (51st)
1993 (51st)	Beau Bridges ‡	Terry Harper	The Positively True Adventures of the Alleged Texas Cheerleader-Murdering Mom	HBO	
1993 (51st)	Jason Alexander	George Costanza	Seinfeld	NBC	
1993 (51st)	Dennis Franz	Andy Sipowicz	NYPD Blue	ABC	
1993 (51st)	John Mahoney	Martin Crane	Frasier	NBC	
1993 (51st)	Jonathan Pryce	Henry Kravis	Barbarians at the Gate	HBO	
1994 (52nd)
1994 (52nd)	Edward James Olmos ‡	Wilson Pinheiro	The Burning Season	HBO	
1994 (52nd)	Jason Alexander	George Costanza	Seinfeld	NBC	
1994 (52nd)	Fyvush Finkel	Douglas Wambaugh	Picket Fences	CBS	
1994 (52nd)	John Malkovich	Colonel Kurtz	Heart of Darkness	TNT	
1994 (52nd)	David Hyde Pierce	Dr. Niles Crane	Frasier	NBC	
1995 (53rd)
1995 (53rd)	Donald Sutherland ‡	Mikhail Fetisov	Citizen X	HBO	
1995 (53rd)	Sam Elliott	Wild Bill Hickok	Buffalo Girls	CBS	
1995 (53rd)	Tom Hulce	Peter Patrone	The Heidi Chronicles	TNT	
1995 (53rd)	David Hyde Pierce	Dr. Niles Crane	Frasier	NBC	
1995 (53rd)	Henry Thomas	Ray Buckey	Indictment: The McMartin Trial	HBO	
1996 (54th)
1996 (54th)	Ian McKellen ‡	Tsar Nicholas II	Rasputin: Dark Servant of Destiny	HBO	
1996 (54th)	David Paymer	David T. Wilentz	Crime of the Century	HBO	
1996 (54th)	David Hyde Pierce	Dr. Niles Crane	Frasier	NBC	
1996 (54th)	Anthony Quinn	Aniello Dellacroce	Gotti	HBO	
1996 (54th)	Noah Wyle	Dr. John Carter	ER	NBC	
1997 (55th)
1997 (55th)	George C. Scott ‡	Juror #3	12 Angry Men	Showtime	
1997 (55th)	Jason Alexander	George Costanza	Seinfeld	NBC	
1997 (55th)	Michael Caine	F. W. de Klerk	Mandela and de Klerk	Showtime	
1997 (55th)	David Hyde Pierce	Dr. Niles Crane	Frasier	NBC	
1997 (55th)	Eriq La Salle	Dr. Peter Benton	ER	NBC	
1997 (55th)	Noah Wyle	Dr. John Carter	ER	NBC	
1998 (56th)
1998 (56th)	Don Cheadle ‡	Sammy Davis Jr.	The Rat Pack	HBO	
1998 (56th)	Gregory Peck ‡	Father Mapple	Moby Dick	USA	
1998 (56th)	Joe Mantegna	Dean Martin	The Rat Pack	HBO	
1998 (56th)	David Spade	Dennis Finch	Just Shoot Me!	NBC	
1998 (56th)	Noah Wyle	Dr. John Carter	ER	NBC	
1999 (57th)
1999 (57th)	Peter Fonda ‡	Frank O'Connor	The Passion of Ayn Rand	Showtime	
1999 (57th)	Klaus Maria Brandauer	Otto Preminger	Introducing Dorothy Dandridge	HBO	
1999 (57th)	Sean Hayes	Jack McFarland	Will & Grace	NBC	
1999 (57th)	Chris Noth	Mr. Big	Sex and the City	HBO	
1999 (57th)	Peter O'Toole	Pierre Cauchon	Joan of Arc	CBS	
1999 (57th)	David Spade	Dennis Finch	Just Shoot Me!	NBC	

=== 2000s ===
Year	Actor	Role	Program	Network	Ref
2000 (58th)
2000 (58th)	Robert Downey Jr. ‡	Larry Paul	Ally McBeal	Fox	
2000 (58th)	Sean Hayes	Jack McFarland	Will & Grace	NBC	
2000 (58th)	John Mahoney	Martin Crane	Frasier	NBC	
2000 (58th)	David Hyde Pierce	Dr. Niles Crane	Frasier	NBC	
2000 (58th)	Christopher Plummer	F. Lee Bailey	American Tragedy	CBS	
2000 (58th)	Bradley Whitford	Josh Lyman	The West Wing	NBC	
2001 (59th)
2001 (59th)	Stanley Tucci ‡	Adolf Eichmann	Conspiracy	HBO	
2001 (59th)	John Corbett	Aidan Shaw	Sex and the City	HBO	
2001 (59th)	Sean Hayes	Jack McFarland	Will & Grace	NBC	
2001 (59th)	Ron Livingston	Lewis Nixon	Band of Brothers	HBO	
2001 (59th)	Bradley Whitford	Josh Lyman	The West Wing	NBC	
2002 (60th)
2002 (60th)	Donald Sutherland ‡	Clark M. Clifford	Path to War	HBO	
2002 (60th)	Alec Baldwin	Robert McNamara	Path to War	HBO	
2002 (60th)	Jim Broadbent	Desmond Morton	The Gathering Storm	HBO	
2002 (60th)	Bryan Cranston	Hal Wilkerson	Malcolm in the Middle	Fox	
2002 (60th)	Sean Hayes	Jack McFarland	Will & Grace	NBC	
2002 (60th)	Dennis Haysbert	President David Palmer	24	Fox	
2002 (60th)	Michael Imperioli	Christopher Moltisanti	The Sopranos	HBO	
2002 (60th)	John Spencer	Leo McGarry	The West Wing	NBC	
2002 (60th)	Bradley Whitford	Josh Lyman	The West Wing	NBC	
2003 (61st)
2003 (61st)	Jeffrey Wright ‡	Mr. Lies / Norman "Belize" Arriaga / Homeless Man / The Angel Europa / The Antarctic Eskimo	Angels in America	HBO	
2003 (61st)	Sean Hayes	Jack McFarland	Will & Grace	NBC	
2003 (61st)	Lee Pace	Calpernia Addams	Soldier's Girl	Showtime	
2003 (61st)	Ben Shenkman	Louis Ironson / The Angel Oceania	Angels in America	HBO	
2003 (61st)	Patrick Wilson	Joe Pitt	Angels in America	HBO	
2004 (62nd)
2004 (62nd)	William Shatner ‡	Denny Crane	Boston Legal	ABC	
2004 (62nd)	Sean Hayes	Jack McFarland	Will & Grace	NBC	
2004 (62nd)	Michael Imperioli	Christopher Moltisanti	The Sopranos	HBO	
2004 (62nd)	Jeremy Piven	Ari Gold	Entourage	HBO	
2004 (62nd)	Oliver Platt	Russell Tupper	Huff	Showtime	
2005 (63rd)
2005 (63rd)	Paul Newman ‡	Max Roby	Empire Falls	HBO	
2005 (63rd)	Naveen Andrews	Sayid Jarrah	Lost	ABC	
2005 (63rd)	Jeremy Piven	Ari Gold	Entourage	HBO	
2005 (63rd)	Randy Quaid	Colonel Tom Parker	Elvis	CBS	
2005 (63rd)	Donald Sutherland	Nathan Templeton	Commander in Chief	ABC	
2006 (64th)
2006 (64th)	Jeremy Irons ‡	Robert Dudley, 1st Earl of Leicester	Elizabeth I	HBO	
2006 (64th)	Thomas Haden Church	Tom Harte	Broken Trail	AMC	
2006 (64th)	Justin Kirk	Andy Botwin	Weeds	Showtime	
2006 (64th)	Masi Oka	Hiro Nakamura	Heroes	NBC	
2006 (64th)	Jeremy Piven	Ari Gold	Entourage	HBO	
2007 (65th)
2007 (65th)	Jeremy Piven ‡	Ari Gold	Entourage	HBO	
2007 (65th)	Ted Danson	Arthur Frobisher	Damages	FX	
2007 (65th)	Kevin Dillon	Johnny "Drama" Chase	Entourage	HBO	
2007 (65th)	Andy Serkis	Ian Brady	Longford	HBO	
2007 (65th)	William Shatner	Denny Crane	Boston Legal	ABC	
2007 (65th)	Donald Sutherland	Patrick "Tripp" Darling III	Dirty Sexy Money	ABC	
2008 (66th)
2008 (66th)	Tom Wilkinson ‡	Benjamin Franklin	John Adams	HBO	
2008 (66th)	Neil Patrick Harris	Barney Stinson	How I Met Your Mother	CBS	
2008 (66th)	Denis Leary	Michael Whouley	Recount	HBO	
2008 (66th)	Jeremy Piven	Ari Gold	Entourage	HBO	
2008 (66th)	Blair Underwood	Alex Prince, Jr.	In Treatment	HBO	
2009 (67th)
2009 (67th)	John Lithgow ‡	Arthur Mitchell	Dexter	Showtime	
2009 (67th)	Michael Emerson	Ben Linus	Lost	ABC	
2009 (67th)	Neil Patrick Harris	Barney Stinson	How I Met Your Mother	CBS	
2009 (67th)	William Hurt	Daniel Purcell	Damages	FX	
2009 (67th)	Jeremy Piven	Ari Gold	Entourage	HBO	

=== 2010s ===
Year	Actor	Role	Program	Network	Ref
2010 (68th)
2010 (68th)	Chris Colfer ‡	Kurt Hummel	Glee	Fox	
2010 (68th)	Scott Caan	Danny Williams	Hawaii Five-0	CBS	
2010 (68th)	Chris Noth	Peter Florrick	The Good Wife	CBS	
2010 (68th)	Eric Stonestreet	Cameron Tucker	Modern Family	ABC	
2010 (68th)	David Strathairn	Dr. Carlock	Temple Grandin	HBO	
2011 (69th)
2011 (69th)	Peter Dinklage ‡	Tyrion Lannister	Game of Thrones	HBO	
2011 (69th)	Paul Giamatti	Ben Bernanke	Too Big to Fail	HBO	
2011 (69th)	Guy Pearce	Monty Beragon	Mildred Pierce	HBO	
2011 (69th)	Tim Robbins	Bill Loud	Cinema Verite	HBO	
2011 (69th)	Eric Stonestreet	Cameron Tucker	Modern Family	ABC	
2012 (70th)
2012 (70th)	Ed Harris ‡	John McCain	Game Change	HBO	
2012 (70th)	Max Greenfield	Schmidt	New Girl	Fox	
2012 (70th)	Danny Huston	Ben "The Butcher" Diamond	Magic City	Starz	
2012 (70th)	Mandy Patinkin	Saul Berenson	Homeland	Showtime	
2012 (70th)	Eric Stonestreet	Cameron Tucker	Modern Family	ABC	
2013 (71st)
2013 (71st)	Jon Voight ‡	Mickey Donovan	Ray Donovan	Showtime	
2013 (71st)	Josh Charles	Will Gardner	The Good Wife	CBS	
2013 (71st)	Rob Lowe	Dr. Jack Startz	Behind the Candelabra	HBO	
2013 (71st)	Aaron Paul	Jesse Pinkman	Breaking Bad	AMC	
2013 (71st)	Corey Stoll	Peter Russo	House of Cards	Netflix	
2014 (72nd)
2014 (72nd)	Matt Bomer ‡	Felix Turner	The Normal Heart	HBO	
2014 (72nd)	Alan Cumming	Eli Gold	The Good Wife	CBS	
2014 (72nd)	Colin Hanks	Officer Gus Grimly	Fargo	FX	
2014 (72nd)	Bill Murray	Jack Kennison	Olive Kitteridge	HBO	
2014 (72nd)	Jon Voight	Mickey Donovan	Ray Donovan	Showtime	
2015 (73rd)
2015 (73rd)	Christian Slater ‡	Mr. Robot / Edward Alderson	Mr. Robot	USA	
2015 (73rd)	Alan Cumming	Eli Gold	The Good Wife	CBS	
2015 (73rd)	Damian Lewis	Henry VIII	Wolf Hall	PBS	
2015 (73rd)	Ben Mendelsohn	Danny Rayburn	Bloodline	Netflix	
2015 (73rd)	Tobias Menzies	Frank Randall / Jonathan "Black Jack" Randall	Outlander	Starz	
2016 (74th)
2016 (74th)	Hugh Laurie ‡	Richard Onslow Roper	The Night Manager	AMC	
2016 (74th)	Sterling K. Brown	Christopher Darden	The People v. O. J. Simpson: American Crime Story	FX	
2016 (74th)	John Lithgow	Winston Churchill	The Crown	Netflix	
2016 (74th)	Christian Slater	Mr. Robot / Edward Alderson	Mr. Robot	USA	
2016 (74th)	John Travolta	Robert Shapiro	The People v. O. J. Simpson: American Crime Story	FX	
2017 (75th)
2017 (75th)	Alexander Skarsgård ‡	Perry Wright	Big Little Lies	HBO	
2017 (75th)	David Harbour	Jim Hopper	Stranger Things	Netflix	
2017 (75th)	Alfred Molina	Robert Aldrich	Feud: Bette and Joan	FX	
2017 (75th)	Christian Slater	Mr. Robot / Edward Alderson	Mr. Robot	USA	
2017 (75th)	David Thewlis	V. M. Varga	Fargo	FX	
2018 (76th)
2018 (76th)	Ben Whishaw ‡	Norman Josiffe / Norman Scott	A Very English Scandal	Amazon	
2018 (76th)	Alan Arkin	Norman Newlander	The Kominsky Method	Netflix	
2018 (76th)	Kieran Culkin	Roman Roy	Succession	HBO	
2018 (76th)	Édgar Ramírez	Gianni Versace	The Assassination of Gianni Versace: American Crime Story	FX	
2018 (76th)	Henry Winkler	Gene Cousineau	Barry	HBO	
2019 (77th)
2019 (77th)	Stellan Skarsgård ‡	Boris Shcherbina	Chernobyl	HBO	
2019 (77th)	Alan Arkin	Norman Newlander	The Kominsky Method	Netflix	
2019 (77th)	Kieran Culkin	Roman Roy	Succession	HBO	
2019 (77th)	Andrew Scott	The Priest	Fleabag	Amazon	
2019 (77th)	Henry Winkler	Gene Cousineau	Barry	HBO	

=== 2020s ===
Year	Actor	Role	Program	Network	Ref
2020 (78th)
2020 (78th)	John Boyega ‡	Leroy Logan	Small Axe	Amazon Prime Video	
2020 (78th)	Brendan Gleeson	President Donald Trump	The Comey Rule	Showtime	
2020 (78th)	Daniel Levy	David Rose	Schitt's Creek	Pop TV	
2020 (78th)	Jim Parsons	Henry Willson	Hollywood	Netflix	
2020 (78th)	Donald Sutherland	Franklin Reinhardt	The Undoing	HBO	
2021 (79th)
2021 (79th)	O Yeong-su ‡	Oh Il-nam	Squid Game	Netflix	
2021 (79th)	Billy Crudup	Cory Ellison	The Morning Show	Apple TV+	
2021 (79th)	Kieran Culkin	Roman Roy	Succession	HBO	
2021 (79th)	Mark Duplass	Charlie "Chip" Black	The Morning Show	Apple TV+	
2021 (79th)	Brett Goldstein	Roy Kent	Ted Lasso	Apple TV+	
2022 (80th)	Best Supporting Actor in a Television Series – Comedy/Musical or Drama				
2022 (80th)	Tyler James Williams ‡	Gregory Eddie	Abbott Elementary	ABC	
2022 (80th)	John Lithgow	Harold Harper	The Old Man	FX	
2022 (80th)	Jonathan Pryce	Prince Philip, Duke of Edinburgh	The Crown	Netflix	
2022 (80th)	John Turturro	Irving	Severance	Apple TV+	
2022 (80th)	Henry Winkler	Gene Cousineau	Barry	HBO	
2022 (80th)	Best Supporting Actor in a Limited or Anthology Series or Television Film				
2022 (80th)	Paul Walter Hauser ‡	Larry Hall	Black Bird	Apple TV+	
2022 (80th)	F. Murray Abraham	Bert Di Grasso	The White Lotus: Sicily	HBO	
2022 (80th)	Domhnall Gleeson	Sam Fortner	The Patient	FX	
2022 (80th)	Richard Jenkins	Lionel Dahmer	Dahmer - Monster: The Jeffrey Dahmer Story	Netflix	
2022 (80th)	Seth Rogen	Rand Gauthier	Pam & Tommy	Hulu	
2023 (81st)
2023 (81st)	Matthew Macfadyen ‡	Tom Wambsgans	Succession	HBO	
2023 (81st)	Billy Crudup	Cory Ellison	The Morning Show	Apple TV+	
2023 (81st)	James Marsden	Himself	Jury Duty	Amazon Freevee	
2023 (81st)	Ebon Moss-Bachrach	Richard "Richie" Jerimovich	The Bear	FX	
2023 (81st)	Alan Ruck	Connor Roy	Succession	HBO	
2023 (81st)	Alexander Skarsgård	Lukas Matsson	Succession	HBO	
2024 (82nd)
2024 (82nd)	Tadanobu Asano ‡	Kashigi Yabushige	Shōgun	FX	
2024 (82nd)	Javier Bardem	José Menendez	Monsters: The Lyle and Erik Menendez Story	Netflix	
2024 (82nd)	Harrison Ford	Dr. Paul Rhoades	Shrinking	Apple TV+	
2024 (82nd)	Jack Lowden	River Cartwright	Slow Horses	Apple TV+	
2024 (82nd)	Diego Luna	Andy Pérez	La Máquina	Hulu	
2024 (82nd)	Ebon Moss-Bachrach	Richard "Richie" Jerimovich	The Bear	FX	
2025 (83rd)
2025 (83rd)	Owen Cooper ‡	Jamie Miller	Adolescence	Netflix	
2025 (83rd)	Billy Crudup	Cory Ellison	The Morning Show	Apple TV+	
2025 (83rd)	Tramell Tillman	Seth Milchick	Severance	Apple TV+	
2025 (83rd)	Walton Goggins	Rick Hatchett	The White Lotus	HBO	
2025 (83rd)	Jason Isaacs	Timothy Ratliff	The White Lotus	HBO	
2025 (83rd)	Ashley Walters	DI Luke Bascombe	Adolescence	Netflix	

== Superlatives ==
Superlative	Best Supporting Actor - Series, Miniseries or Television Film
Actor with most awards	Ed Asner (3)
Actor with most nominations	Sean Hayes (6), Jeremy Piven (6)
Actor with most nominations without ever winning	Sean Hayes (6)

=== Multiple wins ===
Wins	Name
3	Ed Asner
2	James Brolin
2	Edward James Olmos
2	Donald Sutherland
2	Vic Tayback

=== Multiple nominations ===
Nominations	Name
6	Sean Hayes
6	Jeremy Piven
5	Ed Asner
5	John Hillerman
5	David Hyde Pierce
5	Rob Reiner
5	Donald Sutherland
4	Jason Alexander
4	Danny DeVito
4	Pat Harrington Jr.
4	Harvey Korman
4	Dean Stockwell
3	James Brolin
3	Billy Crudup
3	Kieran Culkin
3	Larry Drake
3	John Lithgow
3	Edward James Olmos
3	Christian Slater
3	Eric Stonestreet
3	Vic Tayback
3	Bradley Whitford
3	Henry Winkler
3	Noah Wyle
2	Alan Arkin
2	Kirk Cameron
2	Jeff Conaway
2	Tim Conway
2	John Corbett
2	Alan Cumming
2	Charles Durning
2	Will Geer
2	Neil Patrick Harris
2	Michael Imperioli
2	Andy Kaufman
2	Richard Kiley
2	Ted Knight
2	Rob Lowe
2	Gavin McLeod
2	John Mahoney
2	John Malkovich
2	Ebon Moss-Bachrach
2	Chris Noth
2	Jonathan Pryce
2	William Shatner
2	Alexander Skarsgård
2	David Spade
2	Blair Underwood
2	Jon Voight
2	Jimmie Walker
2	Bruce Weitz

== See also ==
- TCA Award for Individual Achievement in Drama
- TCA Award for Individual Achievement in Comedy
- Primetime Emmy Award for Outstanding Supporting Actor in a Drama Series
- Critics' Choice Television Award for Best Supporting Actor in a Drama Series
- Primetime Emmy Award for Outstanding Supporting Actor in a Comedy Series
- Critics' Choice Television Award for Best Supporting Actor in a Comedy Series
- Critics' Choice Television Award for Best Supporting Actor in a Movie/Miniseries
- Primetime Emmy Award for Outstanding Supporting Actor in a Limited or Anthology Series or Movie
- Actor Award for Outstanding Performance by a Male Actor in a Drama Series
- Actor Award for Outstanding Performance by a Male Actor in a Comedy Series
- Actor Award for Outstanding Performance by a Male Actor in a Miniseries or Television Movie
