= 29th Primetime Emmy Awards =

1977 American television programming awards

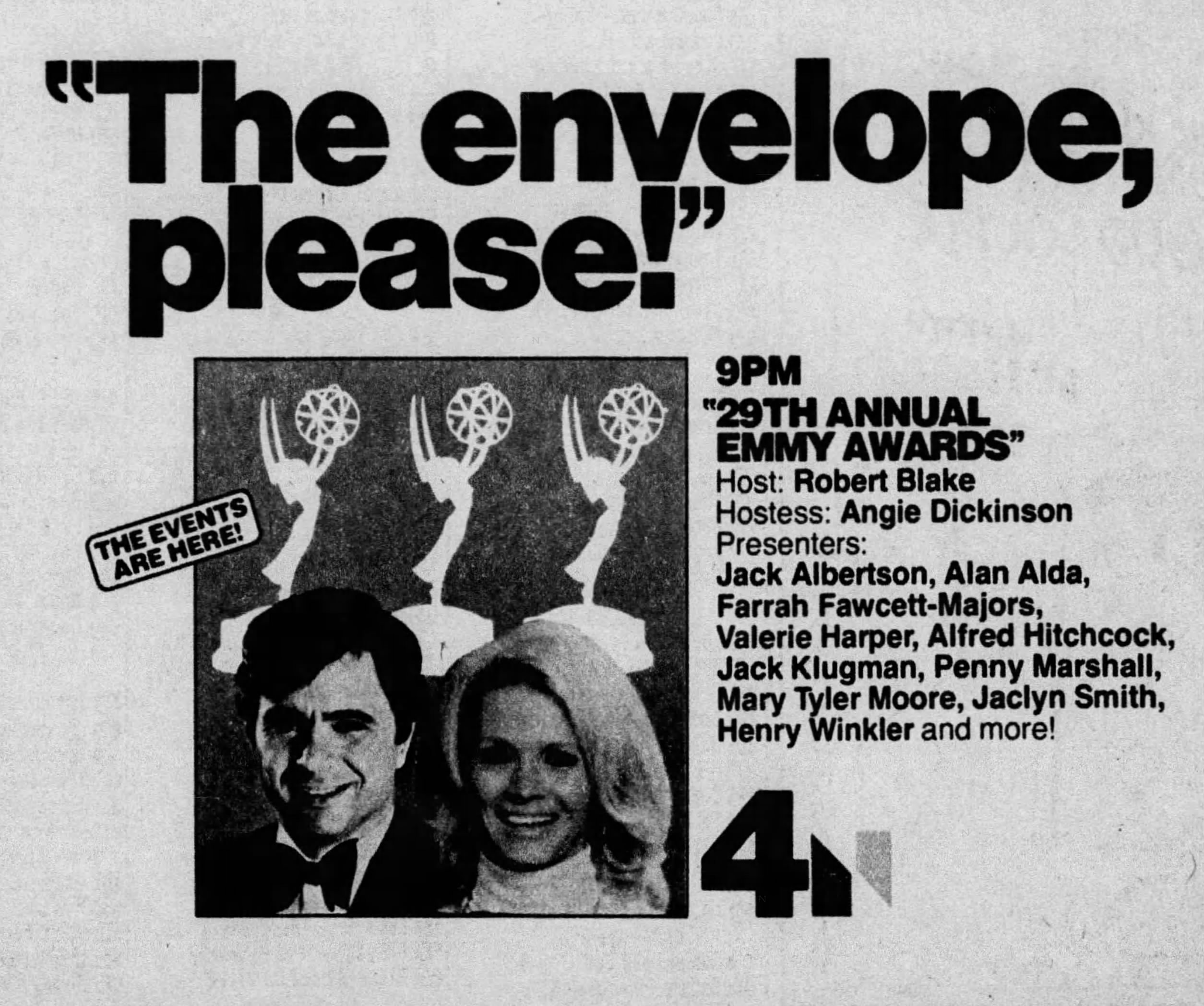
- Advertisement in the Los Angeles Times
- Date: September 11, 1977
- Location: Pasadena Civic Auditorium, Pasadena, California
- Presented by: Academy of Television Arts and Sciences
- Hosted by: Angie Dickinson; Robert Blake

Highlights
- Most awards: Roots (6)
- Most nominations: Roots (21)
- Outstanding Comedy Series: The Mary Tyler Moore Show
- Outstanding Drama Series: Upstairs, Downstairs
- Outstanding Limited Series: Roots
- Outstanding Comedy-Variety or Music Series: Van Dyke and Company
- Website: https://www.emmys.com/awards/nominees-winners/1977

Television/radio coverage
- Network: NBC

The 29th Primetime Emmy Awards were held on Sunday, September 11, 1977. The ceremony was broadcast on NBC. It was hosted by Angie Dickinson and Robert Blake. 37 awards were presented.

The top shows of the night were Mary Tyler Moore, which, in its final season, won its third consecutive Outstanding Comedy Series Award, it also became the first comedy series to gain eleven major nominations (since broken). Upstairs, Downstairs, also in its final season, won its third Outstanding Drama Series Award in four years (it competed as a miniseries in 1976, and won that category too). But the overwhelming champion of the ceremony was the miniseries Roots.

Roots set several milestones and broke multiple records during the night. It became the first show to receive at least twenty major nominations (21). Adding its nominations in Creative Arts categories, its total expands to 37. Both records still stand for all shows. It was the first show to gain every nomination in an acting category. Its thirteen acting nominations tied the record set the previous year by Rich Man, Poor Man. Roots became the first miniseries, and second show overall, along with All in the Family in 1972, to win six of seven major categories. All but one of Roots' eight episodes were nominated for major awards (Part VII).

Other distinctions included Mary Kay Place winning a Major Acting award for a TV show (Mary Hartman, Mary Hartman) that had no major network, only broadcast in Syndication - the first time this rare feat has occurred. Also, with actress Rita Moreno's win for her guest appearance on The Muppet Show, she became the third person after Richard Rodgers and Helen Hayes to achieve all four major entertainment awards (EGOT).

With this ceremony, the Primetime Emmys began a long residency at the Pasadena Civic Auditorium that would continue until 1997.

== Winners and nominees ==
=== Programs ===
Programs
Outstanding Comedy Series: The Mary Tyler Moore Show (CBS); All in the Family (CBS); Barney Miller (ABC); The Bob Newhart Show (CBS); M*A*S*H (CBS)	Outstanding Drama Series: Upstairs, Downstairs (PBS); Baretta (ABC); Columbo (NBC); Family (ABC); Police Story (NBC)
Outstanding Comedy-Variety or Music Series: Van Dyke and Company (NBC); The Carol Burnett Show (CBS); Evening at Pops (PBS); The Muppet Show (Syndicated); Saturday Night (NBC)	Outstanding Special - Comedy-Variety or Music: The Barry Manilow Special (ABC); Neil Diamond: Love at the Greek (NBC); The Shirley MacLaine Special: Where Do We Go from Here? (CBS); Sills and Burnett at the Met (CBS); World of Magic (NBC)
Outstanding Special - Drama or Comedy: Eleanor and Franklin: The White House Years (ABC); Sybil (NBC); 21 Hours at Munich (ABC); Harry S. Truman: Plain Speaking (PBS); Raid on Entebbe (NBC)	Outstanding Limited Series: Roots (ABC); The Adams Chronicles (PBS); Captains and the Kings (NBC); Madame Bovary (PBS); The Moneychangers (NBC)

=== Acting ===
==== Lead performances ====
Acting
Outstanding Lead Actor in a Comedy Series: Carroll O'Connor as Archie Bunker in All in the Family (CBS); Jack Albertson as Ed Brown in Chico and the Man (NBC); Alan Alda as Hawkeye Pierce in M*A*S*H (CBS); Hal Linden as Capt. Barney Miller in Barney Miller (ABC); Henry Winkler as Arthur "Fonzie" Fonzarelli in Happy Days (ABC)	Outstanding Lead Actress in a Comedy Series: Bea Arthur as Maude Findlay in Maude (CBS) (Episode: "Maude's Desperate Hours"); Valerie Harper as Rhoda Morgenstern in Rhoda (CBS); Mary Tyler Moore as Mary Richards in The Mary Tyler Moore Show (CBS); Suzanne Pleshette as Emily Hartley in The Bob Newhart Show (CBS); Jean Stapleton as Edith Bunker in All in the Family (CBS)
Outstanding Lead Actor in a Drama Series: James Garner as Jim Rockford in The Rockford Files (NBC) (Episode: "So Help Me God"); Robert Blake as Tony Baretta in Baretta (ABC); Peter Falk as Lt. Columbo in Columbo (NBC); Jack Klugman as Dr. Quincy in Quincy, M.E. (NBC); Karl Malden as Detective Lt. Mike Stone in The Streets of San Francisco (ABC)	Outstanding Lead Actress in a Drama Series: Lindsay Wagner as Jaime Sommers in The Bionic Woman (ABC) (Episode: "Deadly Ringer"); Angie Dickinson as Sgt. Suzanne "Pepper" Anderson in Police Woman (NBC); Kate Jackson as Sabrina Duncan in Charlie's Angels (ABC); Michael Learned as Olivia Walton in The Waltons (CBS); Sada Thompson as Kate Lawrence in Family (ABC)
Outstanding Lead Actor in a Special Program - Drama or Comedy: Ed Flanders as President Harry S. Truman in Harry S. Truman: Plain Speaking (PBS); Peter Boyle as Sen. Joseph McCarthy in Tail Gunner Joe (NBC); Peter Finch as Yitzhak Rabin in Raid on Entebbe (NBC); Edward Herrmann as President Franklin D. Roosevelt in Eleanor and Franklin: The White House Years (ABC); George C. Scott as The Beast in Beauty and the Beast (NBC)	Outstanding Lead Actress in a Special Program - Drama or Comedy: Sally Field as Sybil in Sybil (NBC); Jane Alexander as Eleanor Roosevelt in Eleanor and Franklin: The White House Years (ABC); Susan Clark as Amelia Earhart in Amelia Earhart (NBC); Julie Harris as Mary Todd Lincoln in The Last of Mrs. Lincoln (PBS); Joanne Woodward as Dr. Cornelia Wilbur in Sybil (NBC)
Outstanding Lead Actor in a Limited Series: Christopher Plummer as Roscoe Heyward in The Moneychangers (NBC); Stanley Baker as Gwilym Morgan in How Green Was My Valley (PBS); Richard Jordan as Joseph Armagh in Captains and the Kings (NBC); Steven Keats as Jay Blackman in Seventh Avenue (NBC)	Outstanding Lead Actress in a Limited Series: Patty Duke as Bernadette Hennessey Armagh in Captains and the Kings (NBC); Dori Brenner as Rhoda Gold Blackman in Seventh Avenue (NBC); Susan Flannery as Margot Bracken in The Moneychangers (NBC); Eva Marie Saint as Katherine Macahan in How the West Was Won (ABC); Jane Seymour as Marjorie Chisholm in Captains and the Kings (NBC)

==== Supporting performances ====
Outstanding Continuing Performance by a Supporting Actor in a Comedy Series: Gary Burghoff as Radar O'Reilly in M*A*S*H (CBS); Edward Asner as Lou Grant in The Mary Tyler Moore Show (CBS); Ted Knight as Ted Baxter in The Mary Tyler Moore Show (CBS); Harry Morgan as Sherman T. Potter in M*A*S*H (CBS); Abe Vigoda as Det. Phil Fish in Barney Miller (ABC)	Outstanding Continuing Performance by a Supporting Actress in a Comedy Series: Mary Kay Place as Loretta Haggers in Mary Hartman, Mary Hartman (Syndicated); Georgia Engel as Georgette Franklin in The Mary Tyler Moore Show (CBS); Julie Kavner as Brenda Morgenstern in Rhoda (CBS); Loretta Swit as Margaret Houlihan in M*A*S*H (CBS); Betty White as Sue Ann Nivens in The Mary Tyler Moore Show (CBS)
Outstanding Continuing Performance by a Supporting Actor in a Drama Series: Gary Frank as Willie Lawrence in Family (ABC) (Episode: “Lovers and Strangers”); Noah Beery Jr. as Joseph "Rocky" Rockford in The Rockford Files (NBC); David Doyle as John Bosley in Charlie's Angels (ABC); Tom Ewell as Billy Truman in Baretta (ABC); Will Geer as Zebulon Walton in The Waltons (CBS)	Outstanding Continuing Performance by a Supporting Actress in a Drama Series: Kristy McNichol as Letitia Lawrence in Family (ABC); Meredith Baxter as Nancy Lawrence Maitland in Family (ABC); Ellen Corby as Esther Walton in The Waltons (CBS); Lee Meriwether as Betty Jones in Barnaby Jones (CBS); Jacqueline Tong as Daisy in Upstairs, Downstairs (PBS)
Outstanding Performance by a Supporting Actor in a Comedy or Drama Special: Burgess Meredith as Joseph Welch in Tail Gunner Joe (NBC); Martin Balsam as Daniel Cooper in Raid on Entebbe (NBC); Mark Harmon as Robert Dunlap in Eleanor and Franklin: The White House Years (ABC); Yaphet Kotto as Idi Amin in Raid on Entebbe (NBC); Walter McGinn as Louis Howe in Eleanor and Franklin: The White House Years (ABC)	Outstanding Performance by a Supporting Actress in a Comedy or Drama Special: Diana Hyland as Mickey Lubitch in The Boy in the Plastic Bubble (ABC); Ruth Gordon as Cecilia Weiss in The Great Houdini (ABC); Rosemary Murphy as Sara Delano Roosevelt in Eleanor and Franklin: The White House Years (ABC); Patricia Neal as Sen. Margaret Chase Smith in Tail Gunner Joe (NBC); Susan Oliver as Neta Snook "Snookie" in Amelia Earhart (NBC)
Outstanding Continuing or Single Performance by a Supporting Actor in Variety or Music: Tim Conway in The Carol Burnett Show (CBS); John Belushi in Saturday Night (NBC); Chevy Chase in Saturday Night (NBC); Harvey Korman in The Carol Burnett Show (CBS); Ben Vereen in The Bell Telephone Jubilee (NBC)	Outstanding Continuing or Single Performance by a Supporting Actress in Variety or Music: Rita Moreno in The Muppet Show (Syndicated); Vicki Lawrence in The Carol Burnett Show (CBS); Gilda Radner in Saturday Night (NBC)

==== Single performances ====
Outstanding Lead Actor for a Single Appearance in a Drama or Comedy Series: Louis Gossett Jr. as Fiddler in Roots (ABC): "Part IV"; John Amos as Toby in Roots (ABC): "Part V"; LeVar Burton as Kunta Kinte in Roots (ABC): "Part I"; Ben Vereen as "Chicken" George Moore in Roots (ABC): "Part VI"	Outstanding Lead Actress for a Single Appearance in a Drama or Comedy Series: Beulah Bondi as Aunt Martha Corinne Walton in The Waltons (CBS): "The Pony Cart"; Susan Blakely as Julie Prescott in Rich Man, Poor Man Book II (ABC): "Chapter 1"; Madge Sinclair as Bell Reynolds in Roots (ABC): "Part IV"; Leslie Uggams as Kizzy Reynolds in Roots (ABC): "Part VI"; Jessica Walter as Maggie Jarris / Mrs. Reston / Mrs. McCluskey in The Streets of San Francisco (ABC): "Till Death Do Us Part"
Outstanding Single Performance by a Supporting Actor in a Comedy or Drama Series: Edward Asner as Capt. Davies in Roots (ABC): "Part I"; Charles Durning as Billy Rice in Captains and the Kings (NBC): "Chapter 2"; Moses Gunn as Kintango in Roots (ABC): "Part I"; Robert Reed as Dr. William Reynolds in Roots (ABC): "Part V"; Ralph Waite as Third Mate Slater in Roots (ABC): "Part I"	Outstanding Single Performance by a Supporting Actress in a Comedy or Drama Series: Olivia Cole as Mathilda in Roots (ABC): "Part VIII"; Sandy Duncan as Missy Anne Reynolds in Roots (ABC): "Part V"; Eileen Heckart as Flo Meredith in The Mary Tyler Moore Show (CBS): "Lou Proposes"; Cicely Tyson as Binta in Roots (ABC): "Part I"; Nancy Walker as Ida Morgenstern in Rhoda (CBS): "The Separation"

=== Directing ===
Directing
Outstanding Directing in a Comedy Series: M*A*S*H (CBS): "Dear Sigmund" – Alan Alda; All in the Family (CBS): "The Draft Dodger" – Paul Bogart; M*A*S*H (CBS): "Lt. Radar O'Reilly" – Alan Rafkin; M*A*S*H (CBS): "The Nurses" – Joan Darling; The Mary Tyler Moore Show (CBS): "The Last Show" – Jay Sandrich	Outstanding Directing in a Drama Series: Roots (ABC): "Part I" – David Greene; The Adams Chronicles (PBS): "John Quincy Adams: President" – Fred Coe; Roots (ABC): "Part II" – John Erman; Roots (ABC): "Part III" – Marvin J. Chomsky; Roots (ABC): "Part VI" – Gilbert Moses
Outstanding Directing in a Comedy-Variety or Music Series: The Carol Burnett Show (CBS): "Eydie Gormé" – Dave Powers; Saturday Night (NBC): "Paul Simon" – Dave Wilson; Van Dyke and Company (NBC): "John Denver" – John Moffitt	Outstanding Directing in a Comedy-Variety or Music Special: America Salutes Richard Rodgers: The Sound of His Music (CBS) – Dwight Hemion; The Barry Manilow Special (ABC) – Steve Binder; The Shirley MacLaine Special: Where Do We Go from Here? (CBS) – Tony Charmoli; Sills and Burnett at the Met (CBS) – Dave Powers; World of Magic (NBC) – Walter C. Miller
Outstanding Directing in a Special Program - Drama or Comedy: Eleanor and Franklin: The White House Years (ABC) – Daniel Petrie; Helter Skelter (CBS) – Tom Gries; Judge Horton and the Scottsboro Boys (NBC) – Fielder Cook; Raid on Entebbe (NBC) – Irvin Kershner; Tail Gunner Joe (NBC) – Jud Taylor

=== Writing ===
Writing
Outstanding Writing in a Comedy Series: The Mary Tyler Moore Show (CBS): "The Last Show" – James L. Brooks, Allan Burns, Ed. Weinberger, Stan Daniels, David Lloyd and Bob Ellison; Barney Miller (ABC): "Quarantine, Part 2" – Tony Sheehan and Danny Arnold; M*A*S*H (CBS): "Dear Sigmund" – Alan Alda; The Mary Tyler Moore Show (CBS): "Mary Midwife" – David Lloyd; The Mary Tyler Moore Show (CBS): "Ted's Change of Heart" – Earl Pomerantz	Outstanding Writing in a Drama Series: Roots (ABC): "Part II" – Ernest Kinoy and William Blinn; The Adams Chronicles (PBS): "Charles Francis Adams: Minister to Great Britain" – Roger O. Hirson; The Adams Chronicles (PBS): "John Quincy Adams: President" – Tad Mosel; Roots (ABC): "Part V" – James Lee; Roots (ABC): "Part VIII" – M. Charles Cohen
Outstanding Writing in a Comedy-Variety or Music Special: America Salutes Richard Rodgers: The Sound of His Music (CBS); The Barry Manilow Special (ABC); An Evening with Diana Ross (NBC); John Denver and Friend (ABC); Sills and Burnett at the Met (CBS)	Outstanding Writing in a Comedy-Variety or Music Series: Saturday Night (NBC): "Sissy Spacek"; The Carol Burnett Show (CBS): "Eydie Gormé"; The Muppet Show (Syndicated): "Paul Williams"; Saturday Night (NBC): "Elliott Gould"; Van Dyke and Company (NBC): "John Denver"
Outstanding Writing in a Special Program - Drama or Comedy - Original Teleplay: Tail Gunner Joe (NBC) – Lane Slate; The Boy in the Plastic Bubble (ABC) – Story by : Joe Morgenstern and Douglas Day Stewart Teleplay by : Douglas Day Stewart; Eleanor and Franklin: The White House Years (ABC) – James Costigan; Raid on Entebbe (NBC) – Barry Beckerman; Victory at Entebbe (ABC) – Ernest Kinoy	Outstanding Writing in a Special Program - Drama or Comedy - Adaptation: Sybil (NBC) – Stewart Stern; A Circle of Children (CBS) – Steve Gethers; Harry S. Truman: Plain Speaking (PBS) – Carol Sobieski; Judge Horton and the Scottsboro Boys (NBC) – John McGreevey; The Man in the Iron Mask (NBC) – William Bast

== Most major nominations ==
By network (Note: "Major" constitutes the categories listed above: Program, Acting, Directing, and Writing. Does not include the technical categories.)

Networks with multiple major nominations
Network	Number of Nominations
ABC	59
CBS	48
NBC	48
PBS	14

Programs with multiple major nominations
Program	Category	Network	Number of Nominations
Roots	Limited	ABC	21
The Mary Tyler Moore Show	Comedy	CBS	11
M*A*S*H	Comedy	CBS	9
Eleanor and Franklin: The White House Years	Special	ABC	8
Saturday Night	Variety	NBC	7
The Carol Burnett Show	Variety	CBS	6
Raid on Entebbe	Special	NBC	6
Captains and the Kings	Limited	NBC	5
Family	Drama	ABC	5
Tail Gunner Joe	Special	NBC	5
The Adams Chronicles	Limited	PBS	4
All in the Family	Comedy	CBS	4
Barney Miller	Comedy	ABC	4
Sybil	Special	NBC	4
The Waltons	Drama	CBS	4
Baretta	Drama	ABC	3
The Barry Manilow Special	Variety	ABC	3
Harry S. Truman: Plain Speaking	Special	PBS	3
The Moneychangers	Limited	NBC	3
The Muppet Show	Variety	Syndicated	3
Rhoda	Comedy	CBS	3
Sills and Burnett at the Met	Variety	CBS	3
Van Dyke and Company	Variety	NBC	3
Amelia Earhart	Special	NBC	2
America Salutes Richard Rodgers: The Sound of His Music	Variety	CBS	2
The Bob Newhart Show	Comedy	CBS	2
The Boy in the Plastic Bubble	Special	ABC	2
Charlie's Angels	Drama	ABC	2
Columbo	Drama	NBC	2
Judge Horton and the Scottsboro Boys	Special	NBC	2
The Rockford Files	Drama	NBC	2
Seventh Avenue	Limited	NBC	2
The Shirley MacLaine Special: Where Do We Go from Here?	Variety	CBS	2
The Streets of San Francisco	Drama	ABC	2
Upstairs, Downstairs	Drama	PBS	2
World of Magic	Variety	NBC	2

== Most major awards ==
Networks with multiple major awards
Network	Number of Awards
ABC	13
CBS	11
NBC	9
PBS	2

Programs with multiple major awards
Program	Category	Network	Number of Awards
Roots	Limited	ABC	6
Sybil	Special	NBC	3
America Salutes Richard Rodgers: The Sound of His Music	Variety	CBS	2
Eleanor and Franklin: The White House Years	Special	ABC	2
Family	Drama	ABC	2
M*A*S*H	Comedy	CBS	2
The Mary Tyler Moore Show	Comedy	CBS	2
Tail Gunner Joe	Special	NBC	2
