= 28th Primetime Emmy Awards =

1976 American television programming awards

- Date: May 17, 1976
- Location: Shubert Theatre, Los Angeles, California
- Presented by: Academy of Television Arts and Sciences
- Hosted by: John Denver; Mary Tyler Moore

Highlights
- Most awards: The Mary Tyler Moore Show (5)
- Most nominations: Rich Man, Poor Man (17)
- Outstanding Comedy Series: The Mary Tyler Moore Show
- Outstanding Drama Series: Police Story
- Outstanding Limited Series: Upstairs, Downstairs
- Outstanding Comedy-Variety or Music Series: NBC's Saturday Night

Television/radio coverage
- Network: ABC

The 28th Primetime Emmy Awards were handed out on May 17, 1976. The ceremony was hosted by John Denver and Mary Tyler Moore. 37 awards were presented. Winners are listed in bold with series' networks in parentheses.

The top show of the night was The Mary Tyler Moore Show which won its second straight Outstanding Comedy Series award, and five major awards overall. Police Story, won Outstanding Drama Series, even though it only received one major nomination.

The television miniseries Rich Man, Poor Man set numerous records. It received 17 major nominations, breaking the record held by Playhouse 90 which was set in 1959 (since broken). It also received 13 acting nominations, although some of the acting categories at this ceremony were later eliminated or combined. Despite this, it lost Outstanding Limited Series to Upstairs, Downstairs.

The Shubert Theatre had previously hosted the 1973 Emmy ceremony; it would host the ceremony a third and final time in 2001.

== Winners and nominees ==
=== Programs ===
Programs
**Outstanding Comedy Series**: **The Mary Tyler Moore Show (CBS)**; All in the Family (CBS); Barney Miller (ABC); M*A*S*H (CBS); Welcome Back, Kotter (ABC)	**Outstanding Drama Series**: **Police Story (NBC)**; Baretta (ABC); Columbo (NBC); The Streets of San Francisco (ABC)
**Outstanding Comedy-Variety or Music Series**: **Saturday Night (NBC)**; The Carol Burnett Show (CBS)	**Outstanding Special - Comedy-Variety or Music**: **Gypsy in My Soul (CBS)**; The Lily Tomlin Special (ABC); The Monty Python Show: Wide World Special (ABC); Rocky Mountain Christmas (ABC); Steve and Eydie: Our Love Is Here to Stay (CBS)
**Outstanding Special - Drama or Comedy**: **Eleanor and Franklin (ABC)**; Babe (CBS); Fear on Trial (CBS); The Lindbergh Kidnapping Case (NBC); A Moon for the Misbegotten (ABC)	**Outstanding Limited Series**: **Upstairs, Downstairs (PBS)**; The Adams Chronicles (PBS); Jennie: Lady Randolph Churchill (PBS); The Law (NBC); Rich Man, Poor Man (ABC)

=== Acting ===
==== Lead performances ====
Acting
**Outstanding Lead Actor in a Comedy Series**: **Jack Albertson as Ed Brown in Chico and the Man (NBC)**; Alan Alda as Hawkeye Pierce in M*A*S*H (CBS); Hal Linden as Capt. Barney Miller in Barney Miller (ABC); Henry Winkler as Arthur "Fonzie" Fonzarelli in Happy Days (ABC)	**Outstanding Lead Actress in a Comedy Series**: **Mary Tyler Moore as Mary Richards in The Mary Tyler Moore Show (CBS) (Episode: "Chuckles Bites the Dust")**; Bea Arthur as Maude Findlay in Maude (CBS); Lee Grant as Fay Stewart in Fay (NBC); Valerie Harper as Rhoda Morgenstern in Rhoda (CBS); Cloris Leachman as Phyllis Lindstrom in Phyllis (CBS)
**Outstanding Lead Actor in a Drama Series**: **Peter Falk as Lt. Columbo in Columbo (NBC)**; James Garner as Jim Rockford in The Rockford Files (NBC); Karl Malden as Detective Lt. Mike Stone in The Streets of San Francisco (ABC)	**Outstanding Lead Actress in a Drama Series**: **Michael Learned as Olivia Walton in The Waltons (CBS)**; Angie Dickinson as Sgt. Suzanne "Pepper" Anderson in Police Woman (NBC); Anne Meara as Kate McShane in Kate McShane (CBS); Brenda Vaccaro as Sara Yarnell in Sara (CBS)
**Outstanding Lead Actor in a Special Program - Drama or Comedy**: **Anthony Hopkins as Bruno Richard Hauptmann in The Lindbergh Kidnapping Case (NBC)**; William Devane as John Henry Faulk in Fear on Trial (CBS); Edward Herrmann as President Franklin D. Roosevelt in Eleanor and Franklin (ABC); Jack Lemmon as Archie Rice in The Entertainer (NBC); Jason Robards as James Tyrone Jr. in A Moon for the Misbegotten (ABC)	**Outstanding Lead Actress in a Special Program - Drama or Comedy**: **Susan Clark as Babe Didrikson Zaharias in Babe (CBS)**; Jane Alexander as Eleanor Roosevelt in Eleanor and Franklin (ABC); Colleen Dewhurst as Josie Hogan in A Moon for the Misbegotten (ABC); Sada Thompson as Phoebe Rice in The Entertainer (NBC)
**Outstanding Lead Actor in a Limited Series**: **Hal Holbrook as President Abraham Lincoln in Lincoln (NBC)**; George Grizzard as John Adams in The Adams Chronicles (PBS); Nick Nolte as Tom Jordache in Rich Man, Poor Man (ABC); Peter Strauss as Rudy Jordache in Rich Man, Poor Man (ABC)	**Outstanding Lead Actress in a Limited Series**: **Rosemary Harris as George Sand in Notorious Woman (PBS)**; Susan Blakely as Julie Prescott in Rich Man, Poor Man (ABC); Jean Marsh as Rose in Upstairs, Downstairs (PBS); Lee Remick as Lady Randolph Churchill in Jennie: Lady Randolph Churchill (PBS)

==== Supporting performances ====
**Outstanding Continuing Performance by a Supporting Actor in a Comedy Series**: **Ted Knight as Ted Baxter in The Mary Tyler Moore Show (CBS) (Episode: "Ted's Wedding")**; Edward Asner as Lou Grant in The Mary Tyler Moore Show (CBS); Gary Burghoff as Radar O'Reilly in M*A*S*H (CBS); Harry Morgan as Sherman T. Potter in M*A*S*H (CBS); Abe Vigoda as Det. Phil Fish in Barney Miller (ABC)	**Outstanding Continuing Performance by a Supporting Actress in a Comedy Series**: **Betty White as Sue Ann Nivens in The Mary Tyler Moore Show (CBS)**; Georgia Engel as Georgette Franklin in The Mary Tyler Moore Show (CBS); Julie Kavner as Brenda Morgenstern in Rhoda (CBS); Loretta Swit as Margaret Houlihan in M*A*S*H (CBS); Nancy Walker as Ida Morgenstern in Rhoda (CBS)
**Outstanding Continuing Performance by a Supporting Actor in a Drama Series**: **Anthony Zerbe as Lt. Trench in Harry O (ABC)**; Michael Douglas as Steve Keller in The Streets of San Francisco (ABC); Will Geer as Zebulon Walton in The Waltons (CBS); Ray Milland as Duncan Calderwood in Rich Man, Poor Man (ABC); Robert Reed as Teddy Boylan in Rich Man, Poor Man (ABC)	**Outstanding Continuing Performance by a Supporting Actress in a Drama Series**: **Ellen Corby as Esther Walton in The Waltons (CBS)**; Angela Baddeley as Mrs. Bridges in Upstairs, Downstairs (PBS); Susan Howard as Maggie Petrocelli in Petrocelli (NBC); Dorothy McGuire as Mary Jordache in Rich Man, Poor Man (ABC); Sada Thompson as Mary Todd Lincoln in Lincoln (NBC)
**Outstanding Continuing or Single Performance by a Supporting Actor in Variety or Music**: **Chevy Chase in Saturday Night (NBC)**; Tim Conway in The Carol Burnett Show (CBS); Harvey Korman in The Carol Burnett Show (CBS)	**Outstanding Continuing or Single Performance by a Supporting Actress in Variety or Music**: **Vicki Lawrence in The Carol Burnett Show (CBS)**; Cloris Leachman in Telly...Who Loves Ya, Baby? (CBS)

==== Single performances ====
**Outstanding Lead Actor for a Single Appearance in a Drama or Comedy Series**: **Edward Asner as Axel Jordache in Rich Man, Poor Man (ABC): "Chapters 1 & 2"**; Bill Bixby as Jerry Schilling in The Streets of San Francisco (ABC): "The Police Buff"; Tony Musante as Dr. Paul Brandon in Medical Story (NBC): "The Quality of Mercy"; Robert Reed as Dr. Pat Caddison in Medical Center (CBS): "The Fourth Sex"	**Outstanding Lead Actress for a Single Appearance in a Drama or Comedy Series**: **Kathryn Walker as Abigail Adams in The Adams Chronicles (PBS): "John Adams, Lawyer"**; Helen Hayes as Aunt Clara in Hawaii Five-O (CBS): "Retire In Sunny Hawaii... Forever"; Sheree North as June Monica in Marcus Welby, M.D. (ABC): "How Do You Know What Hurts Me?"; Pamela Payton-Wright as Louisa Catherine Adams in The Adams Chronicles (PBS): "John Quincy Adams, Diplomat"; Martha Raye as Agatha in McMillan & Wife (NBC): "Greed"
**Outstanding Single Performance** **by a Supporting Actor in a Comedy or Drama Special**: **Ed Flanders as Phil Hogan in A Moon for the Misbegotten (ABC)**; Ray Bolger as Billy Rice in The Entertainer (NBC); Art Carney as Thornton Alman in Katherine (ABC)	**Outstanding Single Performance** **by a Supporting Actress in a Comedy or Drama Special**: **Rosemary Murphy as Sara Delano Roosevelt in Eleanor and Franklin (ABC)**; Lois Nettleton as Nan Claybourne in Fear on Trial (CBS); Lilia Skala as Mlle. Souvestre in Eleanor and Franklin (ABC); Irene Tedrow as Mary Hall in Eleanor and Franklin (ABC)
**Outstanding Single Performance** **by a Supporting Actor in a Comedy or Drama Series**: **Gordon Jackson as Hudson in Upstairs, Downstairs (PBS): "The Beastly Hun"**; Bill Bixby as Willie Abbott in Rich Man, Poor Man (ABC): "Chapter 8"; Roscoe Lee Browne as Charlie Jeffers in Barney Miller (ABC): "The Escape Artist"; Norman Fell as Smitty in Rich Man, Poor Man (ABC): "Chapter 7"; Van Johnson as Marsh Goodwin in Rich Man, Poor Man (ABC): "Chapters 9 & 10"	**Outstanding Single Performance** **by a Supporting Actress in a Comedy or Drama Series**: **Fionnula Flanagan as Clothilde in Rich Man, Poor Man (ABC): "Chapters 3 & 4"**; Kim Darby as Virginia Calderwood in Rich Man, Poor Man (ABC): "Chapters 3 & 4"; Ruth Gordon as Carlton's Mother in Rhoda (CBS): "Kiss Your Epaulets Goodbye"; Eileen Heckart as Flo Meredith in The Mary Tyler Moore Show (CBS): "Mary's Aunt"; Kay Lenz as Kate Jordache in Rich Man, Poor Man (ABC): "Chapters 11 & 12"

=== Directing ===
Directing
**Outstanding Directing in a Comedy Series**: **M*A*S*H (CBS): "Welcome to Korea" – Gene Reynolds**; M*A*S*H (CBS): "The Kids" – Alan Alda; The Mary Tyler Moore Show (CBS): "Chuckles Bites the Dust" – Joan Darling; Maude (CBS): "The Analyst" – Hal Cooper	**Outstanding Directing in a Drama Series**: **Rich Man, Poor Man (ABC): "Episode 8" – David Greene**; Beacon Hill (CBS): "Pilot" – Fielder Cook; Jennie: Lady Randolph Churchill (PBS): "Part IV" – James Cellan Jones; Lincoln (NBC): "Crossing Fox River" – George Schaefer; Rich Man, Poor Man (ABC): "Episode 5" – Boris Sagal; Upstairs, Downstairs (PBS): "Women Shall Not Weep" – Christopher Hodson
**Outstanding Directing in a Comedy-Variety or Music Series**: **Saturday Night (NBC): "Paul Simon" – Dave Wilson**; The Carol Burnett Show (CBS): "Maggie Smith" – Dave Powers; The Sonny and Cher Show (CBS): "Premiere" – Tim Kiley	**Outstanding Directing in a Comedy-Variety or Music Special**: **Steve and Eydie: Our Love Is Here to Stay (CBS) – Dwight Hemion**; Mitzi... Roarin' in the 20's (CBS) – Tony Charmoli; Rocky Mountain Christmas (ABC) – Bill Davis
**Outstanding Directing in a Special Program - Drama or Comedy**: **Eleanor and Franklin (ABC) – Daniel Petrie**; Babe (CBS) – Buzz Kulik; Fear on Trial (CBS) – Lamont Johnson; A Moon for the Misbegotten (ABC) – José Quintero and Gordon Rigsby

=== Writing ===
Writing
**Outstanding Writing in a Comedy Series**: **The Mary Tyler Moore Show (CBS): "Chuckles Bites the Dust" – David Lloyd**; Barney Miller (ABC): "The Hero" – Danny Arnold and Chris Hayward; M*A*S*H (CBS): "Hawkeye" – Larry Gelbart and Simon Muntner; M*A*S*H (CBS): "The More I See You" – Larry Gelbart and Gene Reynolds; Maude (CBS): "The Analyst" – Jay Folb	**Outstanding Writing in a Drama Series**: **The Adams Chronicles (PBS): "John Adams, Lawyer" – Sherman Yellen**; Jennie: Lady Randolph Churchill (PBS): "Lady Randolph" – Julian Mitchell; The Law (NBC): "Complaint Amended" – Joel Oliansky; Rich Man, Poor Man (ABC): "Episode 1" – Dean Riesner; Upstairs, Downstairs (PBS): "Another Year" – Alfred Shaughnessy
**Outstanding Writing in a Comedy-Variety or Music Special**: **The Lily Tomlin Special (ABC)**; Gypsy in My Soul (CBS); Mitzi... Roarin' in the 20's (CBS); Van Dyke and Company (NBC)	**Outstanding Writing in a Comedy-Variety or Music Series**: **Saturday Night (NBC): "Elliott Gould"**; The Carol Burnett Show (CBS): "Jim Nabors"; The Sonny and Cher Show (CBS): "Premiere"
**Outstanding Writing in a Special Program - Drama or Comedy - Original Teleplay**: **Eleanor and Franklin (ABC) – James Costigan**; Babe (CBS) – Joanna Lee; I Will Fight No More Forever (ABC) – Theodore Strauss and Jeb Rosebrook; The Lindbergh Kidnapping Case (NBC) – J.P. Miller; The Night that Panicked America (ABC) – Story by : Nicholas Meyer Teleplay by : Nicholas Meyer and Anthony Wilson	**Outstanding Writing in a Special Program - Drama or Comedy - Adaptation**: **Fear on Trial (CBS) – David W. Rintels**; The Entertainer (NBC) – Elliott Baker; Farewell to Manzanar (NBC) – Jeanne Wakatsuki Houston, James D. Houston and John Korty

== Most major nominations ==
Networks with multiple major nominations (Note: "Major" constitutes the categories listed above: Program, Acting, Directing, and Writing. Does not include the technical categories.)
Network	Number of Nominations
CBS	57
ABC	49
NBC	28
PBS	16

Programs with multiple major nominations
Programs	Category	Network	Number of Nominations
Rich Man, Poor Man	Limited	ABC	17
M*A*S*H	Comedy	CBS	9
The Mary Tyler Moore Show	Comedy	CBS	9
Eleanor and Franklin	Special	ABC	8
The Carol Burnett Show	Variety	CBS	6
Upstairs, Downstairs	Limited	PBS	6
The Adams Chronicles	Limited	PBS	5
Barney Miller	Comedy	ABC	5
Fear on Trial	Special	CBS	5
A Moon for the Misbegotten	Special	ABC	5
Babe	Special	CBS	4
The Entertainer	Special	NBC	4
Jennie: Lady Randolph Churchill	Limited	PBS	4
Rhoda	Comedy	CBS	4
Saturday Night	Variety	NBC	4
The Streets of San Francisco	Drama	ABC	4
Lincoln	Special	NBC	3
Maude	Comedy	CBS	3
The Waltons	Drama	CBS	3
Columbo	Drama	NBC	2
Gypsy in My Soul	Variety	CBS	2
The Law	Limited	NBC	2
The Lily Tomlin Special	Variety	ABC	2
The Lindbergh Kidnapping Case	Special	NBC	2
Mitzi... Roarin' in the 20's	Variety	CBS	2
Rocky Mountain Christmas	Variety	ABC	2
The Sonny and Cher Show	Variety	CBS	2
Steve and Eydie: Our Love Is Here to Stay	Variety	CBS	2

== Most major awards ==
Networks with multiple major awards
Network	Number of Awards
CBS	12
ABC	10
NBC	8
PBS	5

Programs with multiple major awards
Program	Category	Network	Number of Awards
The Mary Tyler Moore Show	Comedy	CBS	5
Eleanor and Franklin	Special	CBS	4
Saturday Night	Variety	NBC	4
Rich Man, Poor Man	Limited	ABC	3
The Adams Chronicles	Limited	PBS	2
The Waltons	Drama	CBS	2
