= Chuckles Bites the Dust =

- The Mary Tyler Moore Show episode
- Episode no.: Season 6 Episode 7
- Directed by: Joan Darling
- Written by: David Lloyd
- Original air date: October 25, 1975

Episode chronology
← Previous "Mary's Aunt"	Next → "Mary's Delinquent"

"Chuckles Bites the Dust" is an episode of the television situation comedy The Mary Tyler Moore Show which first aired on October 25, 1975. The episode's plot centers on the WJM-TV staff's reaction to the absurd death of Chuckles the Clown, an often-mentioned but seldom-seen character who starred in an eponymously titled children's show at the station. Most of the WJM-TV staff cannot help making jokes about the strange death of a strange person except for Mary, who repeatedly scolds her co-workers for disrespecting the deceased. However, during Chuckles' funeral service, Mary begins to giggle uncontrollably, much to her embarrassment. The celebrant assures her that laughing is the proper response to the life of a clown.

The episode gained widespread praise and won a Primetime Emmy Award for Outstanding Writing for a Comedy Series. It has been singled out as one of the best episodes in television history for how it deals with the weighty subjects of death and grieving in a deeply "human" way.

== Plot ==
News anchor Ted Baxter is hired as the grand marshal for a circus parade, but is ordered by Lou Grant to turn down the "honor". Ted is upset and tries to rally Mary to his side. Mary agrees that Lou acted a bit hastily, but then tells Ted that Chuckles the Clown has been asked in his place and has accepted.

The next day, as Mary and Murray are watching Ted deliver the live newscast, Lou rushes into the newsroom in shock and tells the staff that Chuckles has been killed during the parade. He had dressed as the character Peter Peanut, and a rogue elephant tried to "shell" him, causing fatal injuries. During a commercial break, Lou orders Ted to adlib a eulogy for Chuckles, with disastrous results.

The next day at the studio, the unusual circumstances of Chuckles' death provoke a wave of workplace jokes, especially by Lou, Sue Ann Nivens and Murray Slaughter (e.g. "You know how hard it is to stop after just one peanut!" and "He could've gone as Billy Banana and had a gorilla peel him to death.") They dissolve into helpless laughter, except for Mary, who is appalled by her co-workers' apparent lack of respect for the deceased. They try to assure her that they mean no disrespect for Chuckles. Their reaction is simply an emotional release, a response to humankind's fear of death: "Everyone does it." Mary shames them into uncomfortable silence by answering, "I don't."

At the funeral, the jokes continue until the services are about to start, at which time a final scolding by Mary encourages her friends to become properly somber. However, Mary alone begins to giggle uncontrollably as the minister recounts Chuckles' comedy characters and comic routines. She tries to stifle her laughter, but cannot contain herself as Reverend Burns delivers the eulogy:

"Chuckles the Clown brought pleasure to millions. The characters he created will be remembered by children and adults alike: Peter Peanut; Mr. Fee-Fi-Fo; Billy Banana; and my particular favorite, Aunt Yoo-Hoo. And not just for the laughter they provided — there was always some deeper meaning to whatever Chuckles did. Do you remember Mr. Fee-Fi-Fo's little catchphrase? Remember how, when his arch-rival Señor Kaboom hit him with a giant cucumber and knocked him down, Mr. Fee-Fi-Fo would always pick himself up, dust himself off, and say 'I hurt my foo-foo'? Life's a lot like that. From time to time we all fall down and hurt our foo-foos. If only we could deal with it as simply and bravely and honestly as Mr. Fee-Fi-Fo. And what did Chuckles ask in return? Not much. In his own words, 'A little song, a little dance, a little seltzer down your pants.'"

Mary's friends, and the other attendees, are shocked by her laughter. The minister, however, asks the mortified Mary to rise, and assures her that her laughter is actually in keeping with Chuckles' life's work. "He lived to make people laugh. Tears were offensive to him; deeply offensive…So go ahead, my dear: laugh for Chuckles." Mary then bursts into helpless, heartbreaking sobs.

Back at Mary's apartment after the funeral, she and her friends discuss how they envision their funerals. Sue Ann says she just wants to be cremated and have her ashes thrown on Robert Redford; Lou says he doesn't want anyone to "make a fuss" about his death, explaining "When I go, I just wanna be stood outside in the garbage with my hat on"; and Mary says she just doesn't want "an organ playing a lot of sad music" at her funeral. Murray asks her "What do you want them to play, 'Everything's Coming Up Roses'"? Finally, Ted envisions "a nice, fancy funeral" for himself, but only if he's going to die. After being questioned about what he means by "if", Ted then explains that if he gets real sick to where he's going to die, he wants someone to "take him away and freeze him" and then in "200–300 years when they find a cure", to just un-freeze him. Mary then asks Ted to do her a favor when they freeze him – "Could you take this with you?", and takes out of her refrigerator the "food mobile" Sue Ann gave her at the beginning of the episode; everyone laughs as the credits roll.

== Background ==
Chuckles's first on-camera appearance was in the first-season episode "The Snow Must Go On". Richard Schaal portrays Chuckles when he arrives at TV station WJM the morning after a city election, to find the news staff—having lost contact with City Hall during a blizzard—still on the air. Chuckles has the election results in his newspaper, and announces the winner of the mayoral race on the air in clown character.

Chuckles had a brief non-speaking role in the third-season episode titled "Who's in Charge Here?", where he was portrayed by an uncredited extra. In this episode, Chuckles meets with Lou Grant, who has been temporarily promoted to WJM's program manager. Chuckles is seen arriving for the meeting in full clown makeup. Mark Gordon next played Chuckles in the fourth-season episode "Son of 'But, Seriously Folks'". Aside from these appearances, Chuckles, like Phyllis Lindstrom's husband Lars, existed only off-stage.

== Reception ==
In 1997, this episode was ranked No. 1 on TV Guide's "100 Greatest Episodes Of All Time". The episode was written by David Lloyd, for which he won the Emmy Award for Outstanding Writing in a Comedy Series.

Splitsider said that the episode "found a way to even make death funny, and that’s what makes it one of the most human—not to mention hilarious—episodes ever."

The funeral scene was directly parodied in the "It's the Great Pancake, Cleveland Brown" episode of The Cleveland Show.
