= Mary Richards =

Fictional character from The Mary Tyler Moore Show

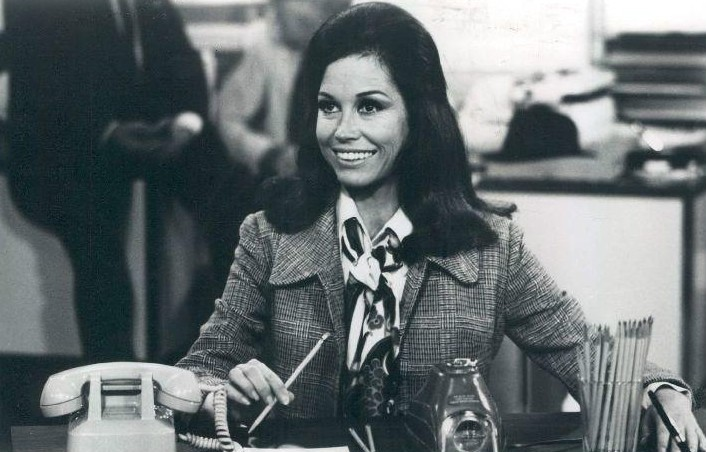
- Moore as Richards from the pilot episode in 1970
- First appearance: "Love Is All Around"; September 19, 1970
- Last appearance: Mary and Rhoda; February 7, 2000
- Created by: James L. Brooks and Allan Burns
- Portrayed by: Mary Tyler Moore

In-universe information
- Gender: Female
- Occupation: In-studio producer for ABC News; Former News producer for WJM-TV; Former Associate producer for WJM-TV
- Family: Walter Richards (father); Dottie Richards (mother); Flo Meredith (maternal aunt)
- Spouse: Steven Cronin (deceased)
- Children: Rose Cronin
- Home: Minneapolis, Minnesota

Mary Richards, portrayed by Mary Tyler Moore, is the lead character of the television sitcom The Mary Tyler Moore Show.

== Character biography ==
Mary Richards, born in April 1939 in Roseburg, Minnesota, is the only child of Walter and Dottie Richards. Prior to relocating to Minneapolis, she was engaged to a medical student named Bill whom she left after realizing he would probably never want to get married.

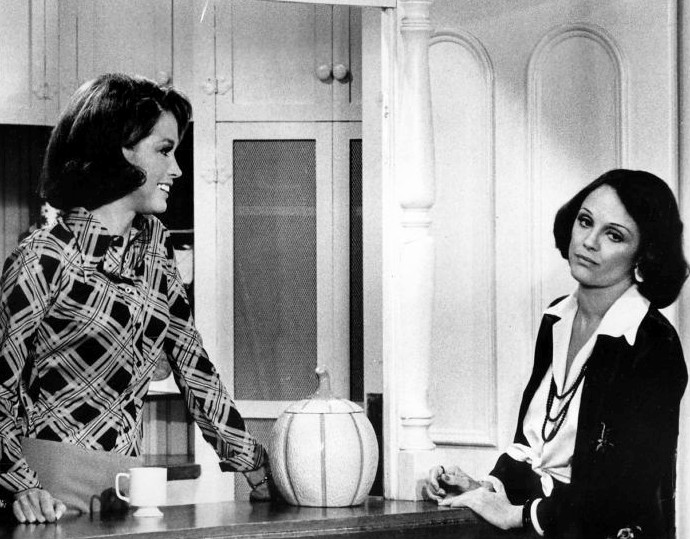
Mary and Rhoda

After arriving in Minneapolis, Mary leases an apartment in her friend, Phyllis Lindstrom's house. Also renting an attic loft from Phyllis is Rhoda Morgenstern, with whom Mary becomes fast friends. Mary also bonds with Phyllis's precocious daughter, Bess.

Mary applies for a secretarial job at television station WJM-TV, the area's lowest rated channel. After meeting with news producer Lou Grant, she learns the position has been filled but she is hired as an associate producer. Later, Mary is promoted to producer when Lou becomes the news director. While at WJM, she quickly becomes friends with newswriter Murray Slaughter and vain, incompetent anchorman Ted Baxter. In the office, Mary is often the voice of reason. Lou—always called Mr. Grant by Mary—later develops an almost-fatherly relationship with her.

Other friends of Mary's include WJM's Happy Homemaker Sue Ann Nivens, and Georgette Franklin, who later marries Ted.

In the final episode of the series, the entire newsroom staff is fired—with the exception of Ted—in an effort to boost sagging ratings.

The Mary Richards character makes several guest appearances on spinoffs Rhoda and Phyllis via visits to New York and San Francisco, respectively, and in scenes via telephone. During one San Francisco trip, she befriends Phyllis's main nemesis, "Mother Dexter". In the opening scene of the Rhoda pilot, Mary accompanies Rhoda to the Minneapolis airport to see her off, but the scene was not shown in U.S. syndication, nor in the DVD release of Rhoda.

== Mary and Rhoda ==
As revealed in the 2000 made-for-television movie Mary and Rhoda, following her departure as news producer from Minneapolis' WJM-TV, Mary Richards earned a master's degree in journalism and worked as a studio producer for ABC News in New York. She also married a congressman named Steven Cronin, with whom she had a daughter, Rose, circa 1980. Mary worked until Rose turns 12, then decided to quit in order to spend more time at home.

After her husband's 1999 death in a rock climbing accident, Mary discovers that he has squandered their money in his reelection campaigns. By this time, Rose is an English major at NYU. After spending time in Europe, Mary returns home to New York City in 2000 and reconnects with best friend Rhoda, also returning to New York City after having lived for a time in Paris. After job-hunting again for the first time in years, Mary is hired as a segment producer for WNYT in New York. There she works under station founder Jonah Seimeier, who's little more than half Mary's age.

== Creation ==
Mary Richards was initially intended to be a divorcée. However, divorce was still controversial at the time and CBS was afraid viewers would think she had divorced Rob Petrie, husband of Laura Petrie (portrayed by Mary Tyler Moore from 1961 to 1966 on The Dick Van Dyke Show, also on CBS). For this reason, the premise was revised to that of a single woman with a recently broken engagement. According to co-creator Allan Burns, Minnesota was selected as Mary's home after "one of the writers began talking about the strengths and weaknesses of the Vikings". A television newsroom was chosen as Mary's workplace because of the supporting characters often found there, stated co-creator James L. Brooks.

== Reception ==
Moore earned three Emmy Awards for her portrayal of Mary Richards.

Mary Richards "gave a humanely plausible version of American women—some American women—in the early and mid-'70s", Lance Morrow wrote in Time before the show's last episode: "She was single, independent, pursued her career, was interested in men but not in an obsessive, husband-trapping way. Many women in the audience felt happier with themselves because of her". When Mary spent the night with a date, he said, "men all over the country were inconsolable; they felt betrayed". The magazine, in naming The Mary Tyler Moore Show one of seventeen series that changed television, wrote that "Moore made Mary into a fully realized person, iconic but fallible, competent but flappable... Mary was human and strong enough to be laughed with and laughed at". In 1992, Entertainment Weekly called her "the first great grown-up single working woman on TV", and in 1999, Entertainment Weekly ranked Mary's opening credits hat toss as television's second greatest moment. On Bravo's 100 Greatest TV Characters, she was ranked eighth, the highest position of the four Mary Tyler Moore Show characters on this list.

In 1999, TV Guide ranked her number 21 on its 50 Greatest TV Characters of All Time list.

In 2002, TV Land honored Mary Richards with a statue on Nicollet Mall in downtown Minneapolis; it depicts Mary throwing her tam into the air, the same pose seen in the freeze frame at the end of the opening credits.
