= Sue Ann Nivens =

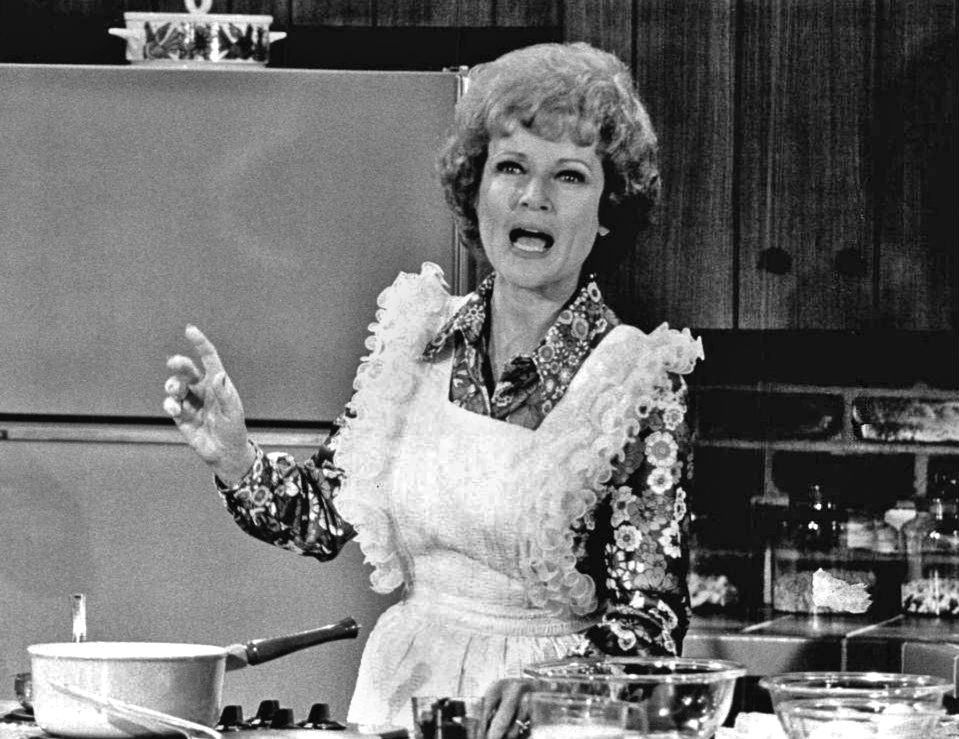
- Sue Ann on the air as "The Happy Homemaker"
- First appearance: "The Lars Affair"; September 15, 1973
- Last appearance: "The Last Show"; March 19, 1977
- Created by: James L. Brooks and Allan Burns
- Portrayed by: Betty White

In-universe information
- Gender: Female
- Occupation: "The Happy Homemaker" presenter
- Family: Lila Nivens (sister)

Sue Ann Nivens is a fictional character portrayed by Betty White on situation comedy The Mary Tyler Moore Show. Although her on-air personality is one of energetic sweetness, off-camera she is highly competitive and unpleasant.

== Casting ==
The role of Sue Ann Nivens was not specifically written for White, but script #73 of the series ("The Lars Affair", aired September 15, 1973) called for an "icky sweet Betty White type". The casting director decided to approach the star herself who, with husband Allen Ludden, was already good friends with Mary Tyler Moore and her then husband, MTM producer Grant Tinker. Producers were aware of Moore and White's friendship and were hesitant to audition White for the role, afraid of the awkwardness that might ensue if White wasn’t right for the part.

White played up Sue Ann Nivens' cheerful, home-and-hearth loving persona — a sharp contrast to the character's backbiting, sexually voracious true nature. Her first appearance in episode one of season four was intended to be a one-time guest role, but series creator James L. Brooks gave White a friendly post-show warning: "Don't make too many plans."

== The Happy Homemaker ==
Sue Ann Nivens is the relentlessly perky star of The Happy Homemaker on fictional station WJM-TV in Minneapolis, Minnesota. The program delivers cooking and decorating advice to housewives, often on ludicrous theme shows such as "A Salute to Fruit" and "What's All This Fuss About Famine?". She is a perfectionist, remarking in a season four episode titled "The Dinner Party" that she'd rather flush her Veal Prince Orloff down a toilet than serve it reheated. Sue Ann is full of helpful hints for all occasions and always ready to make lemons into lemonade; for instance, she suggests buying colorful, happy goldfish as companions for the infirm and then, when the goldfish die, using them as houseplant fertilizer.

== Relationships ==
=== Mary and Phyllis ===
Sue Ann Nivens first appears on Mary Tyler Moore as a guest at one of Mary Richards' famously disastrous parties. At the end of the night, Lars, the oft-mentioned but never-seen husband of Mary's friend/landlady, Phyllis Lindstrom, gives Sue Ann a ride home. Phyllis subsequently realizes Lars and Sue Ann are having an affair when he repeatedly comes home with clothes cleaner than when he left. Phyllis threatens to "rip Sue Ann's face off" and Mary is forced to mediate between the two to end the affair.

Eventually, Sue Ann and Mary become friendly but Sue Ann remains prickly, frequently insulting Mary's clothes, décor, sex life, etc. and often using variations of "dear, sweet, naïve Mary" to refer to her. Along with Georgette Franklin (Georgia Engel), girlfriend and eventual wife of Ted Baxter (Ted Knight), Sue Ann helps fill the void left by the departure of both Phyllis (Cloris Leachman) and Mary's best friend, Rhoda Morgenstern (Valerie Harper), for their own spin-off series. Nonetheless, Sue Ann's relationship with Mary can be competitive since Mary, who's younger and more attractive, easily draws male attention.

=== Other characters ===
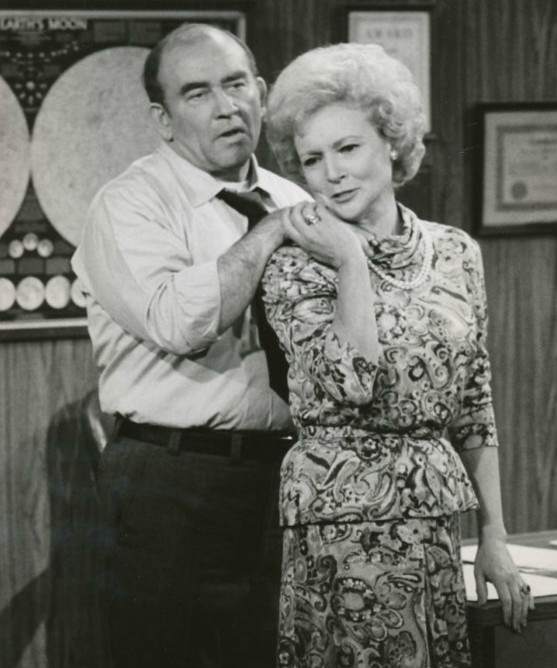
Lou and Sue Ann. Lou has just given her the bad news that her program was cancelled.

- Sue Ann often spars with newswriter Murray Slaughter (Gavin MacLeod), making cutting remarks about his baldness in response to Murray's quips about her age and promiscuity.
- She is "very close" to WJM children's television host Chuckles the Clown, having baked the first custard pie he ever sat in.
- The man she most wants to bed is Lou Grant (Ed Asner) After repeated rejections, she finally succeeds in the sixth-season episode "Once I Had A Secret Love"; Lou goes to great lengths to prevent the rest of the WJM staff from finding out.
- Younger sister Lila (Pat Priest) evokes intense feelings of sibling rivalry in Sue Ann. She causes Sue Ann a lot of grief, especially in episode three of season seven ("Sue Ann's Sister") when she accepts an offer to host a rival Minneapolis cooking show.

In the series' final season, Sue Ann's Happy Homemaker show is canceled because of low ratings. Still under contract to WJM, she'll only continue to get paid if she works at the station. After being assigned a series of menial positions (recording station break announcements; appearing as a foil for a contentious pair of kids' show puppets), Lou coerces Mary into hiring Sue Ann as a production assistant on the Six O'Clock News.

In Mary Tyler Moore's final episode, Sue Ann is fired, along with almost everyone in the WJM newsroom. She immediately bounces back, however, finding work as a traveling companion and "sort of a practical nurse" to a wealthy, elderly gentleman.

== Impact and legacy ==
Reflecting on the role, White said, "Of course, I loved Sue Ann. She was so rotten. You can’t get much more rotten than the neighborhood nymphomaniac." The role earned White two Emmy Awards as Best Supporting Actress in a Comedy Series (1975 and 1976), with a further nomination following in the show's final season, 1977. Asked about her favorites among her many awards to date, she cites the honors received for The Mary Tyler Moore Show. White gives a great deal of credit for the role's success to the scripts, speaking of being "blessed with the kind of writing on The Mary Tyler Moore Show and [the later series] The Golden Girls".

On The Golden Girls, debuting eight years later, White was cast as man-hungry Blanche Devereaux, with Rue McClanahan, the befuddled Vivian Harmon on Maude, cast as naïve Rose Nylund. The two actresses realized how similar their new roles were to their previous ones and, at the suggestion of veteran comedy director Jay Sandrich, approached the producers about switching roles. (White quotes Sandrich as saying, "If Betty plays another man-hungry neighborhood you-know-what, they're going to equate it with Sue Ann and think it's just a continuation of that.") The producers agreed, and the show went on to great success. White stated in January 2017 that she greatly enjoyed playing the character of Rose, as opposed to Blanche.
