= The Last Show (The Mary Tyler Moore Show) =

- The Mary Tyler Moore Show episode
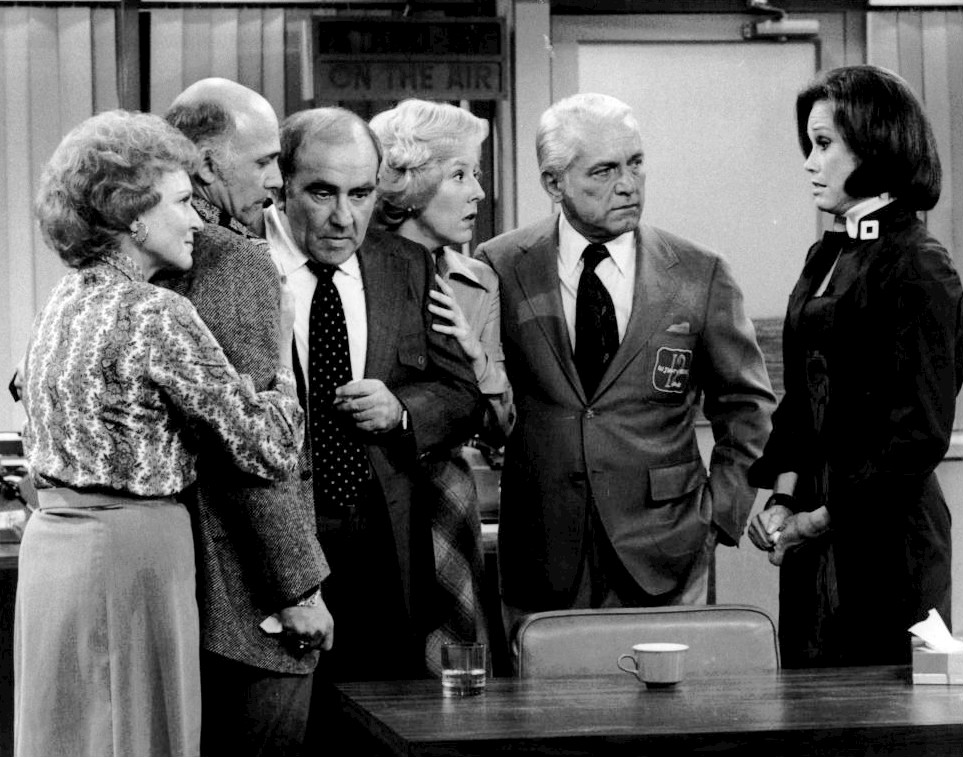
- The station crew's poignant farewell
- Episode no.: Season 7 Episode 24
- Directed by: Jay Sandrich
- Written by: James L. Brooks, Allan Burns, Ed. Weinberger, Stan Daniels, David Lloyd and Bob Ellison
- Original air dates: March 18, 1977 (Canada); March 19, 1977 (US)

Guest appearances
- Valerie Harper (Rhoda); Cloris Leachman (Phyllis); Robbie Rist (David Baxter); Vincent Gardenia (Frank Coleman)

Episode chronology
← Previous "Lou Dates Mary"	Next → —

"The Last Show" is the 168th episode and series finale of the television sitcom The Mary Tyler Moore Show, and it was written by Allan Burns, James L. Brooks, Ed. Weinberger, Stan Daniels, David Lloyd, and Bob Ellison. Internationally, it was first aired in Canada on CBC Television, March 18, 1977 at 8 p.m. In the U.S., it was one day later on Saturday, March 19, on CBS.

The episode won a Primetime Emmy Award for Outstanding Writing in a Comedy Series. In executive producer Allan Burns' Outstanding Comedy Series acceptance speech at the 29th Primetime Emmy Awards, he stated, "We kept putting off writing that last show; we frankly didn't want to do it. I think it said what we wanted it to say. It was poignant, and I believe The Mary Tyler Moore Show was, in the long run, important for many women."

== Plot summary ==
The new station manager of WJM-TV, Mr. Coleman (guest star Vincent Gardenia), is firing people left and right, and wants to do something about the Six O'Clock News' low ratings. Surprisingly, Lou, Mary, Murray, and Sue Ann are fired, but the person widely perceived as the cause of the Six O'Clock News' low ratings, Ted, is retained.

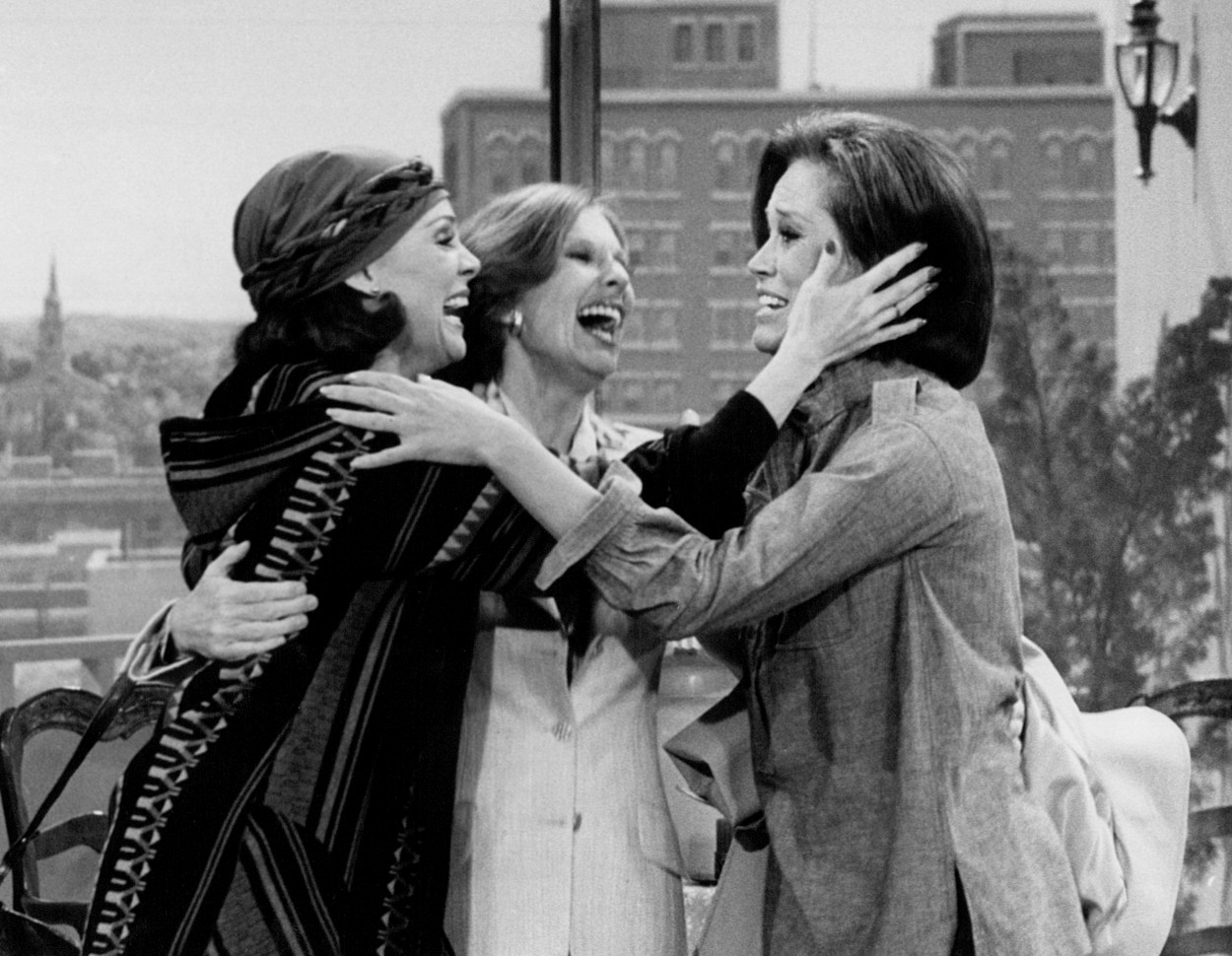
Mary, Rhoda, and Phyllis reunited at last

Everyone takes the news somewhat hard, except for Ted, who saunters back into the newsroom, but it is Mary who takes the news hardest. To cheer her up, Lou arranges for her old friends Rhoda Morgenstern and Phyllis Lindstrom to fly to Minneapolis for a surprise visit at Mary's apartment. Time had failed to tame their rivalry, however. Both agitate for Mary to move with them to New York and San Francisco, respectively, but they compromise that she stays in the Twin Cities. Rhoda gets to the heart of the matter and comforts Mary, then reluctantly allows Phyllis to do the same.

At one point, Ted threatens to resign if they fire the rest of the staff. However, he caves in quickly when pushed. This causes Murray to quip, "When a donkey flies, you don't blame him for not staying up that long."

On their final broadcast together, Ted gives his colleagues a sincere on-air sendoff, ending it by quoting "It's a Long Way to Tipperary" as it was the only thing he could come up with. Afterward, the Six O'Clock News' staff, along with Georgette, gather in the newsroom to say goodbye to each other. The memorable and oft-parodied scene culminates in an emotional huddle, during which nobody wants to let go, and needing some tissues, the group shuffles en masse toward a box of tissues on Mary's desk. Mary thanks Lou for everything he's done for her and he tries to brush it off before swallowing his pride and saying how much she means to him. Once everything has been said, Lou lifts the morale by jokingly singing "It's a Long Way to Tipperary" as everyone else gradually joins in and they walk arm in arm out the door. Finally, a very emotional Mary looks back at the room one last time, then bucks up and smiles before turning off the lights and closing the door, officially concluding The Mary Tyler Moore Show.

The original broadcast included a curtain call behind the closing credits, during which Mary Tyler Moore introduced her co-stars to the live audience as "the best cast ever." This was omitted from the final CBS repeat (on September 3, 1977) and syndicated airings, but is available on the season 7 DVD release. This is the only episode of The Mary Tyler Moore Show in which all eight of the regular series characters (Mary, Lou, Ted, Murray, Rhoda, Phyllis, Georgette, and Sue Ann) appear, and the curtain call is the only time the eight actors are all seen together at the same time.

== Reception ==
When the architects of the sitcom Friends were about to write their series finale, they watched several other sitcom finales. Co-creator Marta Kauffman said that '"The Last Show" was the "gold standard" and that it influenced the finale of Friends.

In 2011, the finale was ranked #3 on the TV Guide Network special TV's Most Unforgettable Finales.

On the original broadcast, the episode scored a 25.5 rating, ranking #6 for the week.
