= Lou Grant =

Fictional character from The Mary Tyler Moore Show

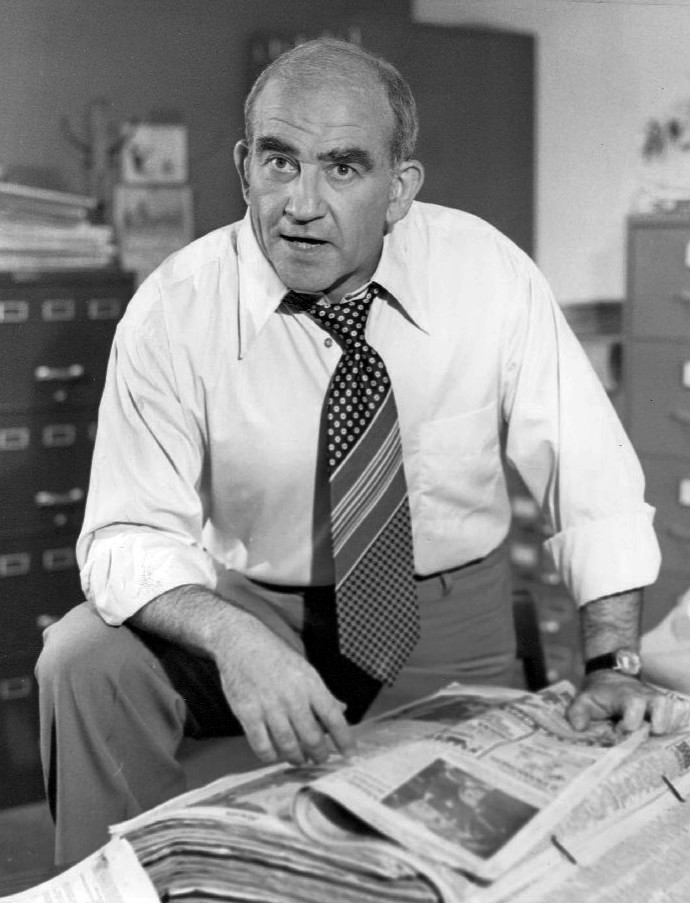
- Ed Asner as Lou Grant
- First appearance: "Love Is All Around"; September 19, 1970
- Last appearance: "Charlie"; September 13, 1982
- Created by: James L. Brooks; Allan Burns
- Portrayed by: Ed Asner

In-universe information
- Gender: Male
- Occupation: City editor of The Los Angeles Tribune newspaper Former News producer at WJM-TV Station; Former Reporter; Former Copy boy
- Family: John Simpson Grant (father); Ellen Hammersmith Grant (mother); Irene “Reenie” (cousin)
- Spouses: Edie Grant (divorced)
- Children: Ruth (daughter); Jane (daughter); Sara (daughter)
- Relatives: Amy (granddaughter); Abby (granddaughter); Eric (grandson); Matthew (grandson); Allen Stevens (nephew); Bill Phelps (son-in-law) (By 1979, he had begun referring to one of his daughters as "Ellen", and she had a young son named Nick.)

Lou Grant is a fictional character played by Ed Asner in two television series produced by MTM Enterprises for CBS. The first was The Mary Tyler Moore Show (1970–1977), a half-hour situation comedy in which the character was the news director at fictional television station WJM-TV in Minneapolis. A spinoff series, entitled Lou Grant (1977–1982), was an hour-long serious dramatic series that frequently engaged in social commentary, featuring the same character as city editor of the fictional Los Angeles Tribune. Although spin-offs are common on American television, Lou Grant remains one of a very few characters played by the same actor to have a leading role on both a popular comedy and a popular dramatic series.

The journalist Peter Noyes served as an inspiration for the character.

== Fictional biography ==
=== Pre-WJM-TV ===
Although the setting of The Mary Tyler Moore Show might have implied that he was a native Minnesotan, Lou Grant in fact established that he was born in the fictional rural town of Goshen, Michigan in 1925. He was the son of John Simpson Grant and Ellen Hammersmith Grant; his grandfather was a pharmacist. At some point in his youth and early adulthood he developed a lifelong affection for westerns, particularly those starring John Wayne. In high school, he was a tackle for his school's football team. Soon after high school, he married Edie MacKenzie (Priscilla Morrill), at an age young enough to have four grandchildren before he turned 50.

After marriage he became a combatant in World War II. He served in both the Pacific and European Theatres. At one point, he was a sergeant in the Pacific-based 2nd Marine Division. During another phase of his wartime service he was injured by a grenade in France, the last remnants of which were removed only in his late 40s. He was also part of a unit that liberated an unknown town in Germany. During the war he met and befriended Walter Cronkite.

He attended college (although on several occasions he stated he never had the chance to attend), likely after the war. He started his career in print journalism as a copy boy but it is unclear whether this was in Detroit, Minneapolis or San Francisco as he worked for papers in all three cities. In this period of his life, he met and worked with Charlie Hume (Mason Adams) for the first time at the San Francisco Call-Bulletin, and worked with Jack Riley (Eugene Roche).

=== WJM-TV ===
At some point in his late 30s he made the transition to broadcast journalism, and by the time of the 1966 elections he was working on a radio news show, as he explained to Mary Richards on the occasion of her producing her first news show all by herself at WJM-TV. He eventually became the head of the WJM news department. He worked in that capacity for 11 years. For most of that period, Mary Richards served as his associate producer (later producer, with Lou having the title of executive producer, and she reported to him), Ted Baxter as his news anchor and Murray Slaughter as his head writer.

Of these relationships, the one with Richards was likely the closest. Except for one abortive attempt at romance, his general attitude towards Mary was paternalistic. A typical display of his affection for Richards came when his nephew, Allen, tried to put the moves on Mary. Lou became infuriated and said "Listen you, let me remind you of something, and remember this forever. I think of this girl here as if she were my own daughter and that means she is your cousin, you get my drift?"

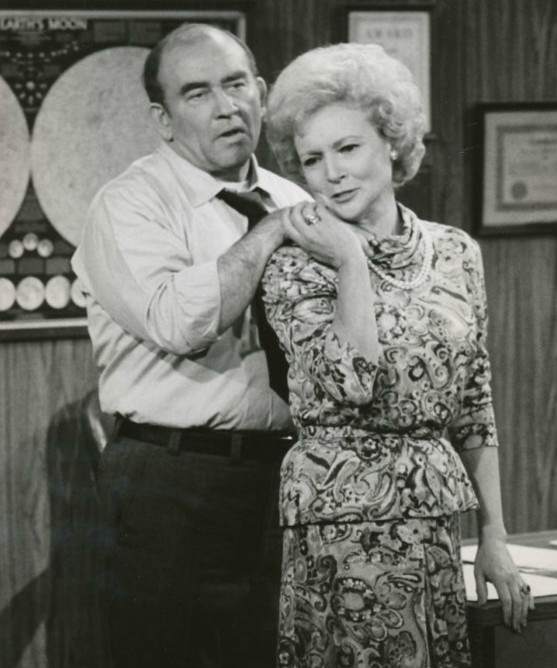
Lou delivers the news to Sue Ann that her program has been cancelled.

He was a heavy drinker, with a penchant for hiding whole bottles of scotch in his desk drawers. His personality was outwardly that of a tough loner and a workaholic man's man. The real Lou Grant was somewhat more complicated. He was quick to anger and had a violent streak, at times threatening the barely competent Ted Baxter and once causing him physical injury. However, those who understood him best, like Mary Richards, knew he was also painfully shy, with a particular awkwardness around women. With those few people he trusted, Lou was protective and could at times confide his emotional vulnerability. When he learned that Ted considered him his "best friend", he took pity on him, at least until Ted infuriated him again.

Lou's marriage began to slide as he and Edie both adjusted to life after parenthood. They briefly separated for the first time almost immediately after their youngest daughter got married and left the house. Though they reconciled on this occasion, they would occasionally re-separate and seek marriage counseling over the next two years. In about 1973 he and Edie divorced, after which Edie promptly remarried. Lou, who had been consistently portrayed as a devoted husband, tentatively began to date again. He went out with a woman named Charlene (Sheree North; Janis Paige in "Menage-a-Lou" of Season 6) in particularly Season 5; Mary's best friend Rhoda Morgenstern in Season 4; Mary's next-door neighbor, Paula Kovacks (Penny Marshall) in Season 6; Mary's Aunt Flo (Eileen Heckart) in Seasons 6 and 7; and even with Mary herself in the penultimate episode. He and Sue Ann Nivens had a drunken one-night-stand.

Professionally, his career with WJM-TV ended in the final episode. Lou, along with Mary, Murray, and Sue Ann Nivens, was fired due to low ratings. Lou's sometime-nemesis, the vacuous Ted Baxter—the real cause for the ratings slide—was retained.

=== Los Angeles Tribune ===
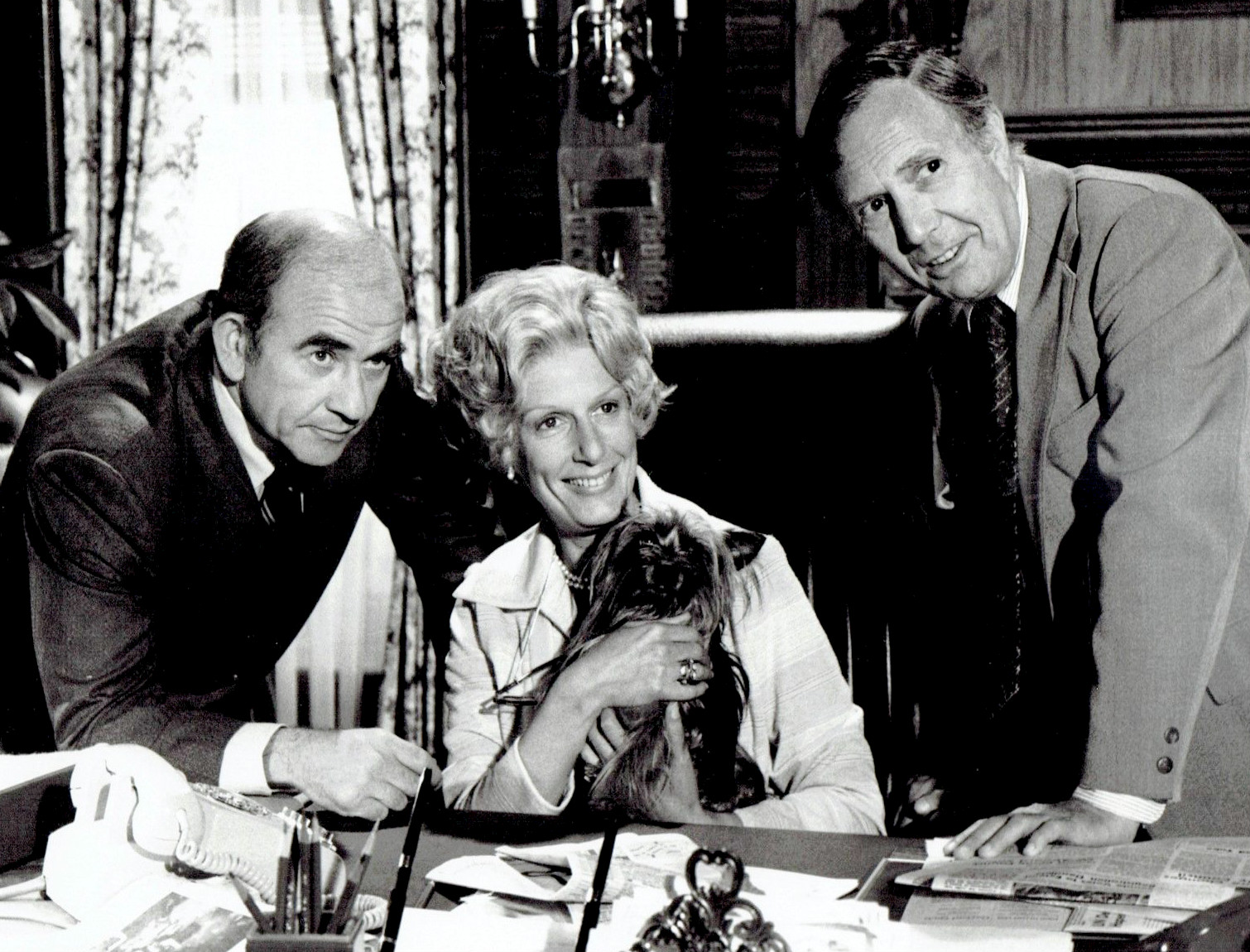
Grant with Mrs. Pynchon and Charlie Hume.

Lou Grant, a spin-off drama from the comedy show Mary Tyler Moore, opens with Grant relocating to Los Angeles, to work with as City Editor with an old buddy, Charley Hume, who is managing editor of the fictitious Los Angeles Tribune, His subordinates at that time included staff reporters Joe Rossi (Robert Walden); Billie Newman (Linda Kelsey); her predecessor, Carla Mardigian (Rebecca Balding); and photographer Dennis "Animal" Price (Daryl Anderson). His assistant city editor was Art Donovan (Jack Bannon). Charlie Hume was now his boss, who ultimately reported to publisher Margaret Jones Pynchon (Nancy Marchand). They, like those back at WJM, became his family. In the last episode of season one it is revealed that he has just turned 50, a continuity error from The Mary Tyler Moore Show; he would have turned 53 in 1978. There is one character on Lou Grant, reporter Rosenthal, who is mentioned frequently but never seen. Lou Grant was cancelled after the star, Ed Asner, publicly protested U.S. interventions into the politics of Latin American countries.

== Unofficial appearances ==
- During the second season of the Lou Grant series, the Toronto Sun newspaper arranged a series of press conferences, interviews and announcements (with participation from Asner), stating that Lou Grant was joining the Sun as their new senior city editor. Asner (as Grant) ostensibly worked in the newsroom for a day, and the March 23, 1979 issue of the Sun newspaper actually formally named Lou Grant as city editor on their masthead. The publicity stunt concluded with Grant being "fired" from the Sun after one day, allegedly for being "too disruptive to the flow of the newsroom" due to of all the news organizations following him around with cameras.
- In a 1984 episode of Saturday Night Live, on which Asner was a guest, Lou hired a team of mercenaries to "rescue" Mary Richards after she got stuck in the '70s in syndicated reruns. But Mary refused rescue on the grounds that she never ages and never gains weight, and that people still like her. Mary Richards and the rest of the Mary Tyler Moore Show characters hadn't existed anywhere, except in reruns, for several years. (Lou Grant had been cancelled about 2 years previously.)
- In 1996, the character appeared on "Call Waiting", an episode of Roseanne, in a dream sequence experienced by the show's lead. Roseanne (Roseanne Barr) was Mary and Dan (John Goodman) was Lou, and the two got into a heated argument. Lou stomped out, but quickly returned and was then played by Asner. (He commented about not feeling like himself.) Asner was uncredited.
- In 1998, Asner appeared in a cameo role as an Associated Press editor in the miniseries More Tales of the City (based on the series of Armistead Maupin novels). Though not identified by any name in dialogue, the character's demeanor was similar to that of the Lou Grant character. However, the character was identified as "Jack Lederer" in the credits, and the character's apparent age -- if meant to be Lou Grant -- doesn't fit with the 1978 setting of the show (Asner was nearly 70 at the time of filming, while Lou Grant in the mid-to-late-1970s would have been around 50).
- In a 2000 episode of the short lived Ellen Show, series regular Cloris Leachman reunites with Mary Tyler Moore. Cloris had played Phyllis on the Mary Tyler Moore show and its spinoff, Phyllis. Though the Mary and Cloris reunion was advertised well publicized, Ed Asner had a surprise cameo as Santa Clause. Mary called him "Mister Clause," in homage to the fact that her character had always called Lou Grant "Mister Grant."
- In 2004, Asner unofficially reprised the role in a series of ads promoting Twin Cities station KSTP-TV, a real television station in the same market as the fictional WJM-TV.
- Additionally in 2013, Asner again reprised the role for a series of promos for The Mary Tyler Moore Show airing on MeTV.

== Reception ==
Asner won five Primetime Emmy Awards for his portrayal of Lou, with three of these awards for The Mary Tyler Moore Show and two for Lou Grant. Bravo ranked Lou 35th on their list of the 100 greatest TV characters.
