= Phyllis Lindstrom =

Fictional character from The Mary Tyler Moore Show

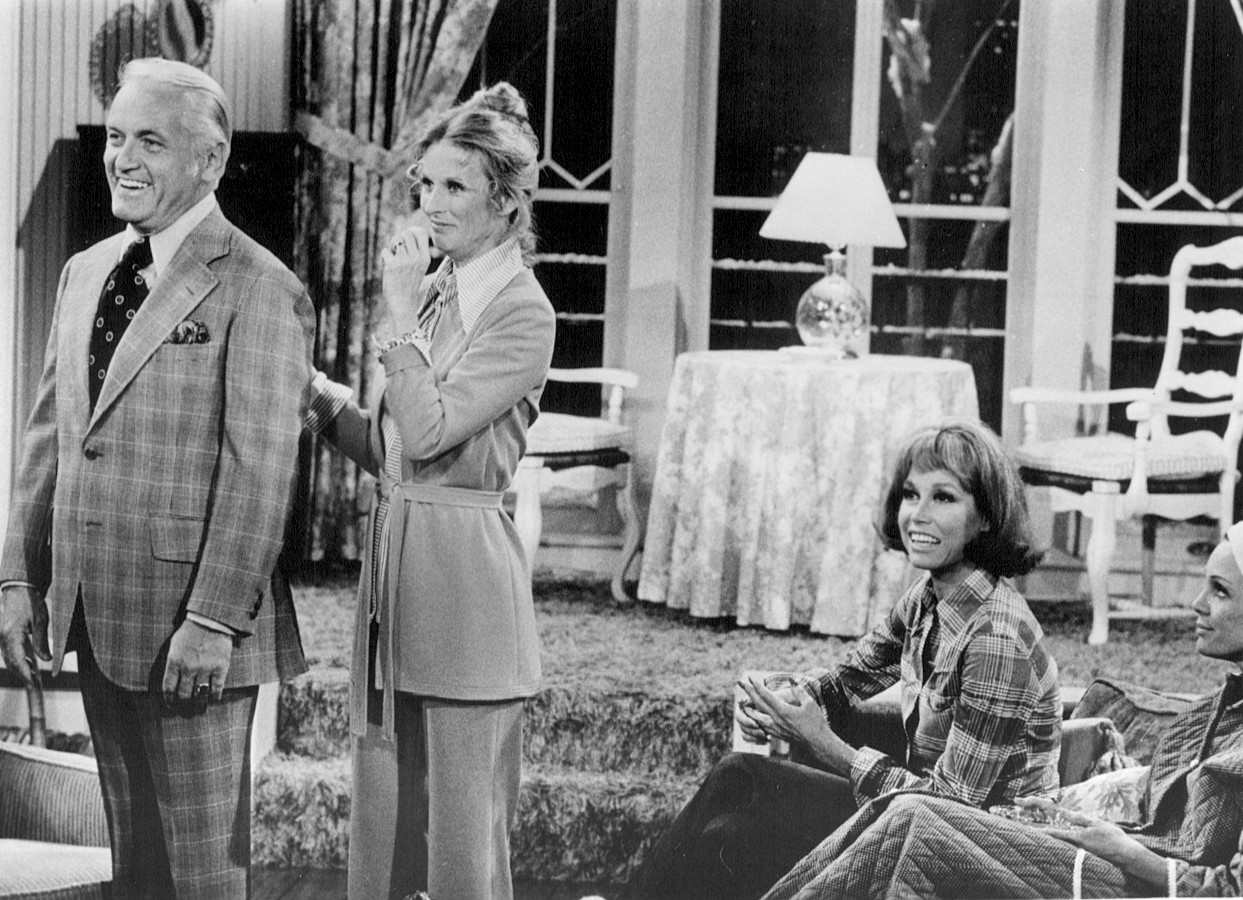
- Phyllis talks Ted into running for local office.
- First appearance: "Love Is All Around"; September 19, 1970
- Last appearance: "The Last Show"; March 19, 1977
- Created by: James L. Brooks and Allan Burns
- Portrayed by: Cloris Leachman

In-universe information
- Gender: Female
- Occupation: Assistant at Erskine Photography Studio; Administrative Assistant to San Francisco City Supervisor Real Estate Agent
- Family: Ben Sutherland (brother); Audrey Dexter (mother-in-law); Jonathan Dexter (stepfather-in-law); Louise (second cousin by marriage)
- Spouse: Lars Lindstrom (deceased)
- Children: Bess Lindstrom

Phyllis Lindstrom is a fictional character portrayed by Cloris Leachman on The Mary Tyler Moore Show and its spin-off series Phyllis.

== The Mary Tyler Moore Show ==
Phyllis Lindstrom (née Sutherland, born in 1931 in San Francisco) is Mary Richards' snobbish, self-absorbed, interfering friend and downstairs neighbor. She married dermatologist Dr. Lars Lindstrom in 1955. Phyllis frequently mentions and quotes Lars, but he is never seen on the show. The Lindstroms manage the large Minneapolis rental property where they live with Mary and upstairs neighbor Rhoda Morgenstern (Valerie Harper). Mary develops a close relationship with the Lindstroms' daughter Bess (Lisa Gerritsen).

Rhoda and Phyllis maintain an adversarial but talkative relationship. In the series' first episode, Phyllis actively prevents Rhoda from claiming a newly vacated apartment so Mary can move in instead.

In season four opener "The Lars Affair", Phyllis clashes with the man-hungry hostess of WJM's Happy Homemaker show, Sue Ann Nivens (Betty White), following Sue Ann's affair with Lars. Phyllis and Sue Ann meet again in the episode "Phyllis Whips Inflation", Leachman's penultimate Mary Tyler Moore appearance. Colleagues attempt to prevent the pair from running into each other at the station; when they do, self-centered Phyllis plaintively asks Sue Ann if any jobs are available on her show.

Phyllis appears in one sixty minute episode "Rhoda's Wedding" (two parts in syndication) of the Mary Tyler Moore Show spinoff Rhoda. In the episode, Phyllis asks for the opportunity to participate in Rhoda's wedding and is appointed the responsibility to pick up Rhoda and drive her to the ceremony. Phyllis forgets to do so, forcing Rhoda to take the subway, running through the streets of New York in her wedding dress and veil.

Phyllis (and Rhoda) later returned to Mary Tyler Moore for "The Last Show", the program's March 19, 1977 series finale. This is the character's only reappearance subsequent to the launch of the spinoff.

== Phyllis ==
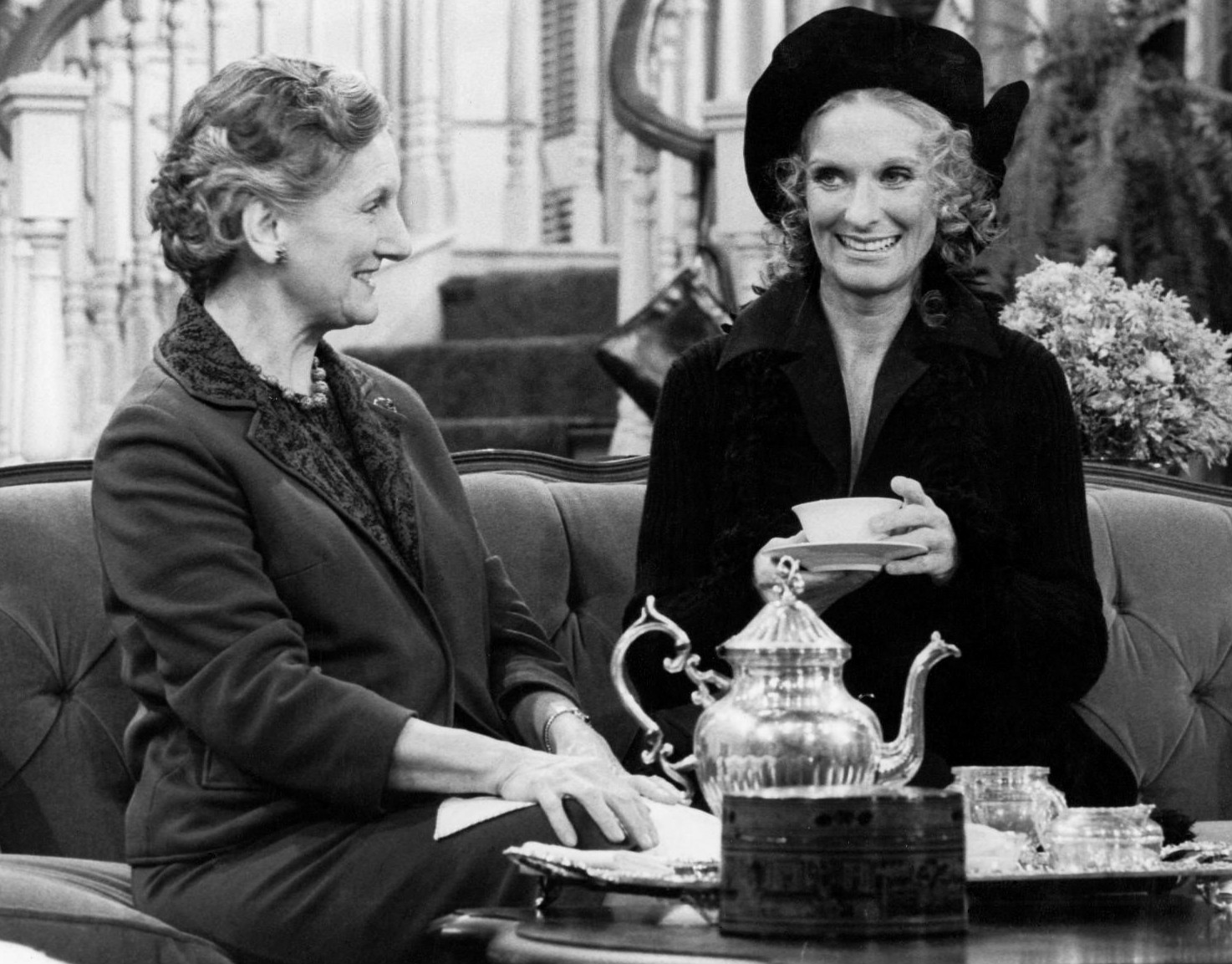
Audrey and Phyllis in the premiere episode of Phyllis

In 1975, Leachman left The Mary Tyler Moore Show to star in spin-off series Phyllis, in which Phyllis and Bess relocate to Phyllis' hometown, San Francisco, following the death of Lars. Still frequently oblivious and self-centered, Phyllis must now work for a living, as Lars died without savings (due to bad investments) and without insurance.

They move in with Lars' mother Audrey (Jane Rose) and Audrey's new husband, Judge Jonathan Dexter (Henry Jones). Phyllis' major nemesis is Jonathan's sharp-tongued mother, Sally (Judith Lowry), an irritable, impatient woman known as "Mother Dexter". Mother Dexter gets along well with Bess.

Although she is without many obvious employable skills, in the first season Phyllis is employed at Erskine Photography Studio. In the second and final season, the series was retooled and Phyllis works as an administrative assistant for a city supervisor.

Mary Tyler Moore appears as Mary Richards in two Phyllis episodes, once in the first season and then again in the second.
