= The Mary Tyler Moore Show =

American television sitcom (1970–1977)

- Genre: Sitcom
- Created by: James L. Brooks; Allan Burns
- Starring: Mary Tyler Moore; Ed Asner; Gavin MacLeod; Ted Knight; Cloris Leachman; Valerie Harper; Georgia Engel; Betty White
- Theme music composer: Sonny Curtis
- Opening theme: "Love Is All Around", written and performed by Sonny Curtis
- Composer: Patrick Williams
- Country of origin: United States
- Original language: English
- No. of seasons: 7
- No. of episodes: 168 (list of episodes)

Production
- Executive producers: James L. Brooks; Allan Burns
- Producers: David Davis; Lorenzo Music; Ed. Weinberger; Stan Daniels
- Running time: 25–26 minutes
- Production company: MTM Enterprises

Original release
- Network: CBS
- Release: September 19, 1970 – March 19, 1977

Related
- Rhoda (1974–1979); Phyllis (1975–1977); Lou Grant (1977–1982)

The Mary Tyler Moore Show (also known simply as Mary Tyler Moore) is an American television sitcom created by James L. Brooks and Allan Burns and starring Mary Tyler Moore. The show originally aired on CBS from September 19, 1970, to March 19, 1977. Moore portrayed Mary Richards, an unmarried, independent woman focused on her career as associate producer of a news show at the fictional local station WJM in Minneapolis. The ensemble cast also starred Ed Asner, Gavin MacLeod, Ted Knight, Georgia Engel, Betty White, Valerie Harper as friend and neighbor Rhoda Morgenstern, and Cloris Leachman as friend and landlady Phyllis Lindstrom.

The Mary Tyler Moore Show proved to be a groundbreaking series in the era of second-wave feminism, portraying a central female character who was neither married nor dependent on a man was a rarity on American television in the 1970s. The show has been celebrated for its complex, sympathetic characters and storylines. The Mary Tyler Moore Show received consistent praise from critics and high ratings during its original run. It earned 29 Primetime Emmy Awards, including Outstanding Comedy Series three years in a row (1975–1977). Moore received the Primetime Emmy Award for Outstanding Lead Actress in a Comedy Series three times. The series also launched three spin-offs: Rhoda, Phyllis, and Lou Grant. In 2013, the Writers Guild of America ranked The Mary Tyler Moore Show No. 6 on its list of the "101 Best Written TV Series of All Time".

== Seasons ==
Season	Episodes	Originally released		Rank	Rating
Season	Episodes	First released	Last released	Rank	Rating
1	24	September 19, 1970	March 6, 1971	22	20.3
2	24	September 18, 1971	March 4, 1972	10	23.7
3	24	September 16, 1972	March 3, 1973	7	23.6
4	24	September 15, 1973	March 2, 1974	9	23.1
5	24	September 14, 1974	March 8, 1975	11	24.0
6	24	September 13, 1975	March 6, 1976	19	21.9
7	24	September 25, 1976	March 19, 1977	39	19.2

== Premise ==
Mary Richards (Moore) is a 30-year-old single woman who moves to Minneapolis on the heels of a broken engagement. She applies for a secretarial job at television station WJM, but the position is already taken. She is instead offered the post of associate producer of the station's six o'clock news program. She befriends tough but lovable boss Lou Grant (Ed Asner), newswriter Murray Slaughter (Gavin MacLeod), and buffoonish anchorman Ted Baxter (Ted Knight). Mary is later promoted to producer of the show, though her duties remain the same.

Mary rents a third-floor studio apartment in a 19th-century house from friend Phyllis Lindstrom (Cloris Leachman). Mary and upstairs neighbor Rhoda Morgenstern (Valerie Harper) become best friends.

Characters introduced later in the series include the acerbic, man-hungry hostess of WJM's Happy Homemaker show, Sue Ann Nivens (Betty White), and soft-voiced, sweet-natured Georgette Franklin (Georgia Engel), as Ted Baxter's girlfriend (and eventual wife).

At the beginning of season 6, after both Rhoda and Phyllis move away (providing a premise for two spinoffs), Mary relocates to a one-bedroom apartment in a high-rise building. Minneapolis's Cedar Square West was used for establishing shots.

From the beginning, issues such as workplace discrimination against women figured into episode stories. In the third season, issues such as equal pay for women, pre-marital sex, and homosexuality are woven into the show's comedic plots. In season four, marital infidelity and divorce are explored with Phyllis and Lou, respectively.

In the fifth season, Mary refuses to reveal a news source and is jailed for contempt of court. While in jail, she befriends a prostitute (Barbara Colby) who seeks Mary's help in a subsequent episode. In the highly rated sixth-season episode "The Seminar", Betty Ford appears in a cameo role, becoming the first First Lady to appear on a television sitcom.

The show's final seasons explore death in "Chuckles Bites the Dust" and juvenile offenders in "Mary's Delinquent". Ted suffers a heart attack. Ted and Georgette contend with intimate marital problems, deal with infertility, and adopt a child. Mary overcomes an addiction to sleeping pills. Mary dates many men on and off over the years but remains single throughout the series.

One of the show's running gags is Mary's inability to throw a successful, problem-free party. Various disasters throughout the seasons include the break-up of two of Mary's closest friends, an insufficient amount of food due to unexpected guests, a power failure while attendees await the arrival of a high-profile guest of honor (Johnny Carson), and the birth of Ted and Georgette's baby.

== Characters ==
- Mary Richards (Mary Tyler Moore), a single native Minnesotan, moves to Minneapolis in 1970 at age 30 and becomes associate producer of WJM-TV's Six O'Clock News. Her sincere, kind demeanor often acts as a foil for the personalities of her co-workers and friends.
- Lou Grant (Ed Asner) is producer (later executive producer) of the news. His tough and grumpy demeanor initially hides his kind-hearted nature which is gradually revealed as the series progresses. He is referred to as "Lou" by everyone, including Mary's friends, with the exception of Mary herself, who can rarely bring herself to call him anything other than "Mr. Grant". He is married to Edie (Priscilla Morrill), but during the run of the show they separate and divorce.
- Murray Slaughter (Gavin MacLeod), head writer, makes frequent quips about Ted Baxter's mangling of his news copy and Sue Ann Nivens's aggressive, man-hungry attitude. He is Mary's closest coworker and close friend. Murray is married to the occasionally seen Marie (Joyce Bulifant) and, like Lou Grant, he has three biological daughters. Murray and Marie also adopt an orphaned Vietnamese boy during the series.
- Ted Baxter (Ted Knight) is the dim-witted, vain, and miserly anchorman of the Six O'Clock News. He frequently makes mistakes and is oblivious to the actual nature of the topics covered on the show but, to cover for tormenting insecurity, he postures as the country's best news journalist. He is often criticized by others, especially Murray and Lou, for his many shortcomings, but is never fired from his position. Initially a comic buffoon in the series, Ted's better nature is gradually revealed as the series unfolds, helped along by his sweet, seemingly vague, but frequently perceptive wife Georgette.
- Rhoda Morgenstern (Valerie Harper) (1970–1974, 1975, 1977) (Regular, seasons 1–4; Guest, seasons 6–7) is Mary's upstairs neighbor and best friend. She works as a window dresser, first at the fictional Bloomfield's Department Store and later at Hempel's Department Store. Though insecure about her appearance, she is also outgoing and sardonic, making frequent wisecracks, often at her own expense. Like Mary, she is single. She dates frequently, routinely joking about her disastrous dates. Rhoda moves to New York City and falls in love after the fourth season, beginning the spinoff series Rhoda.
- Phyllis Lindstrom (Cloris Leachman) (1970–1975) (Season 1–5, 7 Guest) is Mary's snobbish friend and landlady. She is in many episodes of the first two seasons, after which her appearances decline in frequency. She is married to unseen dermatologist Lars and has a precocious daughter, Bess (Lisa Gerritsen). She is actively involved in groups and clubs and is a political activist and a supporter of Women's Liberation. Rhoda and Phyllis are usually at odds and often trade insults. After appearing in three episodes of season five, Leachman left to star in the spin-off show Phyllis. In that series, it is explained Phyllis has been widowed. Discovering that her husband had virtually no assets and that she must support herself, Phyllis returns to her home town of San Francisco.
- Georgette Franklin Baxter (Georgia Engel) (1972–77) (Season 3–7) is the somewhat ditzy girlfriend of stentorian news anchor Ted Baxter. Mary Tyler Moore described her as a cross between Stan Laurel and Marilyn Monroe. She and Mary get along fantastically, and Georgette helps fill the void created by the departure of Rhoda and Phyllis. Georgette, a co-worker of Rhoda's at Hempel's Department Store, is introduced as a guest at one of Mary's parties. Later, she works for a car rental service, as a Golden Girl, and for Rhoda selling plants. Georgette is devoted to Ted and they eventually marry in Mary's apartment. They adopt a child named David (Robbie Rist), and later, Georgette gives birth in Mary's apartment to a girl who is (temporarily) named Mary Lou.
- Sue Ann Nivens (Betty White) (1973–1977) (Season 4–7), host of WJM's The Happy Homemaker show. While her demeanor is superficially cheerful, she makes judgmental comments about Mary, exchanges personal insults with Murray, and uses many sexual double entendres, especially around Lou, to whom she is strongly attracted.

== Production ==
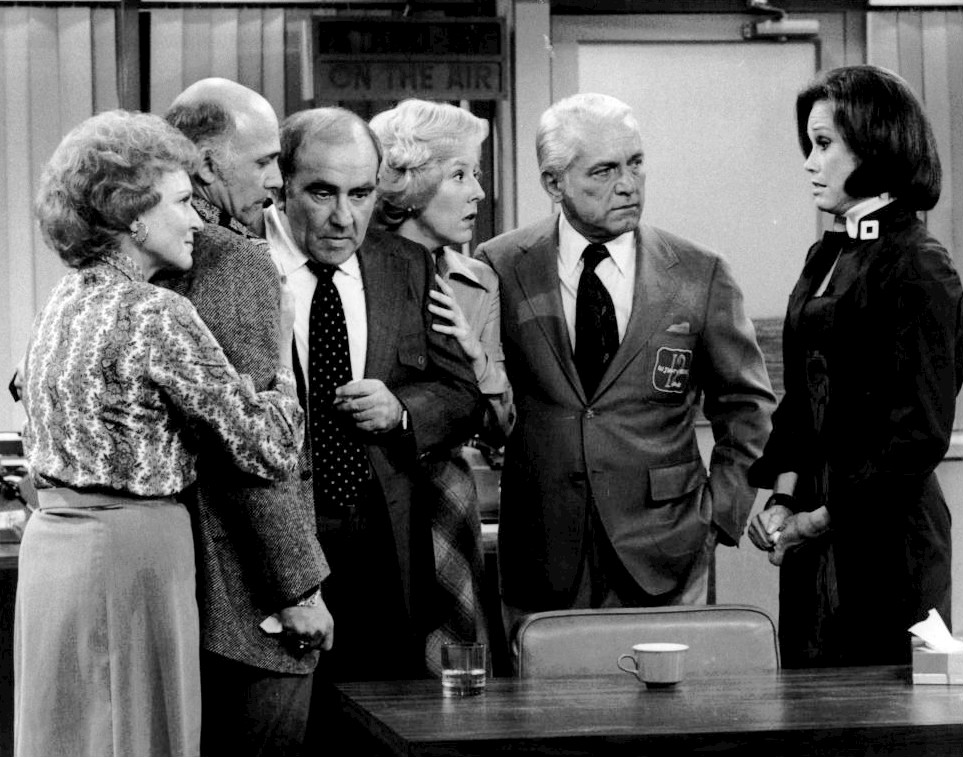
Left to right: Sue Ann Nivens, Murray Slaughter, Lou Grant, Georgette and Ted Baxter, Mary Richards (final episode, 1977)

When Moore was approached about the show, she "was unsure and unwilling to commit, fearing any new role might suffer in comparison with her Laura Petrie character in The Dick Van Dyke Show, which also aired on CBS, and was already cemented as one of the most popular parts in TV history". Moore's character was initially intended to be a divorcée, but divorce was still controversial at the time. In addition, CBS was afraid viewers might think that Mary had divorced Rob Petrie, Laura's husband on The Dick Van Dyke Show, so the premise was changed to that of a single woman with a recently broken engagement. Notably, Van Dyke never guest-starred in any episode, although his brother Jerry Van Dyke guest-starred in a couple of episodes during the third and fourth seasons. (Jerry had also appeared in four episodes of The Dick Van Dyke Show.)

According to co-creator Allan Burns, Minnesota was selected for the show's location after "one of the writers began talking about the strengths and weaknesses of the Vikings". A television newsroom was chosen for the show's workplace because of the supporting characters often found there, stated co-creator James Brooks. Aside from establishing shots and the title sequence, the show was filmed at the CBS Studio Center in Los Angeles.

=== Kenwood Parkway house ===
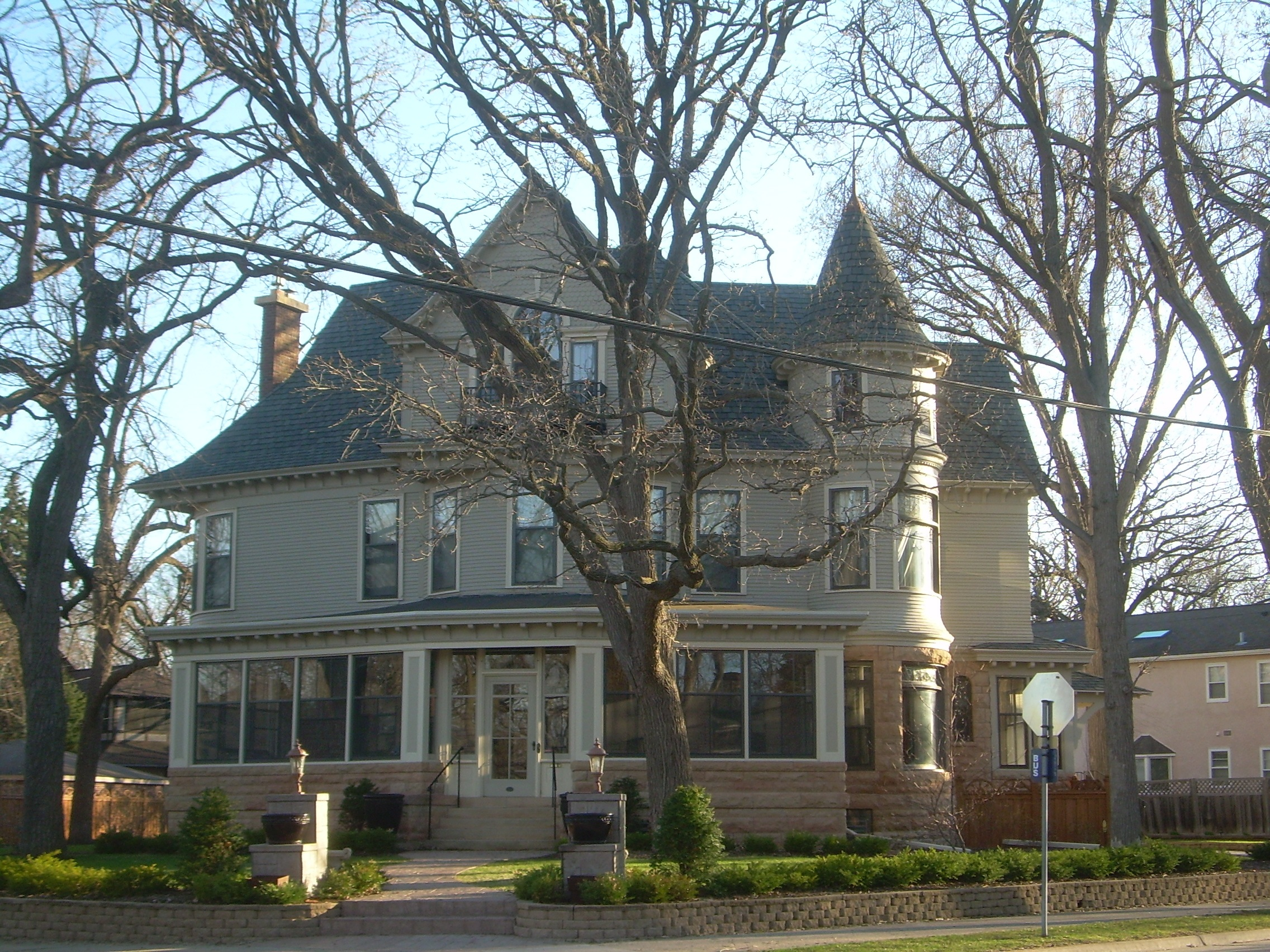
The house on Kenwood Parkway

In 1995, Entertainment Weekly said that "TV's most famous bachelorette pad" was Mary's apartment. The fictitious address was 119 North Weatherly, but the exterior establishing shots were of a real house in Minneapolis at 2104 Kenwood Parkway. In the real house, an unfinished attic occupied the space behind the window recreated on the interior studio set of Mary's apartment. Minneapolis architect Edward Somerby Stebbins designed the 1892 residence for S. E. Davis.

Once fans of the series discovered where exterior shots had been taken, the house became a popular tourist destination. According to Moore, the woman who lived in the house was "overwhelmed" by people showing up and "asking if Mary was around". To discourage crews from filming additional footage of the house, the owners placed an "Impeach Nixon" sign beneath the window where Mary supposedly lived. The house continued to attract multiple tour buses a day more than a decade after production ended.

In January 2017, the house was marketed for a price of $1.7 million.

=== Title sequences ===
The opening title sequence features many scenes filmed on location in Minneapolis in both summer and winter, as well as a few clips from the show's studio scenes. The sequence changed each season, but always ended with Mary tossing her hat into the air in front of what was then the flagship Donaldson's department store at the intersection of South 7th Street and Nicollet Mall in downtown Minneapolis. The hat toss was ranked by Entertainment Weekly as the second greatest moment in 1970s television. On May 8, 2002, Moore was in attendance when cable network TV Land dedicated a statue to her that captured her iconic throw. In 2010, TV Guide ranked the show's opening title sequence No. 3 on a list of TV's Top Ten credit sequences, as selected by readers. In 2017, James Charisma of Paste ranked the show's opening sequence No. 15 on a list of The 75 Best TV Title Sequences of All Time.

Sonny Curtis wrote and performed the opening theme song, "Love Is All Around". The lyrics changed between the first and second seasons, in part to reflect Mary Richards having become settled in her new home. The later lyrics, which accompanied many more episodes at a time when the show's popularity was at a peak, are more widely known, and most covers of the song use these words. For season 7, there was a slightly new musical arrangement for the opening theme, but the lyrics remained the same as seasons 2–6.

No supporting cast members are credited during the show's opening (though from the second season on, shots of them appear). The ending sequences show snippets of the cast, as well as any major guest stars in that episode, with the actors' names at the bottom of the screen. Other on-location scenes are also shown during the closing credits, including a rear shot of Mary holding hands with her date, played by Moore's then-husband, Grant Tinker, and Moore and Valerie Harper feeding ducks on the bank of a pond in a Minneapolis park (this shot remained in the credits, even after Harper left the show). Many of the opening shots were filmed at Lake of the Isles. The ending sequence music is an instrumental version of "Love is All Around". The ending finishes with Mimsie the cat meowing within the MTM company logo.

== Cultural impact ==
In 2007, Time put The Mary Tyler Moore Show on its list of "17 Shows That Changed TV". Time stated that the series "liberated TV for adults—of both sexes" by being "a sophisticated show about grownups among other grownups, having grownup conversations". The Associated Press said that the show "took 20 years of pointless, insipid situation comedy and spun it on its heels. [It did this by] pioneer[ing] reality comedy and the establishment of clearly defined and motivated secondary characters."

Tina Fey, creator and lead actress of the 2006-debut sitcom 30 Rock, explained that Moore's show helped inspire 30 Rock's emphasis on office relationships. "Our goal is to try to be like The Mary Tyler Moore Show, where it's not about doing the news", said Fey. Entertainment Weekly also noted that the main characters of 30 Rock mirror those of The Mary Tyler Moore Show.

When the writers of the sitcom Friends were about to create their series finale, they watched several other sitcom finales. Co-creator Marta Kauffman said that the last episode of The Mary Tyler Moore Show was the "gold standard" and that it influenced the finale of Friends.

=== Spin-offs, specials and reunions ===
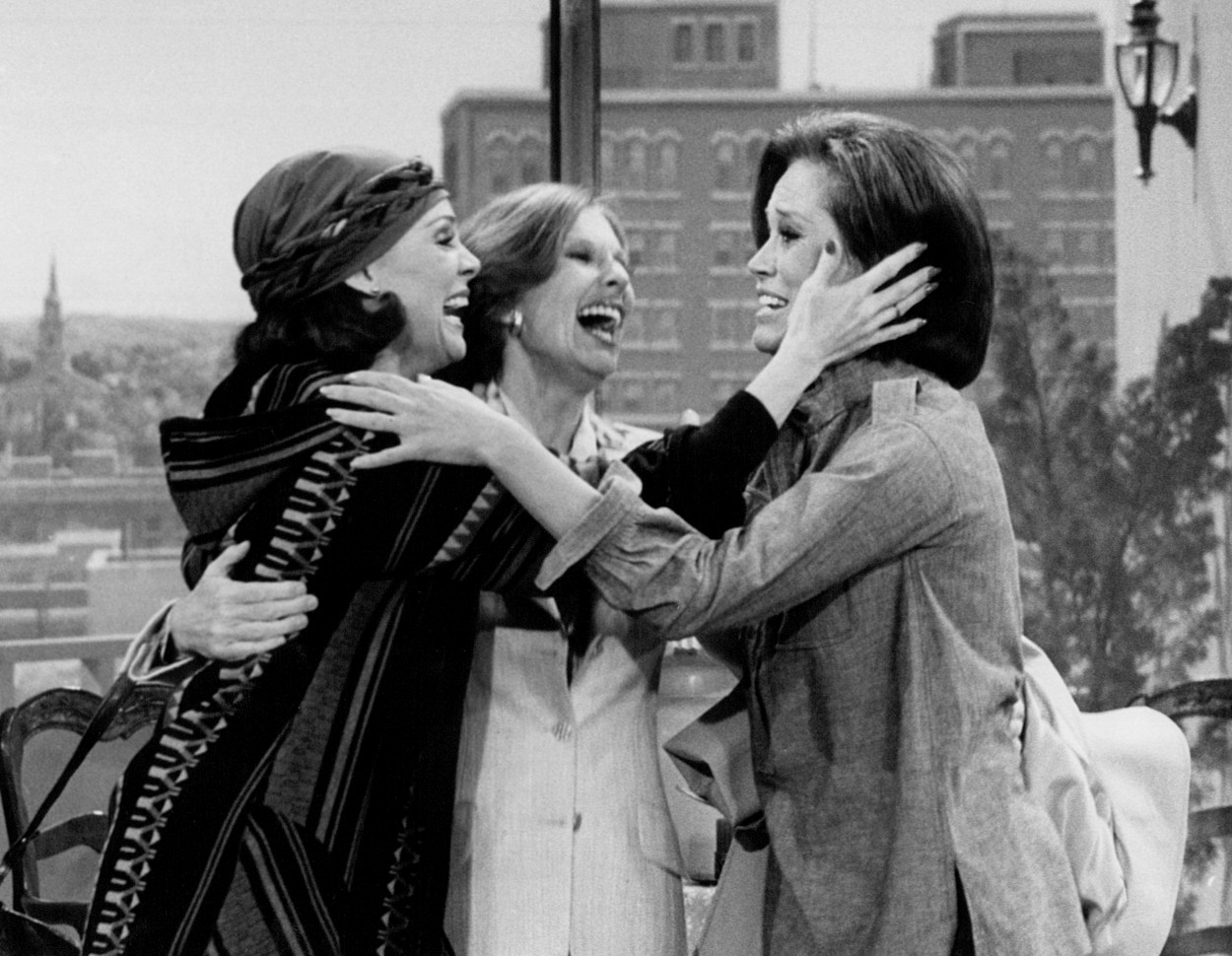
Valerie Harper, Cloris Leachman and Mary Tyler Moore in the final episode of The Mary Tyler Moore Show (1977)

The show spun off three television series, all of which aired on CBS: the sitcoms Rhoda (1974–78) and Phyllis (1975–77), and the one-hour drama Lou Grant (1977–82). In 2000, Moore and Harper reprised their roles in a two-hour ABC TV-movie, Mary and Rhoda.

Two retrospective specials were produced by CBS: Mary Tyler Moore: The 20th Anniversary Show (1991) and The Mary Tyler Moore Reunion (2002). On May 19, 2008, the surviving cast members of The Mary Tyler Moore Show reunited on The Oprah Winfrey Show to reminisce about the series. Winfrey, a longtime admirer of Moore and the show, had her staff recreate the sets of the WJM-TV newsroom and Mary's apartment (seasons 1–5) for the reunion.

In 2013, the women of The Mary Tyler Moore Show – Cloris Leachman, Valerie Harper, Mary Tyler Moore, Betty White, and Georgia Engel – reunited on the TV Land sitcom Hot in Cleveland, which aired on September 4. Katie Couric interviewed the cast on Katie as they celebrated acting together for the first time in more than 30 years. It would be their final time on-screen together, as Mary Tyler Moore died in January 2017.

=== In popular culture ===
The show has remained popular since the final episode was broadcast in 1977. Several songs, films and other television programs reference or parody characters and events from the show, including the memorable "who can turn the world on with her smile" line from the title song. Parodies were done on shows such as Saturday Night Live, MadTV, and Mystery Science Theater 3000 (which was produced in Minneapolis). Musical artist Barbara Kessler and groups The Hold Steady and Relient K have all referred to the show in their songs.

The show has also been mentioned in film. In the Will Ferrell comedy film Anchorman: The Legend of Ron Burgundy, the name of Burgundy's dog, Baxter, refers to the character Ted Baxter, and the head of the newsroom staff is named Ed, honoring Ed Asner. In the 1997 film Romy & Michele's High School Reunion, the characters argue with each other while exclaiming "I'm the Mary and you're the Rhoda." Frank DeCaro of The New York Times wrote that this was the highlight of the film.

The show's Emmy-winning final episode has been alluded to many times in other series' closing episodes, such as the 1988 finale of St. Elsewhere (including the group shuffle to the tissue box).

== Broadcast history ==
=== United States ===
For most of its broadcasting run, the program was the lead-in for The Bob Newhart Show, which was also produced by MTM Enterprises.

==== Syndication ====
Contrary to initial expectation the show did not do well initially in syndication, never being shown in more than 25% of the United States at a time, according to Robert S. Alley, the co-author of a book about the series. In the fall of 1992, Nick at Nite began broadcasting the series nightly, launching it with a week-long "Mary-thon", and it became the network's top-rated series.

It is available on Hulu and through Pluto. It was a longtime staple of Weigel Broadcasting's MeTV network dating back to its 2003 launch in Chicago, expanding nationwide in 2011, but has since moved to Decades (now Catchy Comedy), partly owned by Weigel. It also made its debut on Up TV on September 22, 2025, airing weekday mornings from 10:00am–12:00pm ET.

=== United Kingdom ===
The series was broadcast on BBC1 from February 13, 1971, to December 29, 1972. The BBC broadcast the first 34 episodes before the series was dropped. Beginning in 1975, a number of ITV companies picked up the series. Channel 4 repeated the first 39 episodes between January 30, 1984, and August 23, 1985. The full series was repeated on The Family Channel from 1993 to 1996.

== Home media ==
The entire series was released on DVD in Region 1 by 20th Century Fox Home Entertainment between 2002 and 2010. Originally, season 1 was housed in a multi-panel fold-out digipak in a slipcase, while seasons 2-4 were issued in a slipcase, with each disc being housed in its own slim case. Starting with season 5, each season was issued in a standard 3-disc DVD keepcase, and seasons 1-4 were reissued in the same style of DVD packaging. The discs from each of these releases were repackaged in 2018 as a complete series set.

On the season 7 DVD, the last episode's "final curtain call", broadcast only once on March 19, 1977 (March 18 in Canada), was included at the request of fans. However, some of the season 7 sets did not include the curtain call; a replacement disc is reported to be available from the manufacturer.

== Critical response ==
On Rotten Tomatoes, season 1 holds an approval rating of 92% based on 12 reviews, with an average rating of 10.00/10. Critics consensus reads: "An exceptional ensemble and a smart sense of humor suggest, The Mary Tyler Moore Show and its titular star may just make it after all".

Early reviews in The New York Times characterized the show as “a preposterous item about life as an ‘associate producer’ in a TV newsroom,” but by 1973 the paper lauded its “consistently tight writing and good acting,” calling it “the best of its kind in the history of American television.

Lance Morrow wrote in Time before its last episode:

In many places around the U.S., the Mary Tyler Moore Show changed the nature of Saturday nights; it even became fashionable to spend them at home. The show turned the situation comedy into something like an art form—a slight art form perhaps, but a highly polished one. MTM was the sitcom that was intellectually respectable. The writing, acting and directing on MTM have been the best ever displayed in TV comedy. Owing much to Moore, who always set a tone of perfectionism, the show has been technically superb and beautifully paced. Former CBS Executive James Aubrey used to say, "The American public is something I fly over." But unlike 90% of TV's sitcoms, MTM has always transmitted intelligence, along with a rather unique respect for its characters and its audience. The snorting, hoorawing Archie Bunker's All in the Family has no such charm.

An NPR article reviewing the documentary Being Mary Tyler Moore described the series as “barrier-busting” and called it part of “the best night of television in television history,” alongside All in the Family, M*A*S*H, The Bob Newhart Show, and The Carol Burnett Show.

After Moore's death, The Guardian reflected on Mary and Rhoda's relationship, describing it as "the best portrait of friendship between women that American television has ever produced, full of laughter, wit and kindness."

== Awards and honors ==
=== Emmys ===
In addition to numerous nominations, The Mary Tyler Moore Show won 29 Emmy Awards. This was a record unbroken until Frasier earned its 30th in 2002.

=== Honors ===
- The show was honored with a Peabody Award in 1977. In presenting the award, the Peabody committee stated that MTM Enterprises had "established the benchmark by which all situation comedies must be judged" and lauded the show "for a consistent standard of excellence – and for a sympathetic portrayal of a career woman in today's changing society".
- The 1987 book Classic Sitcoms, by Vince Waldron, contains a poll among TV critics of the top sitcoms of all time up to that date. Mary Tyler Moore was the No. 1 show on that list.
- In 1997, TV Guide ranked "Chuckles Bites The Dust" No. 1 on its list of The 100 Greatest Episodes of All Time. "The Lars Affair" made the list at No. 27.
- In 1998, Entertainment Weekly placed The Mary Tyler Moore Show first in its list of the 100 Greatest TV Shows of all Time.
- In 1999, the TV Guide list of the 50 Greatest TV Characters of All Time ranked Mary Richards 21st and Ted Baxter 29th. Only three other shows placed two characters on the list (Taxi, The Honeymooners and Seinfeld).
- In 1999, Entertainment Weekly ranked the opening credits image of Mary tossing her hat into the air as No. 2 on its list of The 100 Greatest Moments In Television.
- In 2002, The Mary Tyler Moore Show was 11th on TV Guide's 50 Greatest TV Shows of All Time.
- In 2003, USA Today called it "one of the best shows ever to air on TV".
- In 2006, Entertainment Weekly ranked Rhoda 23rd on its list of the best sidekicks ever.
- In 2007, Time placed the Mary Tyler Moore Show on its unranked list of "100 Best TV Shows of All-TIME".
- Bravo ranked Mary Richards 8th, Lou Grant 35th, Ted Baxter 48th, and Rhoda Morgenstern 57th on its list of the 100 greatest TV characters.
- In 2013, the Writers Guild of America ranked The Mary Tyler Moore Show as the sixth best written TV series ever.
- Also in 2013, Entertainment Weekly ranked The Mary Tyler Moore Show as the fourth best TV series ever.
- In a third 2013 list, TV Guide ranked The Mary Tyler Moore Show as the seventh greatest show of all time.
- In 2022, Rolling Stone ranked The Mary Tyler Moore Show number ten on its list of the 100 greatest TV shows.
- In 2023, Variety ranked The Mary Tyler Moore Show #9 on its list of the 100 greatest TV shows of all time.
