= List of The Mary Tyler Moore Show characters =

The following is a list of featured characters on The Mary Tyler Moore Show.

== Main characters ==
=== Mary Richards ===
Mary Richards (Mary Tyler Moore) is a single native Minnesotan who moves to Minneapolis in 1970 at age 30 and becomes associate producer of WJM-TV's Six O'Clock News. Her sincere, kind demeanor often acts as a foil for the personalities of her co-workers and friends.

=== Lou Grant ===
Lou Grant (Edward Asner) is the producer (later executive producer) of the news. His tough, grumpy demeanor initially hides the kind-hearted nature gradually revealed as the series progresses. He is referred to as "Lou" by everyone, including Mary's friends, with the exception of Mary herself, who can rarely bring herself to call him by his first name rather than "Mr. Grant". He is married to Edie, but during the run of the show they separate and divorce.

=== Murray Slaughter ===
Murray Slaughter (Gavin MacLeod) is the head writer at fictional television station WJM-TV in Minneapolis, Minnesota. He is assigned to write the news stories for the station's nightly news broadcast, and makes frequent quips about Ted Baxter's mangling of his news copy, and Sue Ann Nivens' aggressive, man-hungry attitude. Murray and Mary are the only characters to appear in every episode of the series.

Murray is happily married to Marie (Joyce Bulifant) and has several daughters. In the show's later years, he and Marie adopt a Vietnamese son. Although a happy family man, Murray is forever in love with Mary Richards, who is, in his words, "absolutely terrific". He is protective of her and always concerned for her happiness and well-being. At one point, when Murray truly believes he is in love with Mary in a real way, Marie thinks he is going to leave the family. Mary explains to Marie that she thinks of Murray as a best friend, which helps things settle down.

In a season three episode, it is revealed that Murray is a compulsive gambler. When a snowstorm necessitates the cancellation of a Las Vegas getaway, Lou arranges a poker game which Murray reluctantly joins.

Murray tries to write a novel; despite failing, he never gives up.

Murray, along with Mary, Lou Grant, and putative nemesis Sue Ann Nivens are fired from WJM-TV to boost sagging news ratings. Ironically, Ted, the one most responsible for the dismal ratings, is retained.

=== Ted Baxter ===
Ted Baxter (Ted Knight) is the dim-witted, vain, and miserly anchorman of the Six O'Clock News. He frequently makes mistakes and is oblivious to the actual nature of the topics covered on the show but, to cover for tormenting insecurity, he postures as the country's best news journalist. He is often criticized by others, especially Murray and Lou, for his many shortcomings, but is never fired from his position. Initially a comic buffoon in the series, Ted's better nature is gradually revealed as the series unfolds, helped along by his sweet, seemingly vapid but frequently perceptive wife Georgette.

=== Rhoda Morgenstern ===
Rhoda Morgenstern (Valerie Harper) (1970–1974) (Season 1–4, 6 & 7 Guest) is Mary's best friend and upstairs neighbor. She works as a window dresser, first at the fictional Bloomfield's Department Store, and later at Hempel's Department Store. Though insecure about her appearance, she is also outgoing and sardonic, often making wisecracks, frequently at her own expense. Like Mary, Rhoda is single. She dates frequently, often joking about her disastrous dates. Rhoda moves to New York City and falls in love after the fourth season, leading to the spinoff series, Rhoda.

=== Phyllis Lindstrom ===
Phyllis Lindstrom (Cloris Leachman) (1970–1975) (Season 1–5, 7 Guest) is Mary's snobbish friend and neighbor. Phyllis is a recurring character appearing in many episodes of the first two seasons, after which her appearances decline in frequency. She is married to unseen character Lars, a dermatologist, and has a precocious daughter, Bess (Lisa Gerritsen). Phyllis is controlling, egotistical and often arrogant. She is actively involved in groups and clubs and is a political activist and a supporter of Women's Liberation. Rhoda and Phyllis are usually at odds and often trade insults. After appearing in three episodes of season five, Phyllis moves to spin-off Phyllis. In that series it is explained Phyllis has been widowed. Discovering that her husband had virtually no assets and that she must support herself, Phyllis returns to her home town of San Francisco.

=== Sue Ann Nivens ===
Sue Ann Nivens (Betty White) (1973–1977) (Season 4–7), is the host of WJM's The Happy Homemaker show. While her demeanor is superficially cheerful, she makes judgmental comments about Mary, exchanges personal insults with Murray, and uses many sexual double entendres, especially around Lou, to whom she is strongly attracted.

=== Georgette Franklin Baxter ===
Georgette Franklin Baxter is played by Georgia Engel. Georgette is the somewhat ditzy girlfriend (and later wife) of stentorian news anchor Ted Baxter (played by Ted Knight). Mary Tyler Moore described her as a cross between Stan Laurel and Marilyn Monroe. She and Mary get along fantastically, and she helps fill the void that Phyllis Lindstrom and Rhoda leave in Mary's life when they leave for San Francisco and New York City, respectively.

Georgette first appeared as a guest at one of Mary Richards' parties. She works as a window dresser at Hempel's Department Store in Minneapolis, Minnesota, along with Rhoda Morgenstern. Later, she works for a car rental service as a Golden Girl, and for Rhoda selling plants.

Georgette is devoted to Ted, and they eventually marry in Mary's apartment. They adopt a child named David (Robbie Rist), and later, Georgette gives birth to a girl named Mary Lou, also in Mary's apartment.

== Recurring characters ==
- Edie Grant (née McKenzie) (Priscilla Morrill) is married to Lou Grant. She and Lou have been married for many years and have children, but in the 1971 episode "The Boss Isn't Coming to Dinner", marital difficulties lead to Lou and Edie separating. Though they reunite by the end of the episode, they again separate during The Mary Tyler Moore Show's fourth season, with the marriage ending soon thereafter. In a later season, Edie is remarried to Howard Gordon, and asks Lou and Mary to attend her wedding. Lou holds his peace and they part friends. Even when Lou lives in Los Angeles, he and Edie keep in touch because their grown daughters remain a common bond between them. In the Lou Grant series, Edie is revealed to be Roman Catholic and of Ukrainian heritage.
- Gordon Howard, better known as Gordy, is played by actor John Amos. Gordy is the weather reporter on the nightly WJM-TV newscast. Affable, intelligent and professional, Gordy is the polar opposite of Ted. In 1973, Gordy leaves WJM, and eventually lands a job as host of a New York City talk show. Ted thinks this would be a great chance for him to become a national name, and wheedles Gordy to allow him to take part; but Gordy, although Ted's friend, is also wise to his ways, and gently refuses. After that, Gordy returns to New York and reaps success.

The producers introduced Gordy as a weatherman because of the dearth of black weathermen at that time. In several early episodes, the character of Gordy remarks, "Why does everyone think I'm the sportscaster?" Amos left the show for a starring role on Good Times. He later appeared as a guest star in an episode in 1977.

- Bess Lindstrom is portrayed on both The Mary Tyler Moore Show and Phyllis by actress Lisa Gerritsen. Bess is the daughter and only child of Phyllis Lindstrom and never-seen husband Lars. Bess helps her mother decorate the new apartment that Mary Richards moves into. Much to her mother's horror, Bess bonds well with Rhoda Morgenstern, calling her "Aunt Rhoda" (to which her mother invariably replies, "She's not your aunt"). Bess also bonds with Mary, an old friend of her mother's. She refers to Phyllis by her first name rather than with a motherly endearment.

Bess is featured more prominently on the spin-off show, Phyllis. By this time, Bess is in high school. She and her mother move to her mother's hometown, San Francisco, after her father Lars dies. While Bess' step great-grandmother "Mother Dexter" despises Phyllis, she gets along beautifully with Bess. Near the end of the series, Bess marries Mark Valenti (Craig Wasson), the nephew of Phyllis' boss, City Supervisor Carmen Valenti. In the final episode of the series, the couple are expecting a baby.

- Florence Meredith, best known as Aunt Flo (actually a distant older cousin of Mary Richards), is played on a recurring basis by actress Eileen Heckart. She is a straight-shooting newspaper columnist and winner of over sixteen journalism awards. She makes infrequent visits to Minneapolis and also battles Mary's boss, Lou Grant. Although Flo and Lou clash, there's a spark between them and they have a brief fling. Flo later makes an appearance on Lou Grant, covering the same political campaign as Tribune reporter Billie Newman.
- Martin and Ida Morgenstern are portrayed on both The Mary Tyler Moore Show and Rhoda by veteran actors Harold Gould and Nancy Walker, respectively. They are the parents of Rhoda Morgenstern. Ida is portrayed as a stereotypical overbearing Jewish mother, whereas Martin is somewhat calmer and more even-keeled. While Rhoda is living in Minneapolis, Ida occasionally visits. When Rhoda moves back to New York, she initially stays with her mother in the Bronx. During the run of Rhoda, Martin and Ida separate when Martin goes off to find himself, pursuing a long-shelved dream of becoming a lounge singer. Toward the end of Rhoda's run, Martin returns and attempts to win Ida back, though this remains unresolved when the series ends.
- Dottie and Walter Richards are Mary's parents. Dottie is played by veteran actress Nanette Fabray and Walter is played by Bill Quinn. Their first appearance is in 1972, two years after Mary leaves her fiancé and moved to Minneapolis. Her parents move to Minneapolis to be near Mary, though Mary and her mother, in particular, have a bit of trouble learning to relate to one another, now that Mary is an adult. The couple make a handful of appearances on the series that season before disappearing without explanation.
- Marie Slaughter is played by Joyce Bulifant. Marie is married to newswriter Murray Slaughter and a homemaker. She and Murray have three daughters; they adopt a Vietnamese son toward the end of the series.
- Joe Warner is played by actor Ted Bessell. He becomes Mary's boyfriend during season six, appearing in two episodes. Prior to appearing on Mary Tyler Moore, he is best known for portraying Donald Hollinger, Marlo Thomas' boyfriend on the sitcom That Girl.
- Bill, Mary's ex-boyfriend. A doctor, whom Mary dated throughout his med school and residency, after which he broke things off with her. He appears only in the pilot, in which he attempts to reestablish their relationship, and is played by Angus Duncan.
- Howard and Paul Arnell are brothers both played by actor Richard Schaal. Howard appears in several season one episodes as an old boyfriend of Mary's. She broke up with him because of his obsession with her and overall overbearing nature. He appears at Mary's high school reunion, and also attends an impromptu cocktail party thrown by Mary and Rhoda. Mary also briefly dates Howard's much more low-key brother Paul, whose company she enjoys a bit more, but Howard and Paul's parents (Mary Jackson and Henry Jones) seem to favor Howard, and feel that Mary is being disloyal by dating Paul.
- Andy Rivers is played by actor John Gabriel. Andy is WJM's sports reporter, hired by Mary. He appears in five episodes in seasons four and five. He occasionally dates Mary.
- Dan Whitfield is played by actor Michael Tolan. Dan teaches an evening journalism class that Mary and Rhoda enroll in. He occasionally dates Mary.
- Charlene McGuire is a lounge singer who occasionally dates Lou Grant. Charlene is played by Sheree North and in one episode by Janis Paige.
- Armond Lynton, played by Jack De Mave, is Rhoda's "date" (along with his wife Nancy) for an evening get-together accompanying Mary in the second episode of the series. He returns in the second season, recently divorced from Nancy, after responding to a chain letter sent by Mary.
- Pete is played by actor and cameraman J. Benjamin Chulay A.C.E. Pete is the blond-haired fellow in the background on certain episodes. He has small speaking appearances in two 1973-1974 episodes.
- Rayette is played by Beverly Sanders. She is a waitress in a restaurant where Mary occasionally has lunch.
