= Ted Baxter =

Fictional character from The Mary Tyler Moore Show

- First appearance: "Love Is All Around"; September 19, 1970
- Last appearance: "The Last Show"; March 19, 1977
- Created by: James L. Brooks and Allan Burns
- Portrayed by: Ted Knight

In-universe information
- Gender: Male
- Occupation: Anchorman at WJM-TV Station
- Family: Robert Baxter (father); Hal Baxter (brother)
- Spouse: Georgette Franklin Baxter
- Children: David (son); Mary Lou (daughter)

Ted Baxter is a fictional character on the sitcom The Mary Tyler Moore Show (1970–1977). Portrayed by Ted Knight, the Baxter character is a broad parody of a vain, shallow, buffoonish, vacuous TV personality. Knight's comedic model was actor William Powell, and he also drew on Los Angeles newscasters, including George Putnam, to shape the character. The role was originally conceived for Jack Cassidy, but Cassidy turned it down; he later appears in the season two episode "Cover Boy" as Ted's equally egocentric brother Hal. Ted Baxter has become a symbolic figure often referenced when criticizing media figures, particularly news anchors hired for style and appearance rather than journalistic ability.

== Character ==
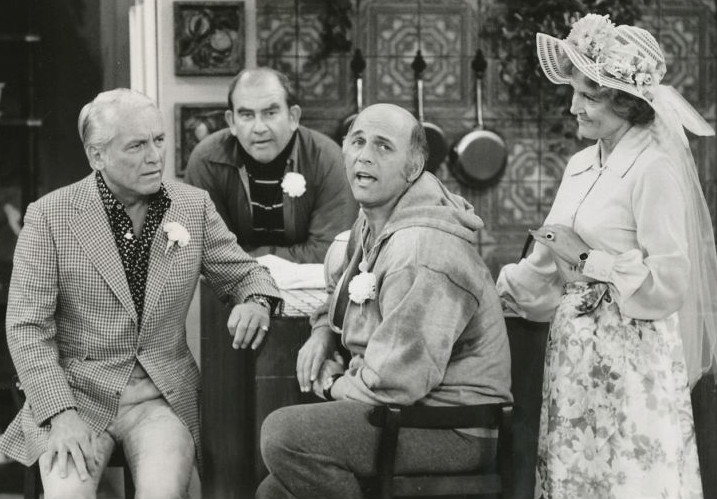
Ted and friends prepare for his wedding in Mary's kitchen, 1975.

Ted Baxter is the pompous and narcissistic nitwit anchorman at fictitious station WJM-TV in Minneapolis, Minnesota. Satirizing the affectations of news anchormen, the character speaks in a vocal fry register parody of the narrator of the Movietone News film reels shown in movie houses before the television era. While his narcissism fuels his delusions of grandeur, Baxter's onscreen performance is buffoonish. The character's incompetence is a running joke on Mary Tyler Moore, characterized by a steady stream of mispronunciations, malapropisms, and miscues. In constant fear of being fired, Baxter is, ironically, the only survivor of massive station layoffs in the series' final episode.

In the show's early seasons, Knight plays the character broadly for comic effect; he's a simpleton who mispronounces even the easiest words on camera. Knight gradually grew concerned that the show's writers were abusing the character and considered leaving the MTM cast. In response, the writers rounded out Knight's character, pairing him with love interest and eventual wife Georgette, played by Georgia Engel, who brings out some of Baxter's more lovable characteristics.

== Reception ==
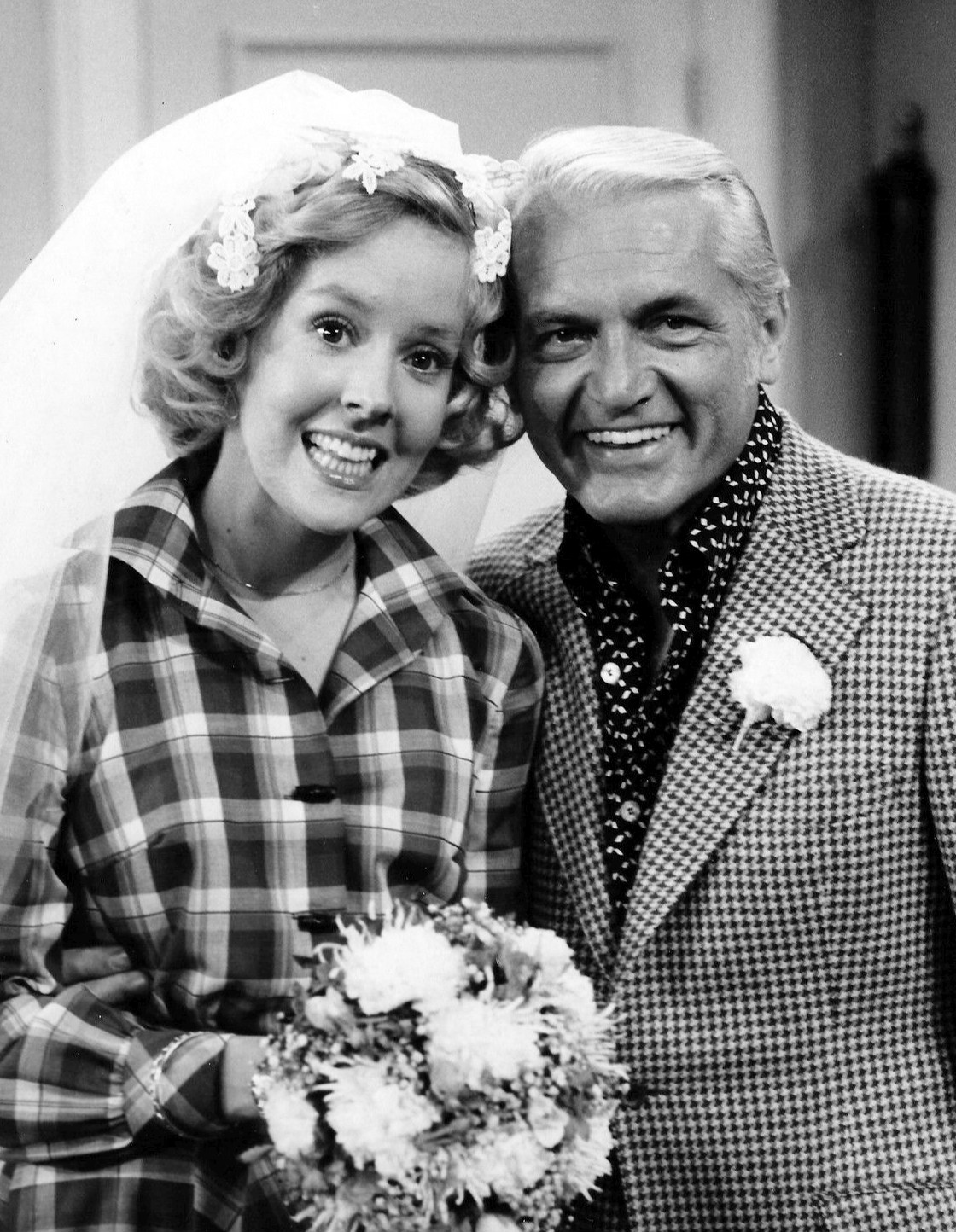
The wedding of Ted and Georgette, 1975.

Knight earned two Primetime Emmy Awards for his portrayal of Ted Baxter. Time magazine wrote that "Knight embodied a wonderful comic oaf: vain, inept and hilarious." Bravo ranked Ted Baxter 48th on their list of the 100 greatest TV characters.

== Allusions ==
=== In popular culture ===
Recurring anchorman character Kent Brockman on animated TV series The Simpsons is an homage to Ted Baxter. In Anchorman: The Legend of Ron Burgundy, Will Ferrell's newsman character has a dog named Baxter, one of the movie's many explicit and implicit references to the character. Popular Superman supporting character Steve Lombard is inspired by Ted Baxter. In the West Wing episode "18th and Potomac", C. J. Cregg evokes Ted Baxter to represent the epitome of a bad reporter. A character in the comedy-horror film Return of the Killer Tomatoes has a diploma from "The Ted Baxter School of Journalism". Steve Carell portrays smarmy, self-impressed anchorman Evan Baxter in Bruce Almighty. PBS children's program The Electric Company spoofs Ted Baxter with "Fred Baxter", a dimwitted news anchorman portrayed by Jim Boyd. A character in the "5/1" episode of The Newsroom is asked, "When did you turn into Ted Baxter?" in response to the character being high, missing an email from Vice President Joe Biden, and remaining nonchalant about it.

== See also ==
- Les Nessman
- News presenter
