= List of 1980s American television episodes with LGBTQ themes =

With the onset of the AIDS epidemic, American television episodes with LGBTQ themes sometimes featured LGBTQ characters, especially gay men, as a way for series to address the epidemic. Legal dramas like L.A. Law and Law & Order included euthanasia storylines centered on the deaths of gay men with AIDS. Sitcoms would occasionally broach the subject, but for the most part followed the pattern that had developed during the 1970s, with episodes following one of a handful of plot devices: a character close to a lead character would unexpectedly come out, forcing the characters to confront their own issues with homosexuality; a lead character is mistaken for gay; a lead character pretends to be gay; or, less frequently, a recurring character from the series comes out. In the first instance, it was rare that the gay character would ever make another appearance.

== Episodes ==
Year	Series	Network	Episode	Synopsis
1980	Archie Bunker's Place	CBS	"Archie Fixes Fred Up"	Archie (Carroll O'Connor) sets gay waiter Fred (Dean Scofield) up with a woman to try to straighten him out.
1980	The Associates	ABC	"The Censors"	A television producer (Stuart Margolin), the network censor (Lee Wallace) and attorney Tucker Kerwin (Martin Short) consult with a gay activist (Richard Brestoff) to see if the gay community would be offended by the line "queer as a three-dollar bill". The activist initially acts stereotypically effeminate and lisps when he tells them that the phrase is not offensive in context but, dropping the stereotypical mannerisms, chastises them for so readily accepting the stereotypes and challenges them to create non-stereotypical gay characters.
1980	Barney Miller	ABC	"The Child Stealers"	Gay father Darryl (Ray Stewart) kidnaps his son from a playground. Officer Zatelli comes out to the squad in response to bigoted comments from Darryl's ex-wife.
1980	CBS Reports	CBS	"Gay Power, Gay Politics"	Purportedly about the power of the gay movement in San Francisco, this episode was widely criticized for sensationally focusing on sex and violating journalistic ethics.
1980	Lou Grant	CBS	"Cover-Up"	A teacher (Andrew Rubin) at a private school is falsely accused of sexual misconduct with a male student. The teacher rejects support from gay rights organizations because it might be assumed that he is gay.
1980	The Love Boat	ABC	"Target Gopher/The Major's Wife/Strange Honeymoon/The Oilman Cometh"	A groom and his best man are mistaken for a honeymoon couple in the "Strange Honeymoon" segment.
1980	Speak Up, America!	NBC	"Lesbians Fighting to Stay in the Military"	
1980	Taxi	ABC	"Elaine's Strange Triangle"	Kirk (John David Carson), who Elaine (Marilu Henner) is interested in dating, has a crush on Tony (Tony Danza).
1980	Three's Company	ABC	"The Love Lesson"	Ralph Furley (Don Knotts) catches Jack making out with his date, Mr. Furley interprets this as a signal that Jack is trying to go straight, and offers to give him lessons to become a 'real man'.
1980	Vega$	ABC	"The Man Who Was Twice"	The death threats being made against female impersonator Jeremy Welles (Jim Bailey) are coming from Welles' second personality, "Martin".
1980	WKRP in Cincinnati	CBS	"Hotel Oceanview"	Herb (Frank Bonner) tries to seduce a potential client's assistant, Nikki (Linda Carlson). Nikki eventually tells Herb that she used to be Nick, his childhood friend.
1981	Barney Miller	ABC	"Movie: part 1"	Lieutenant Scanlon investigates a complaint that Wojohowicz (Max Gail) molested a male suspect. Wojohowicz outs Officer Zatelli. Series creator Danny Arnold worked closely with the National Gay Task Force to develop the Zatelli storyline.
1981	Lou Grant	CBS	"Venice"	Dennis (Daryl Anderson) tries to make sense of the unexplained suicide of a young woman at Venice Beach. Same-sex attraction might have been a motive.
1981	Trapper John, M.D.	CBS	"Straight and Narrow"	A police detective (Frank Martin) shoots and paralyzes San Francisco's first openly gay police officer (Joseph Cali) because he believes the police force is being "contaminated". Craig Russell plays Judy, a drag queen who cheers up a lonely older patient.
1982	American Playhouse	PBS	"Fifth of July"	Kenneth Talley Jr. (Richard Thomas) is a gay paraplegic Vietnam veteran who lives at his family home with boyfriend Jed Jenkins (Jeff Daniels). The episode was based on the play Fifth of July, by Lanford Wilson.
1982	Cagney & Lacey	CBS	"Conduct Unbecoming"	Cagney and Lacey's partner in uncovering an illegal handgun operation is accused of being gay after they discover his photograph in a gay magazine.
1982	Cheers	NBC	Sam's Woman	A former customer, Leo (Donnelly Rhodes), comes to the bar seeking advice from Gus, the former owner. When Leo hears that Gus is dead, he reluctantly turns to Coach for help. Leo's son, Ron, has not only come out to Leo as gay but also revealed that he is now engaged to an African-American man named Rick. Coach is indifferent and advises Leo to simply abandon Ron if he is "unhappy about it". However, Leo mistakes Coach's advice for deliberate reverse-psychology and leaves the bar as an accepting father.
1982	Dynasty	ABC	"The Two Princes"	Steven (Al Corley) comes out as gay to his family.
1982	Gimme a Break!	NBC	"The Chief's Gay Evening"	An anti-gay joke leads to one of the Chief's (Dolph Sweet) officers (Eugene Roche) coming out.
1982	Hill Street Blues	NBC	"Trial By Fury"	Belker (Bruce Weitz) befriends a gay prostitute named Eddie Gregg (Charles Levin).
1982	Hill Street Blues	NBC	"Phantom Of The Hill"	Eddie's (Charles Levin) lover is involved in a drug-related murder.
1982	Magnum, P.I.	CBS	"Jororo Kill"	Magnum (Tom Selleck) must prevent a man, discharged from the British armed forces for being a transvestite, from killing a visiting Prime Minister.
1982	Too Close for Comfort	ABC	"Monroe's Secret Love's Secret"	Monroe develops a crush on a cross-dresser, not realizing the woman he's in love is actually a man.
1983	American Playhouse	PBS	"Family Business"	Isiah Stern (Milton Berle) is a wealthy man who is dying and wants to make amends with each of his sons. Jerry (Jeff Marcus) is his youngest son who is also gay.
1983	Cheers	NBC	"The Boys in the Bar"	One of Sam's (Ted Danson) best friends (Alan Autry) comes out as gay in a new autobiography and some of the regulars worry that Cheers might turn into a gay bar.
1983	Diff'rent Strokes	NBC	"The Bicycle Man"	A police detective arrests the pedophile who was attempting to molest Arnold and one of his friends and clears up the misconception raised by Willis that the suspect was gay.
1983	Gimme a Break!	NBC	"Melissa"	Nell (Nell Carter) sets the Chief up with a woman (Victoria Carroll), not knowing that she is transgender.
1983	Hill Street Blues	NBC	"Here's Adventure, Here's Romance"	Following a deadly shooting at a gay bar, an off-duty cop, who is the only witness, is reluctant to come forward for fear that he'll be outed.
1983	Hotel	ABC	"Faith, Hope, and Charity"	Playwright Zan Elliott (Carol Lynley) invites old friend Eileen Weston (Barbara Parkins) to the premiere of her new play. Eileen is disturbed to learn that Zan is a lesbian but maintains the friendship.
1983	St. Elsewhere	NBC	"Release"	Dr. Craig's (William Daniels) college roommate (Andy Romano) is planning to have a sex change operation.
1983	St. Elsewhere	NBC	"AIDS and Comfort"	A Boston politician (Michael Brandon) checks into St. Eligius and learns that he has AIDS. He admits privately that he has had sexual encounters with men in the recent past. The first American medical drama to deal with the pandemic.
1983	Tony Brown's Journal	PBS	"Homosexuality Among Blacks"	
1983	Trapper John, M.D.	CBS	"Baby on the Line"	The parents of an infant diagnosed with congenital adrenal hyperplasia must decide whether to raise the child as a boy or a girl.
1984	Brothers	Showtime	"The Wedding"	On the day of his wedding, Cliff Waters (Paul Regina) decides to come out as gay, which does not sit well with his two older brothers, Joe (Robert Walden), an ex-professional football player who now owns a restaurant, and Lou (Brandon Maggart), a conservative working-class man, especially after meeting Cliff's best friend Donald Maltby (Philip Charles MacKenzie).
1984	Brothers	Showtime	"You Brought a New Kind of Love to Me"	Joe's ex-teammates, including Bubba (James Avery), jump to the wrong conclusion when they see Donald emerging from Joe's shower in a towel and frilly shower cap, and assume Joe is gay. Bubba later comes out to Joe and tells him that he has been attracted to him for some time.
1984	Brothers	Showtime	"Lizards Ain't Snakes"	In a state of confusion, Cliff attends a Gay No More meeting, and accompanies Donald to a gay bar.
1984	Brothers	Showtime	"Fools Russian"	Cliff's childhood hero, a wrestler named Ivan (Peter Palmer), newly out of the closet, falls for Lou.
1984	Brothers	Showtime	"It Only Hurts When I'm Gay"	Police indifference sends Joe, Lou and Donald undercover to catch the gay bashers who beat up Cliff at a local gay hangout.
1984	Brothers	Showtime	"The Stranger"	Joe hears that his pal Bubba has been in town for two weeks, and when he calls, Bubba acts distant. Joe questions him and learns that Bubba has AIDS. He tells Joe that there are funeral parlors that won`t even touch his dead body. When Donald hears the news, he blasts the lack of federal funds for research.
1984	Hotel	ABC	"Mistaken Identities"	A father (Steve Kanaly) fears his son (Lance Kerwin) is gay so he attempts to set him up with a female prostitute.
1984	Hotel	ABC	"Transitions"	Maggie Dawson (Deirdre Hall) catches her sportscaster husband (Robert Reed) in the arms of his director, Biff (Granville van Dusen).
1984	Oh Madeline	ABC	"Play Crystal for Me"	Madeline (Madeline Kahn) disguises herself as a flamboyant author so she can appear on a TV talk show with a competing romance novelist (Charles Ludlam), who is a man posing as a woman.
1984	Kate & Allie	CBS	"Odd Boy Out"	Chip's (Frederick Koehler) friends think he's a sissy because he lives in a house with two women.
1984	Kate & Allie	CBS	"Landlady"	Kate (Susan Saint James) and Allie (Jane Curtin) pretend to be a gay couple so that their landlady, who is gay and has a lover, will not increase their rent.
1984	The Love Boat	ABC	"Country Blues/A Matter of Taste/Frat Brothers Forever"	Doc's (Bernie Kopell) fraternity brother Buzz (Roy Thinnes) comes out to him in the "Frat Brothers Forever" segment.
1984	Murder, She Wrote	CBS	"Birds of a Feather"	Jessica (Angela Lansbury) travels to San Francisco to attend the wedding of her niece, Victoria, only to learn that her fiancé is doing drag at a nightclub to earn a living, and is subsequently charged with the murder of his boss. The fiancé is straight, as is the other drag queen.
1984	Night Court	NBC	"The Blizzard"	Dan (John Larroquette) is trapped in an elevator during an electrical outage with a gay man who is attracted to him.
1984	St. Elsewhere	NBC	"Girls Just Wanna Have Fun"	Dr. Cavanero (Cynthia Sikes) invites visiting medical researcher Christine Holtz (Caroline McWilliams) to stay with her, only to become uncomfortable when Holtz comes out to her. Cavanero violates Holtz's confidence by telling several members of the staff and berates her for being unnatural. She later apologizes.
1984	Too Close for Comfort	ABC	"Shipmates"	When Ted (Ted Knight) invites Frank (Gerald S. O'Loughlin), an old acquaintance from the Navy, to dinner, Frank agrees to bring "Carol", with whom he's been living for 25 years. "Carol" turns out to be Carroll (William Prince). Carroll dies (off-screen) by the end of the episode.
1985	American Playhouse	PBS	"Cat on a Hot Tin Roof"	Tommy Lee Jones plays Brick Pollitt, a former Southern football hero pining for his dead best friend Skipper.
1985	The Golden Girls	NBC	"The Engagement"	The girls have a gay live-in cook named Coco (Charles Levin), who was not retained in the regular series.
1985	Hill Street Blues	NBC	"Queen for a Day"	Officer Coffey (Ed Marinaro) is propositioned by his former high school football coach, Coach Beasley (James Tolkan), during a prostitution sting.
1985	Hotel	ABC	"Rallying Cry"	Guests Cameron (Lloyd Bochner) and Nora Wheeler (Marion Ross) sue for custody of their niece (Missy Francis) after learning that she has been left in the custody of a gay couple, Dr. Michael Vaughn (Douglas Barr) and Alex Halpern (Michael Sabatino).
1985	Miami Vice	NBC	"Evan"	Crockett (Don Johnson) and Tubbs (Philip Michael Thomas) join forces with the Federal Bureau of Alcohol, Tobacco and Firearms ... including Crockett's old partner and former friend, Evan Freed (William Russ). After Crockett rejects Freed's many attempts at rekindling the friendship, Tubbs tries to understand their troubled relationship. Crockett later confesses that years ago, both he and Freed had been best friends with a man named Mike Orgell. After admitting his homosexuality to his friends, Orgell faced serious harassment from Freed. The harassment from Freed became so bad that Orgell committed suicide. Crockett had not forgiven Freed and blamed him for the suicide. Later in the episode, Freed is revealed to have tremendous guilt over Orgell's suicide. Evan Freed is shot at the end of the episode and dies in the arms of Crockett, who has forgiven him.
1985	The New Alfred Hitchcock Presents	NBC	"An Unlocked Window"	A remake of a 1965 episode with Bruce Davison reprising the role of a transvestite nurse strangler originally played by T. C. Jones.
1985	Night Court	NBC	"Best of Friends"	Dan is upset when an old male friend (Jim Bailey) comes to visit after having become a woman.
1985	Trapper John, M.D.	CBS	"Friends and Lovers"	Nurse Libby (Lorna Luft) is crushed to discover an old boyfriend (Robert Desiderio) is both gay and suffering from AIDS. When Trapper (Pernell Roberts) learns that AIDS patients are being routinely transferred to another facility, he persuades the hospital to open an AIDS ward.
1986	The A-Team	NBC	"Cowboy George"	Boy George guest stars.
1986	Cagney & Lacey	CBS	"Rites Of Passage"	Tony Statinopolis (Barry Sattels), an openly gay man, moves in next door to Cagney (Sharon Gless) and the two become fast friends. Tony becomes a recurring character for the rest of the series.
1986	The Golden Girls	NBC	"Isn't It Romantic?"	Dorothy's (Beatrice Arthur) old friend Jean (Lois Nettleton), a lesbian whose partner has recently died, comes to visit and develops a crush on Rose (Betty White).
1986	Hill Street Blues	NBC	"Look Homeward, Ninja"	Officer Kate McBride (Lindsay Crouse) is falsely accused of sexually harassing a female suspect. While she is innocent of the charge, she does come out.
1986	Hill Street Blues	NBC	"Slum Enchanted Evening"	Sgt. Belker (Bruce Weitz) comes to the aid of his friend Eddie (Charles Levin), who is dying of AIDS.
1986	Hotel	ABC	"Scapegoats"	Homophobic bartender Frank (Ken Kercheval) believes he has contracted AIDS from gay waiter Joel (Leigh McCloskey), who is HIV-negative. Frank's ex-wife Sheila (Rita Taggart, assumes Frank is sleeping with men and his son Elliot (Doug Savant), assumes he is an IV drug user. He in fact was infected by a blood transfusion.
1986	Hotel	ABC	"Undercurrents"	Army officer Nick Hauser (Jan-Michael Vincent) learns that fellow officer Roger Gage (Boyd Gaines) is gay after Roger is bashed. The same gang later attacks Nick and bellhop Dave (Michael Spound) and Nick beats them. Nick is unable to accept Roger, who decides to come out and press charges even though he will lose his military career.
1986	Hunter	NBC	"From San Francisco With Love"	Hunter (Fred Dryer) figures out that detective Valerie Foster (Laura Johnson), investigating the murders of a millionaire and his son, actually plotted the murders with her lover Casey (Philece Sampler), the millionaire's wife.
1986	L.A. Law	NBC	"L.A. Law"	The firm discovers that their late senior partner was gay.
1986	L.A. Law	NBC	"The Venus Butterfly"	In "The Venus Butterfly" and "Fry Me to the Moon", Christopher Appleton (Peter Frechette) is a person with AIDS prosecuted by Grace Van Owen (Susan Dey) for the mercy-killing of his lover, who also had the disease. Stanley Kamel plays Appleton's gay attorney, Mark Gilliam, who would make several additional appearances.
1986	L.A. Law	NBC	"Fry Me to the Moon"	In "The Venus Butterfly" and "Fry Me to the Moon", Christopher Appleton (Peter Frechette) is a person with AIDS prosecuted by Grace Van Owen (Susan Dey) for the mercy-killing of his lover, who also had the disease. Stanley Kamel plays Appleton's gay attorney, Mark Gilliam, who would make several additional appearances.
1986	Matlock	NBC	"The Stripper"	In the final moments of the episode Matlock (Andy Griffith) tells the court that the mysterious and elusive murderer Helen Shelly is really a cross-dressing male strip club worker suffering from identity confusion.
1986	The Twilight Zone	CBS	"Dead Run"	Truck driver Johnny Davis (Steve Railsback) accepts the job of delivering souls to Hell. It turns out that Hell is run by corrupt, deceased human beings and God is not in the picture. Johnny discovers that many of the souls don't deserve to be there, with one of them for simply being gay.
1987	21 Jump Street	Fox	"Honor Bound"	The team investigates a military school where cadets are killing gays.
1987	CBS Schoolbreak Special	CBS	"What If I'm Gay?"	Todd (Richard Joseph Paul) comes out after his friends find a gay magazine in his desk. Todd confronts Kirk (Manfred Melcher) about Kirk's homophobia, which may be rooted in his own anxiety about his sexual orientation and the sexual experimentation he and Todd engaged in when younger.
1987	Designing Women	CBS	"Killing All the Right People"	Tony Goldwyn plays Kendall Dobbs, a gay man with AIDS who asks the Sugarbaker firm to design his funeral. Series creator Linda Bloodworth-Thomason wrote the script after her mother died of AIDS contracted via a blood transfusion. The episode's title is derived from a comment she overheard in the hospital: "The good thing about AIDS is that it's killing all the right people." She incorporated a version of the remark into the script. "Killing All the Right People" was nominated for two Emmy Awards, for writing and editing.
1987	Fame	NBC, then Syndicated	"Best Buddies"	Danny's (Carlo Imperato) best friend comes out.
1987	Frank's Place	CBS	"Season's Greetings"	"Bubba" Weisburger (Robert Harper), longtime friend of Frank (Tim Reid), tells his mother that Frank is his lover in an effort to stop her nagging questions about when he is going to marry and settle down.
1987	The Golden Girls	NBC	"Strange Bedfellows"	Blanche (Rue McClanahan) is caught up in a scandal with a politician (John Schuck), who used to be a woman.
1987	Leg Work	CBS	"Life Itself"	Claire McCarron (Margaret Colin) helps a friend of hers, who has contracted AIDS, find his former lover as a dying wish.
1987	Miami Vice	NBC	"God's Work"	Felipe Cruz (Esai Morales), son of drug kingpin Jorge Cruz (Alfonso Arau) returns to Miami, apparently to be a part of his father's business. He also holds a personal secret that he is gay, which he had realized when he was 12, causing him to cry himself to sleep out of fear of being a disappointment to his father. He had confided in his maternal uncle Ernesto Lupe (Daniel Lugo), a priest who also ran an AIDS hospice, and it is revealed that he instead came back to assist with his uncle's hospice, not to follow in his father's footsteps. His former lover Louie Garcia (Juan Cejas) is being treated in Ernesto's clinic for AIDS, where he later succumbs to it. Jorge had killed Ernesto, disapproving of his business and being convinced that he had turned Felipe gay. At the end of the episode, Jorge is arrested and Felipe promises to keep his uncle's hospice open.
1987	Nine to Five	ABC	"One Of The Girls"	Bud (Edward Winter) learns that his college girlfriend Liz (Gail Strickland), is dating another woman, Chris (Hilary Thompson).
1988	21 Jump Street	Fox	"A Big Disease with a Little Name"	The team protects a high school student, Harley Poolish (Philip Tanzini), living with AIDS. He initially claims he is a hemophiliac who contracted the disease through contaminated blood products but eventually acknowledges that he is gay and the hemophilia story is a lie.
1988	The Bronx Zoo	NBC	"Crossroads"	Teacher Harry Barnes (David Wilson) learns that a student who is engaged to be married is secretly gay; Harry plans to out him to his fiancée.
1988	Cheers	NBC	"Norm, Is That You?"	On the recommendation of Frasier (Kelsey Grammer) and Lilith (Bebe Neuwirth), part-time house painter Norm (George Wendt) is hired as an interior decorator by a shallow yuppie couple, Robert and Kim Cooperman, (Jane Sibbett and George DelHoyo). Since the couple is convinced that all the best decorators are gay, Norm decides to put on a flamboyant act to prepare for the new job.
1988	The Golden Girls	NBC	"Scared Straight"	Blanche's younger brother Clayton (Monte Markham) comes out as gay on a visit to Miami.
1988	Hotel	ABC	"Contest of Wills"	Joanne Lambert is killed in a car accident. When her father (Dick O'Neill) arrives to claim her body he learns that she had been living with hotel catering manager Carol Bowman (Christopher Norris). Although he is initially hostile to her, the two bond and Carol accompanies him home for Joanne's funeral.
1988	Midnight Caller	NBC	"After It Happened"	Bisexual Mike Barnes (Richard Cox) deliberately infects Tina (Kay Lenz) (the ex-girlfriend of radio host Jack Killian (Gary Cole)) with HIV. Russ (J. D. Lewis) is Mike's ex-boyfriend who Mike abandoned when Russ got sick. Gay and AIDS activists protested during and after filming. Then-NBC affiliate KRON-TV in San Francisco ran a disclaimer before the show with an AIDS hotline number and aired a half-hour live special, Midnight Caller: The Response during which activists and public health officials aired their grievances.
1989	American Masters	PBS	"James Baldwin: The Price of the Ticket"	This episode explored the life of James Baldwin, the openly gay writer.
1989	China Beach	ABC	"China Men"	Boonie (Brian Wimmer) develops feelings for a woman who used to be a man.
1989	Dear John	NBC	"Stand By Your Man"	Tony (Cleavon Little) develops a crush on John (Judd Hirsch) and when John tries to let him down easy Tony makes a scene at a restaurant.
1989	Dear John	NBC	"Margo"	The group tells John that the knockout who's knocking him out is really a new member's, Sylvia (Annie Golden), transvestite husband, Margo/Frank (Shannon Tweed).
1989	Doctor, Doctor	CBS	"Torch Song Cardiology"	Mike's (Matt Frewer) gay brother Richard (Tony Carreiro) helps Grant (Beau Gravitte) write a speech and the two become close friends, prompting some homophobia from Mike, Deirdre (Maureen Mueller) and Abe (Julius Carry III).
1989	Doogie Howser, M.D.	ABC	"Vinnie, Video, Vici"	A gay artist, dying of AIDS, paints a mural in the hospital.
1989	Hunter	NBC	"The Fifth Victim"	The search for a serial killer of gay men leads to the knowledge that the supposed fifth victim was actually a copycat. Detective Frank Buchanan (Rick Giolito) comes out during the investigation.
1989	L.A. Law	NBC	"The Accidental Jurist"	Kuzack (Harry Hamlin) chooses a retired judge (Donald Moffat) whom he knows is secretly gay to hear the case of an athlete (Brian McNamara) who loses an endorsement deal after coming out.
1989	Night Court	NBC	"Passion Plundered"	Harry (Harry Anderson) and Dan pursue a reporter sent to interview Harry, only to find out she is a lesbian.
1989	Thirtysomething	ABC	"Trust Me"	Melissa (Melanie Mayron) becomes fast friends with Russell (David Marshall Grant), who is gay, after meeting him at a wedding.
1989	Thirtysomething	ABC	"Strangers"	Russell (David Marshall Grant) and Peter (Peter Frechette) are seen in bed together after having had sex. Peter works for the same advertising agency as Melissa's cousin, Michael (Ken Olin). The actors were not allowed to touch during the scene and the episode generated controversy and alienated advertisers.

== See also ==
- List of pre-Stonewall American television episodes with LGBT themes
- List of 1970s American television episodes with LGBT themes
- List of American television episodes with LGBT themes, 1990–1997
- Lists of television programs with LGBT characters
