= For Richer, for Poorer (film) =

- Genre: Comedy
- Written by: Stan Daniels
- Directed by: Jay Sandrich
- Starring: Jack Lemmon; Talia Shire; Jonathan Silverman
- Music by: Miles Goodman
- Country of origin: United States
- Original language: English

Production
- Executive producer: David R. Ginsburg
- Producer: Richard M. Rosenbloom
- Cinematography: Arthur Albert
- Editor: Skip Schoolnik
- Running time: 90 minutes
- Production companies: Citadel Entertainment; HBO Pictures

Original release
- Network: HBO
- Release: February 29, 1992

For Richer, for Poorer is a 1992 American made-for-television comedy film directed by Jay Sandrich. The HBO original film, starring Jack Lemmon, Talia Shire, Jonathan Silverman and Madeline Kahn, was released on VHS with the title Father, Son and the Mistress.

== Plot ==
Aram Katourian (Jack Lemmon) is atop a bridge considering whether to jump to his death when a homeless woman (Madeline Kahn) -- fascinated by seeing a person die—interrupts him. He finally does not have the courage to commit suicide, and instead tells the woman his story:

Aram is a self-made millionaire who owns twelve successful stores and makes an average of 3.2 million dollars a year. He married his greedy high school sweetheart Millie (Shire) and have an adult son, Michael (Silverman). When he is not spying on his staff, he spends his time with his mistress, Irene (Joanna Gleason).

Realizing that his son has no intention of building a career for himself, due to money always being available to him, Aram decides to sell his business and give all of his money away to random strangers on the street. He is enthusiastic when Michael assures him that their economical future will be just fine, but upset when he later finds out that Michael meant that he has no doubt that his father will find another job.

Millie stands by Aram's side and becomes a housekeeper to earn some money. Aram also takes on a few tasks, but Michael quits his job after the first twenty minutes due to a fight with his boss. Aram, fearing that he will never inspire his son to come off the couch from watching television, suddenly has a great idea: He and Michael will join forces to make travel videos. The business would combine Michael's love for TV and luxury travel. Aram soon finds his travel video concept already exists.

Seeing no other options, Aram purposely gets into a car accident to inspire Michael to feel some responsibility for the family. Michael promptly becomes engaged to a wealthy girlfriend from the past who has recently inherited all of her father's money. Aram, fed up with his son's spoiled behavior, confronts Michael with his lack of responsibility, ordering him to get out of his life.

With his son gone, and Millie working as a maid, Aram starts to regret his decisions. He tapes a video in which he admits that his bankruptcy was faked. He then goes to the bridge, where he runs into the homeless woman. Billie, who lives in poverty but is still optimistic about life, inspires Aram to not kill himself. They part ways after she admits that she was one of the people who Aram gave his money to.

Two years later, Millie, now owner of a bakery, is still upset by his abandonment when Aram contacts her. She reveals that she never accepted any of Michael's money, and instead contacted Irene (she knew about the affair) to open their own shop. Aram offers to end their marriage formally, though Millie remains suspicious.

Aram finds out that his son has recently divorced, but received a lot of money during the settlement. Michael nevertheless decided to work as a waiter to earn some honest money. Aram is initially disgusted by his son doing such a menial job, then feels proud when he learns about his motives. The family eventually reconciles, and Aram now manages Michael's settlement money.

== Cast ==
- Jack Lemmon as Aram Katourian
- Talia Shire as Millie Katourian
- Jonathan Silverman as Michael Katourian
- Joanna Gleason as Irene
- Madeline Kahn as Billie
- George Wyner as Harry
- Dakin Matthews as Larry
- Stephen Caffrey as Mark
