= Bogy-Chenault, Kentucky =

Unincorporated community in Kentucky, United States

- Unincorporated community
- Location within Kentucky Location within the United States
- Coordinates: 38°00′40″N 83°56′59″W
- Country: United States
- State: Kentucky
- County: Montgomery
- Elevation: 1,010 ft (310 m)
- Time zone: UTC-5 (Eastern (EST))
  - Summer (DST): UTC-4 (EDT)
- GNIS feature ID: 2491584

Bogy-Chenault is an unincorporated community within Montgomery County, Kentucky, United States.

== Notable people ==
Actor Tom Willett was born in Chenault in 1938.
