= List of Dear John episodes =

Dear John is an American sitcom that aired on NBC. It was based on the 1986–87 British sitcom of the same name that aired on the BBC. It ran for four seasons from 1988 to 1992 and aired a total of 85 episodes.

== Series overview ==
Season	Episodes	Originally released		Rank	Rating
Season	Episodes	First released	Last released	Rank	Rating
1	22	October 6, 1988	May 11, 1989	11	18.5
2	24	September 28, 1989	May 16, 1990	17	17.2
3	22	September 19, 1990	May 1, 1991	50	—N/a
4	22	September 19, 1991	July 22, 1992	77	—N/a

== Episodes ==
=== Season 1 (1988–89) ===
No. overall	No. in season	Title	Directed by	Written by	Original release date	Viewers (millions)
1	1	"Pilot"	James Burrows	Teleplay by : Bob Ellison & Peter Noah	October 6, 1988	28.1
Recently divorced John Lacey joins a singles group. Based on the pilot for the original series by John Sullivan.
2	2	"Ralph's Curse"	James Burrows	John Sullivan	October 27, 1988	27.5
Ralph believes he's fallen victim to a curse that's plagued his family for generations.
3	3	"Hello, Goodbye"	Beth Hillshafer	Dave Hackel	November 3, 1988	23.1
A young man (Lonny Price) arrives at John's door claiming to be his son.
4	4	"The Younger Girl"	James Gardner	John Sullivan	November 10, 1988	26.8
A young woman (Jennifer Runyon) becomes interested in John.
5	5	"Matthew's Dilemma"	Art Wolff	John Sullivan	November 17, 1988	25.2
John's son, Matthew (Ben Savage), seems hesitant to spend time with him.
6	6	"Dear Mike"	Stan Daniels	Bruce Helford	November 24, 1988	24.7
John's friend, Mike (Sam McMurray), who stole Wendy and their house, is apparently rejected.
7	7	"Politics as Usual"	Stan Daniels	Gina Goldman	December 1, 1988	26.6
A political candidate invites John to a private party.
8	8	"Dancing in the Dark"	Arlene Sanford	Teleplay by : Gina Goldman	December 15, 1988	27.5
John spends Christmas with his fellow members of One-Two-One when Matthew goes to Disney World for the holidays. Based on an episode written by John Sullivan for the original series.
9	9	"Was It Good for Me?"	Stan Daniels	Teleplay by : Dave Hackel	January 5, 1989	30.1
Kate offers to sleep with John. Based on an episode written by John Sullivan for the original series.
10	10	"Honest John"	Tony Singletary	John Sullivan	January 12, 1989	30.9
Wendy wants John to pretend they're still married so Matthew will be accepted into a Catholic school.
11	11	"The Return of Ricky"	Michael Karm	John Sullivan	January 19, 1989	27.7
The gang plans a '60s nostalgia benefit for Rick. Features a guest appearance by the British Invasion group Freddie and the Dreamers.
12	12	"Dream Babe"	Matthew Diamond	Alan Kirschenbaum	January 26, 1989	27.4
Kirk's girlfriend doesn't understand English.
13	13	"Stand by Your Man"	Noam Pitlik	Dave Hackel	February 16, 1989	27.0
A new member, (Cleavon Little), whose marriage failed because of his being gay, falls for John.
14	14	"Love and Marriage"	Stan Daniels	Peter Noah	February 23, 1989	28.8
Louise is surprised by the reaction of her unborn baby's father (Woody Harrelson) when she tells him.
15	15	"For a Friend"	Stan Daniels	Teleplay by : Alan Kirschenbaum	March 2, 1989	28.2
John's friend, Gary (Gerrit Graham), joins the group and lies about his wife being dead. Based on an episode written by John Sullivan for the original series.
16	16	"The Second Time Around"	Art Wolff	Wayne Terwilliger	March 9, 1989	27.6
John has a date with a woman he hadn't seen in 30 years (Gwen Verdon).
17	17	"The Last Dance"	John Rich	Bob Stevens	March 16, 1989	27.0
The group helps Ralph talk to a woman he's been too nervous to ask out.
18	18	"Sisters"	John Rich	Dave Hackel	March 30, 1989	28.4
Kate dates Kirk to prove her sister (Wendy Schaal) always steals her boyfriends.
19	19	"Gone Camping"	John Rich	Story by : John Sullivan & Alan Kirschenbaum & Bob Stevens; Teleplay by : Alan Kirschenbaum & Bob Stevens	April 6, 1989	27.0
John and Matthew go camping, only to be trapped in a cabin when a snowstorm hits.
20	20	"Margo"	John Rich	Gina Goldman	April 27, 1989	25.3
John is informed by the group that the woman he just met (Shannon Tweed) is a new member(Annie Golden)'s transvestite husband.
21	21	"Friend and Lovers"	John Rich	John Sullivan	May 4, 1989	26.3
A friend's troubled marriage jeopardizes John's plans for a romantic evening.
22	22	"Bound for Gloria"	Matthew Diamond	Bob Stevens	May 11, 1989	23.4
Kirk dates a young widow brought in by John.

=== Season 2 (1989–90) ===
No. overall	No. in season	Title	Directed by	Written by	Original release date	Viewers (millions)
23	1	"A New Leash on Life"	Hal Cooper	Alan Kirschenbaum	September 28, 1989	29.5
John finds a lost dog.
24	2	"The Other Group"	Hal Cooper	Mark Reisman and Jeremy Stevens	October 12, 1989	26.8
John finds a support group that looks on the bright side of divorce.
25	3	"Ralph's Second Chance"	Hal Cooper	Mike Milligan and Jay Moriarty	October 19, 1989	29.6
The woman who left Ralph at their wedding reception (Susan Kellermann) returns to give him another chance.
26	4	"John's Blind Date"	Hal Cooper	Story by : Rod Parker and Bob Ellison; Teleplay by : Alan Kirschenbaum	November 2, 1989	31.1
John has a blind date with a flight attendant (Jan Hooks) who wants to spend the rest of her life with him.
27	5	"The Secret of Success"	Hal Cooper	Rick Hawkins	November 9, 1989	29.1
John is reluctant to use Ralph's book about positivity to get his poetry published.
28	6	"The British Are Coming"	Hal Cooper	Marco Pennette	November 16, 1989	29.1
Louise gets more than she bargained for when she tries to present herself as married to her strict father (Clive Revill).
29	7	"Something on the Side" "Mike's Other Girl"	Hal Cooper	Rod Burton	November 23, 1989	24.9
John catches Wendy's new husband with another woman.
30	8	"Fathers Know Best"	Hal Cooper	Maxine Lapiduss	November 30, 1989	30.8
John doesn't like Kate going out with his father (Stephen Elliott).
31	9	"The Dilemma with Emma"	Hal Cooper	Marco Pennette	December 7, 1989	29.8
John regrets a promise he made to his uncle that he would take care of his Aunt Emma (Elizabeth Franz), who constantly complains about her cardiac condition.
32	10	"Kate, a Date and Fate"	Hal Cooper	Jay Moriarty and Mike Milligan	December 21, 1989	29.6
John sets Kate up with an old fraternity friend (Jeffrey DeMunn).
33	11	"Honolulu Baby"	Hal Cooper	Mark Reisman and Jeremy Stevens	January 4, 1990	29.9
At her 60th high-school reunion, Mrs. Philbert sees her ex-best friend (Jeanette Nolan) who stole her fiance two days before her wedding.
34	12	"Breaking Up Is Hard to Do"	Hal Cooper	Story by : Sandy Helberg & Harriet B. Helberg; Teleplay by : Rod Burton	January 11, 1990	27.8
John dates a woman whose daughter thinks her mother's dates are grown-up dweebs.
35	13	"Kirk's Problem"	Hal Cooper	Efrem Seeger	January 17, 1990	20.3
An attractive newcomer gives Kirk a problem. Debut of Susan Walters as Mary Beth Sutton.
36	14	"John's Friend"	Hal Cooper	Efrem Seeger	January 24, 1990	23.2
On a free ski weekend with Kirk, John befriends a fellow Sherlock Holmes fan (Gordon Clapp).
37	15	"Unwelcome to the Club"	Hal Cooper	Rick Hawkins	February 7, 1990	19.0
An ex-con who has a problem with being rejected asks to join the group.
38	16	"Some Nights to Remember"	Hal Cooper	Marco Pennette	February 12, 1990	23.3
The group remembers all the good times they've spent at a restaurant about to close, especially John, who visited the place not long after Wendy left him.
39	17	"John's New Job: Part 1"	Hal Cooper	Larry Balmagia	February 14, 1990	17.9
John looks for a job so he can make money to send Matthew to Europe for a soccer tournament.
40	18	"John's New Job: Part 2"	Hal Cooper	Larry Balmagia	February 21, 1990	16.2
John enjoys his job as a book editor, but isn't very happy to be his boss' boy toy.
41	19	"Babyface"	Hal Cooper	Mark Reisman and Jeremy Stevens	February 28, 1990	20.2
Louise leaves Nigel in the care of John, Kirk, and Ralph.
42	20	"John's Night Out"	Hal Cooper	Mike Milligan and Jay Moriarty	March 7, 1990	18.2
John takes a night off from the group.
43	21	"True Confessions"	Hal Cooper	Rod Burton	March 14, 1990	17.0
The group plans a surprise birthday for Kirk, only to be surprised themselves.
44	22	"To John, with Love"	Hal Cooper	Story by : Ron Burla; Teleplay by : Efrem Seeger	May 2, 1990	19.5
Mary Beth loves John for helping her write an article.
45	23	"Aunt Red"	Hal Cooper	Marco Pennette	May 9, 1990	17.0
John assures Kate that her nephew can trust any guy she dates, but he doesn't expect Kirk to be trusted.
46	24	"No More Mr. Nice Guy"	Hal Cooper	Larry Balmagia	May 16, 1990	18.7
John stands up to Mr. Milquetoast.

=== Season 3 (1990–91) ===
No. overall	No. in season	Title	Directed by	Written by	Original release date	Viewers (millions)
47	1	"Pretty Man"	Hal Cooper	Diana Ayers and Susan Sebastian	September 19, 1990	15.7
John and Kirk go on a double blind date, where John finds himself mistaken for a professional escort.
48	2	"And Baby Makes Four: Part 1"	Hal Cooper	Mike Milligan and Jay Moriarty	September 26, 1990	14.6
Wendy wants John to give her another baby.
49	3	"And Baby Makes Four: Part 2"	Hal Cooper	Mike Milligan and Jay Moriarty	October 3, 1990	16.2
John has second thoughts about having another baby with Wendy.
50	4	"A Priest's Story"	Hal Cooper	Howard Meyers	October 10, 1990	19.7
Kirk's brother (Kevin Dunn), who's now a priest, wants to reconcile before he leaves for Rome.
51	5	"That's Big of Me"	Hal Cooper	Rod Burton	October 24, 1990	16.6
Louise and Kate fall for a divorce photographer (Doug Sheehan), while John has his first workout in years.
52	6	"Hot Lips Lacey"	Hal Cooper	Marco Pennette	October 31, 1990	13.9
John takes six weeks of clarinet lessons to play at Carnegie Hall.
53	7	"Hole in One"	Hal Cooper	Mark Reisman and Jeremy Stevens	November 7, 1990	16.9
John goes with Kate to her aunt's funeral so she won't be tempted to off her ex-husband (Corbin Bernsen).
54	8	"The Blunder Years"	Hal Cooper	Diana Ayers and Susan Sebastian	November 14, 1990	16.3
John remembers the first love he let get away when she comes to town.
55	9	"Down and Out in Rego Park"	Hal Cooper	Howard Meyers	November 28, 1990	15.8
Mary Beth reupholsters a chair to cover for an unexpected rejection.
56	10	"Homeward Bound"	Hal Cooper	Mike Milligan and Jay Moriarty	December 12, 1990	16.2
John wants his mother (Nina Foch) to move in with him rather than move into a rest home.
57	11	"Matter of Trust"	Hal Cooper	Efrem Seeger	December 19, 1990	17.7
58	12	"Matter of Trust"	Hal Cooper	Efrem Seeger	December 19, 1990	17.7
John is in danger of losing his job when a tabloid gets word that he's the latest boyfriend of a sex-addicted actress (Robin Strasser).
59	13	"Molly and Me"	Hal Cooper	Diana Ayers and Susan Sebastian	January 5, 1991	19.3
Ralph's romance with his coworker (Megan Mullally) is complicated because she's married.
60	14	"Love Stories: Part 1"	Hal Cooper	Rod Parker, Bob Ellison and Rod Burton	January 19, 1991	16.4
Kirk, Kate, and John respectively fall in love with a SmokEnder, a cattleman (Lorenzo Lamas), and a periodontist (DeLane Matthews).
61	15	"Love Stories: Part 2"	Hal Cooper	Bob Ellison, Rod Burton and Rod Parker	January 26, 1991	18.2
Louise falls in love with her auditor (Lane Davies) as Kirk's own love story continues.
62	16	"Love Stories: Part 3"	Hal Cooper	Rod Burton, Rod Parker and Bob Ellison	February 2, 1991	17.1
The group's love stories reach their conclusions.
63	17	"John and Kirk's Excellent Adventure"	Hal Cooper	Marco Pennette	February 9, 1991	16.6
A woman (Lela Ivey) steals an antique gold watch the group was getting fixed as a birthday present for John.
64	18	"The Poet: Part 1"	Hal Cooper	Howard Meyers	February 16, 1991	17.5
John takes a poetry class in college.
65	19	"The Poet: Part 2"	Hal Cooper	Howard Meyers	March 2, 1991	15.9
John must decide what to do when he finds out his poetry teacher (George Hearn) is taking credit for his poems.
66	20	"Louise, the Hero"	Hal Cooper	Mike Milligan and Jay Moriarty	March 13, 1991	16.8
Louise claims she can raise funds for the community center from a munchkin and a tattooed lady.
67	21	"Matthew and the Baby"	Hal Cooper	Meredith Siler	March 20, 1991	16.6
Matthew reacts badly to John and Wendy having another baby, while Kirk and Denise use the group to start a catering service.
68	22	"John's Week Off"	Hal Cooper	Rod Burton	May 1, 1991	16.8
John spends the week getting taken off planes due to Kirk's discount ticket and Kate's wealthy suitor begs her to marry him.

=== Season 4 (1991–92) ===
No. overall	No. in season	Title	Directed by	Written by	Original release date	Viewers (millions)
69	1	"Brothers"	Hal Cooper	Rod Burton	September 19, 1991	15.5
John faces the possibility that Kirk could be his brother.
70	2	"Kirk's Ex-Wife"	Hal Cooper	Marco Pennette	September 20, 1991	9.6
The group learns why Kirk's ex-wife left him.
71	3	"Kate's Cop"	Hal Cooper	Shelley Zellman	September 27, 1991	9.7
A cop investigating a robbery asks Kate out on a date.
72	4	"Whose Soap Opera Is It Anyway?"	Hal Cooper	Marco Pennette	October 4, 1991	7.7
Mary Beth is happy to get a job writing for a soap opera - until she learns the reason.
73	5	"Hello, Annie"	Hal Cooper	Rod Parker and Bob Ellison	October 25, 1991	10.0
Kirk sublets his dream apartment from a guy whose friend refuses to leave.
74	6	"Lust and Death"	Hal Cooper	Howard Meyers	November 8, 1991	10.6
Kirk sleeps with a woman whose brothers threaten to hurt him unless he marries her.
75	7	"The Bachelor Shower"	Hal Cooper	Cynthia Heimel	November 15, 1991	11.5
Kate has a bridal shower that doesn't go so well, while Mitch has a bachelor party that's no better, especially when he arrests the host - John.
76	8	"I Do, Baby"	Hal Cooper	Rod Burton	December 13, 1991	11.1
77	9	"I Do, Baby"	Hal Cooper	Rod Burton	December 13, 1991	11.1
Kirk shows up at Kate's wedding and tries to talk her into calling it off. Wendy also arrives to show John her pregnancy, and then goes into labor.
78	10	"Once I Had a Secret Love"	Hal Cooper	Shelley Zellman	December 20, 1991	10.7
After insisting that everyone tell a secret, Louise confesses to having an affair with Ben.
79	11	"'Twas the Fight Before Christmas"	Hal Cooper	Marco Pennette and John Rajeski	December 27, 1991	11.2
John hires a Santa Claus for the day care center who has a problem with children.
80	12	"Do the Wrong Thing"	Hal Cooper	Michael Poryes	January 3, 1992	12.7
John has to choose which of his two dates he'll take to a Broadway show.
81	13	"The Big Payday"	Hal Cooper	Kim Weiskopf	April 1, 1992	16.3
The group is offered a real-estate deal by a former con man claiming to have gone straight.
82	14	"John's Divididend Heart"	Hal Cooper	Bud Wiser	April 15, 1992	16.1
Mary Beth creates a character based on John for her soap opera.
83	15	"Who's Who"	Hal Cooper	Jack LoGiudice	June 12, 1992	5.2
Kirk is interested in one of John's female literacy students (Kristen Cloke).
84	16	"Poor John: Part 1"	Hal Cooper	Rod Burton	July 15, 1992	12.2
John tries to get his funds straightened out so he and Jennifer can spend a weekend on the slopes.
85	17	"Poor John: Part 2"	Hal Cooper	Rod Burton	July 22, 1992	10.5
John considers filing for bankruptcy.
86	18	"The Write Stuff"	Hal Cooper	John Rajeski	June 28, 1992	N/A
John tries to write scripts for Mary Beth's soap opera.
87	19	"Heartburn and Heartache"	Hal Cooper	Eric Pomerance	June 7, 1992	9.0
A doctor connects John's stomach problems to Kirk.
88	20	"Adult Education"	Hal Cooper	Barry Bleach and Lynne Kadish	June 14, 1992	N/A
Kirk goes back to high school to get his diploma.
89	21	"Freddy's Back"	Hal Cooper	Cynthia Heimel	June 21, 1992	N/A
John looks after his boss's parrot.
90	22	"The Nightmare Continues"	Hal Cooper	Howard Meyers	July 8, 1992	N/A
Louise encourages the group to face their relationship problems with creative visualization.
