= List of Phyllis episodes =

Phyllis, created by Ed. Weinberger and Stan Daniels based on a character from The Mary Tyler Moore Show, was broadcast on CBS from 1975 to 1977.

== Series overview ==
Season	Episodes	Originally released		Rank	Rating
Season	Episodes	First released	Last released	Rank	Rating
1	24	September 8, 1975	March 1, 1976	6	24.5
2	24	September 20, 1976	March 13, 1977	40	—N/a

== Episodes ==
=== Season 1 (1975–76) ===
- Executive Producers: Ed. Weinberger and Stan Daniels
- Producer: Michael Leeson

No. overall	No. in season	Title	Directed by	Written by	Original release date	Prod. code
1	1	"Pilot"	Jay Sandrich	Ed. Weinberger & Stan Daniels	September 8, 1975	6524
Phyllis moves to San Francisco to start a new life after Lars's death, but the only person willing to give her a job is the woman Lars originally wanted to marry.
2	2	"Bess, Is You a Woman Now?"	Jay Sandrich	Ed. Weinberger & Stan Daniels	September 15, 1975	5208
Phyllis thinks Bess may have lost her virginity on a skiing trip, but can't bring herself to ask her daughter about whether anything happened. Guest starring Leigh McCloskey as Bess' boyfriend.
3	3	"Up for Grabs"	James Burrows	Michael Leeson	September 22, 1975	5201
Lars' old friend Jerome (John McMartin) comes to town to discuss business with Phyllis, but has more than just business on his mind. Note: Barbara Colby's last episode before being murdered.
4	4	"Leaving Home"	James Burrows	Earl Pomerantz	September 29, 1975	5206
Phyllis decides to move out when Jonathan's cranky old mother, Mother Dexter, comes to the house and takes a dislike to her. Note: Introduction of Mother Dexter; Liz Torres replaces the late Barbara Colby as Julie.
5	5	"The First Day"	James Burrows	Earl Pomerantz	October 6, 1975	5204
Phyllis writes a letter to her friend Mary Richards (Mary Tyler Moore) about her new life as a working woman.
6	6	"Phyllis Takes Piano Lessons"	James Burrows	Ed. Weinberger & Stan Daniels	October 13, 1975	5205
Phyllis decides to conquer her childhood fear of performing in public and starts taking piano lessons again -- in a class full of small children.
7	7	"Phyllis's Garage Sale"	James Burrows	Pamela Chais	October 20, 1975	5202
Phyllis has a garage sale to get rid of some of her old belongings from Minneapolis.
8	8	"The First Date"	James Burrows	Seth Freeman	October 27, 1975	5209
Phyllis goes on her first date since Lars's death, but makes it a double date with Julie. Guest starring Tim O'Connor, Daniel J. Travanti and Loni Anderson.
9	9	"All Together Now"	Joan Darling	Gary Markowitz & John W. Regier	November 3, 1975	5203
Phyllis tries to get to know Bess better by going with her to a nightclub.
10	10	"Audrey Leaves Jonathan"	Mel Shapiro	Michael Leeson	November 10, 1975	5207
When Audrey finds out Jonathan once cheated on his first wife, she refuses to sleep in the same room with him.
11	11	"Phyllis Opens Julie's Heart"	Jay Sandrich	David Lloyd	November 17, 1975	5211
Phyllis and Julie open up to each other after Phyllis sees Julie's boyfriend out with another man. Guest starring Tony Roberts as Jerry.
12	12	"So Lonely I Could Cry"	Joan Darling	Mary Kay Place & Valerie Curtin	November 24, 1975	5210
Phyllis attends a support group for widows. Guest starring Charlotte Rae as Shirley.
13	13	"Phyllis and the Little People"	James Burrows	Bob Ellison	December 1, 1975	5213
Bess announces her engagement to her boyfriend (Scott Colomby), and Phyllis meets his parents (Billy Barty and Sadie Delfino), who both turn out to be dwarfs.
14	14	"There's No Business Like No Business"	Jay Sandrich	Earl Pomerantz	December 8, 1975	5212
Julie's photography studio is on the verge of bankruptcy, and Phyllis tries to land a big account to save the business.
15	15	"Paging Dr. Lindstrom"	James Burrows	Glen Charles & Les Charles	December 29, 1975	5215
Phyllis holds a seance to try and contact Lars in the afterlife. Guest starring David Wayne.
16	16	"The $17,623,419.53 Man"	James Burrows	Earl Pomerantz	January 5, 1976	5218
A wealthy middle-aged man (Eugene Roche) asks Phyllis to marry him.
17	17	"Honor Thy Mother Dexter"	Stuart Margolin	Michael Leeson	January 12, 1976	5214
Phyllis gets Mother Dexter a job at Julie's photography studio.
18	18	"Phyllis in Love"	James Burrows	Glen Charles & Les Charles	January 19, 1976	5216
Phyllis falls in love with a married man (Clu Gulager).
19	19	"Crazy Mama"	James Burrows	Glen Charles & Les Charles	January 26, 1976	5219
Bess moves out of the house, and Phyllis goes after her to convince her to come back.
20	20	"A Man, a Woman and Another Woman"	Joan Darling	Earl Pomerantz	February 2, 1976	5220
Jerome (John McMartin) returns to San Francisco after marrying a much younger woman.
21	21	"Leo's Suicide"	James Burrows	Michael Leeson	February 9, 1976	5221
A depressed Leo tries to commit suicide by taking an overdose of Audrey's pills, not realizing that they're only placebos.
22	22	"Sonny Boy"	James Burrows	Glen Charles & Les Charles	February 16, 1976	5223
There's a bad case of sibling rivalry when Jonathan's brother (Dick O'Neill) comes to town.
23	23	"Widows, Merry and Otherwise"	James Burrows	Tony Webster	February 23, 1976	5222
Phyllis meets Audrey's widowed niece Margaret (Linda Lavin) and is astonished by how much quicker Margaret was in getting over her husband's death.
24	24	"The Triangle"	James Burrows	Glen Charles & Les Charles	March 1, 1976	5224
Phyllis starts dating Bess's ex-boyfriend Ralph (Jerry Houser).

=== Season 2 (1976–77) ===
- Executive Producers: Ed. Weinberger and Stan Daniels
- Producers: Glen Charles and Les Charles

No. overall	No. in season	Title	Directed by	Written by	Original release date	Prod. code
25	1	"The New Job"	Jay Sandrich	Ed. Weinberger & Stan Daniels	September 20, 1976	6206
Out of a job again after Julie sells the studio, Phyllis lands a position as an assistant to city supervisor Dan Valenti (Carmine Caridi).
26	2	"You're Not Getting Better, Just Older"	Jay Sandrich	David Lloyd	September 27, 1976	6207
When no one remembers her birthday, a self-pitying Phyllis calls Mary Richards (Mary Tyler Moore), who is so worried about Phyllis that she flies to San Francisco to check on her.
27	3	"Speech 1A"	James Burrows	Gary David Goldberg	October 4, 1976	6208
Phyllis makes her debut as a speechwriter.
28	4	"Off the Bench"	James Burrows	Earl Pomerantz	October 11, 1976	6203
Phyllis meets an unkempt man (Jack Elam) in the park, and tries to give him a new image so he can win the girl of his dreams.
29	5	"Boss or Buddy or Both or Neither"	Joan Darling	Earl Pomerantz	October 18, 1976	6213
Phyllis goes on strike to demand more attention from Dan.
30	6	"Phyllis Cries Wolf"	Doug Rogers	Glen Charles & Les Charles	October 25, 1976	6204
Phyllis is suspicious of the intentions of Bess's new college professor (Terry Kiser).
31	7	"Out of the Closet"	James Burrows	Glen Charles & Les Charles	November 1, 1976	6201
Phyllis's new boyfriend Scott (Edward Winter) reveals that he's gay.
32	8	"The Wrong Box"	James Burrows	Earl Pomerantz	November 8, 1976	6202
Phyllis arranges to have Lars's body shipped to San Francisco, but it's not Lars's body that arrives.
33	9	"Phyllis and the Jumper"	Richard Schaal	Bob Ellison	November 15, 1976	6211
Phyllis has to help talk a man (Jerry Stiller) down from a ledge.
34	10	"Bess Airs Her Views"	Asaad Kelada	Glen Charles & Les Charles	November 29, 1976	6209
Bess joins a crusade to reinstate a teacher who was fired for posing in the nude.
35	11	"Mother Dexter Cohabitates"	Tony Mordente	Glen Charles & Les Charles	December 6, 1976	6210
Mother Dexter shocks the family by shacking up with her equally elderly boyfriend Arthur (Burt Mustin).
36	12	"Mother Dexter's Wedding"	Asaad Kelada	Glen Charles & Les Charles	December 13, 1976	6215
True to her usual form, Phyllis forgets to pick Mother Dexter up for her own wedding.
37	13	"The Christmas Party"	Harry Mastrogeorge	Tom Tenowich	December 20, 1976	6214
Dan won't let Phyllis go to a Christmas party being held on the other side of their office.
38	14	"Phyllis Runs the Office"	Doug Rogers	David Lloyd	January 3, 1977	6220
When Doug is taken to the hospital, Phyllis takes over his duties.
39	15	"The Threat"	Harry Mastrogeorge	George Arthur Bloom & Sandy Glass	January 10, 1977	6212
Leonard receives a death threat.
40	16	"Taking a Chance on Chance"	Doug Rogers	Earl Pomerantz	January 16, 1977	6217
Phyllis's newest beau, Buddy (Robert Alda), is a compulsive gambler.
41	17	"Leonard and the Bribe"	Noam Pitlik	Bob Ellison	January 23, 1977	6221
Leonard is offered a $100,000 bribe.
42	18	"Broken-Hearted Bess"	Noam Pitlik	Glen Charles & Les Charles	January 30, 1977	6218
After Bess is dumped by her boyfriend, Phyllis tries to brighten her spirits with a trip.
43	19	"I Am Beautiful"	Doug Rogers	Arthur S. Rabin	February 6, 1977	6216
Phyllis helps a co-worker with a crush on Leonard. Note: Final episode for Judith Lowry as Mother Dexter.
44	20	"Dan's Ex"	Doug Rogers	Glen Charles & Les Charles	February 13, 1977	6224
Phyllis makes a disastrous attempt to get Dan back together with his ex-wife Joanne (Marcia Rodd).
45	21	"Audrey's New Life"	Doug Rogers	Tom Tenowich	February 20, 1977	6225
Audrey gets a job in an antique store, and Jonathan thinks her boss has designs on her.
46	22	"The Elopement"	Doug Rogers	Laurence Marks	February 27, 1977	6223
Bess elopes with Dan's nephew Mark (Craig Wasson).
47	23	"The Apartment"	Noam Pitlik	Laurence Marks	March 6, 1977	6226
Concerned by the state of Bess and Mark's apartment, Phyllis tries to get them to move into Jonathan's house.
48	24	"And Baby Makes Six"	Noam Pitlik	Glen Charles & Les Charles	March 13, 1977	6227
Mark is on the verge of leaving Bess when she announces that she's pregnant.
