= Phyllis (TV series) =

American sitcom (1975–1977)

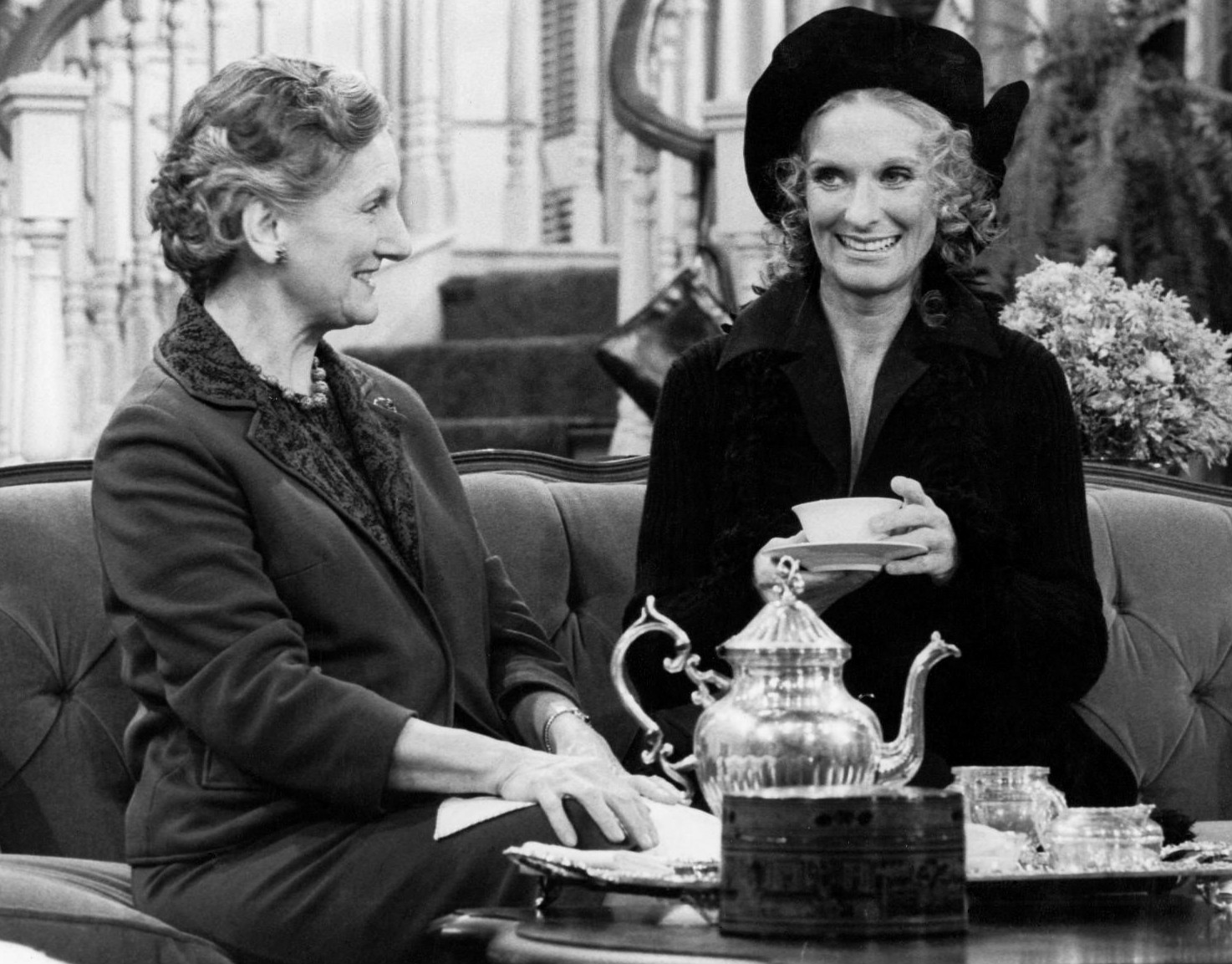
- Mother-in-law Audrey Dexter (Jane Rose) with Phyllis (1975)
- Genre: Sitcom
- Created by: Stan Daniels; Ed. Weinberger
- Based on: Phyllis Lindstrom by James L. Brooks and Allan Burns
- Starring: Cloris Leachman; Henry Jones; Jane Rose; Judith Lowry; Lisa Gerritsen; Barbara Colby; Liz Torres; Richard Schaal; Carmine Caridi; Garn Stephens; John Lawlor
- Theme music composer: Stan Daniels
- Composer: Dick DeBenedictis
- Country of origin: United States
- Original language: English
- No. of seasons: 2
- No. of episodes: 48 (list of episodes)

Production
- Producers: Stan Daniels; Michael J. Leeson; Ed. Weinberger
- Camera setup: Multi-camera
- Running time: 24 minutes
- Production company: MTM Enterprises

Original release
- Network: CBS
- Release: September 8, 1975 – March 13, 1977

Related
- The Mary Tyler Moore Show; Rhoda; Lou Grant

Phyllis is an American sitcom television series that aired on CBS from September 8, 1975, to March 13, 1977. Created by Ed. Weinberger and Stan Daniels, based on the character created by James L. Brooks and Allan Burns for The Mary Tyler Moore Show, it was the second spin-off of The Mary Tyler Moore Show (the first being Rhoda). Mary Tyler Moore Show producer James L. Brooks was also involved with the show as a creative consultant. The show starred Cloris Leachman as Phyllis Lindstrom, who had been Mary Richards' friend, neighbor, and landlady on The Mary Tyler Moore Show.

In this series, Phyllis and her daughter Bess Lindstrom move from Minneapolis to San Francisco after the death of Phyllis' husband, Dr. Lars Lindstrom. It was revealed that San Francisco was Phyllis and Lars's original hometown prior to their moving to Minneapolis, and that Lars's mother and stepfather still reside there.

== Synopsis and production ==
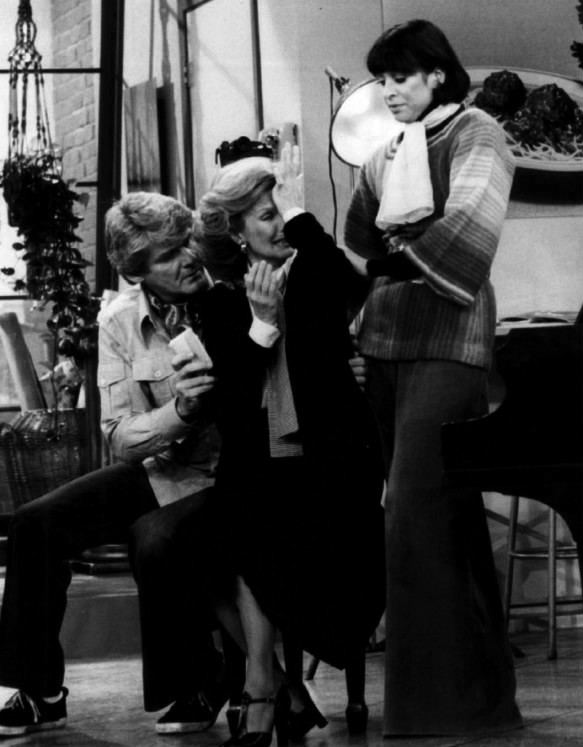
When Phyllis' musical efforts hit a sour note, Leo (Richard Schaal) and Julie (Liz Torres) comfort her.

Left penniless after the death of her husband Lars, Phyllis and her daughter Bess (Lisa Gerritsen) move in with Lars's mother, the scatterbrained Audrey Dexter (Jane Rose) and stepfather Judge Jonathan Dexter (Henry Jones). Phyllis takes a job as an assistant in a photographic studio. The owner, Julie Erskine, was played by Barbara Colby. In the 1974–1975 season, Colby was featured on The Mary Tyler Moore Show playing Sherry Ferris, a prostitute whom Mary Richards (Moore) befriends. Her appearances on that show were so popular with viewers that when Phyllis was being cast, the producers enthusiastically signed her as a regular cast member. However, after three episodes of Phyllis had been filmed, Colby was murdered and the part was assumed by Liz Torres. Leo Heatherton (Richard Schaal, who was married to Valerie Harper, who played the title character in Rhoda) was a well-meaning but bumbling photographer at the studio.

Much of the first season's humor stemmed from Phyllis' attempts to fit into the job market, having lived for many years as the spoiled wife of a rich dermatologist. Judith Lowry guest starred in an early episode ("Leaving Home") as Jonathan's mother, Sally Dexter. She was so well received by viewers that by the end of the first year Lowry became a regular when Mother Dexter joined the household.

Aired on Monday nights between two popular shows – Rhoda and All in the Family – Phyllis instantly became a top ten hit. Cloris Leachman won a Golden Globe Award for Best Lead Actress in a Comedy Series and was nominated for an Emmy Award for Outstanding Lead Actress in a Comedy Series. The sitcom was the sixth highest-rated television series for the 1975–76 television season (at the time ranking higher than both Rhoda and The Mary Tyler Moore Show).

=== Season two ===
Toward the end of the first season, the ratings were beginning to slip. As a result, the series premise was reworked for the second season. Erskine Photography and the characters Julie Erskine (Liz Torres) and Leo Heatherton (Richard Schaal) were dropped with the explanation that Julie had married suddenly, sold the photography studio, and moved away, putting Phyllis out of a job. Leachman, Gerritsen, Jones, Rose and Lowry remained with Phyllis.

In the second-season premiere Phyllis was hired as an assistant to a San Francisco City Supervisor.

New characters were Phyllis's boss Dan Valenti (Carmine Caridi), Leonard Marsh (John Lawlor), an inept politician in the office, and Leonard's secretary Harriet Hastings (Garn Stephens). Harriet was initially Phyllis's rival, but they later became friends. Both Caridi and Lawlor had appeared in two separate episodes of Phyllis the previous season - Caridi as a junk dealer in the episode "Phyllis's Garage Sale" and Lawlor as a policeman in the episode "Crazy Mama".

The ratings continued to drop. Rhoda was also going through a format change at the time, which may have also affected Phyllis’ ratings. During this time both series' chief competition, NBC's Little House on the Prairie, flourished.

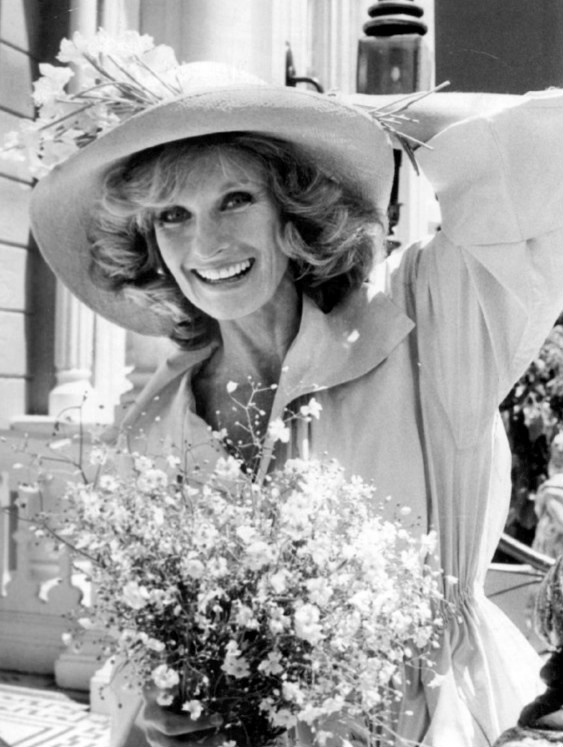
Cloris Leachman as Phyllis

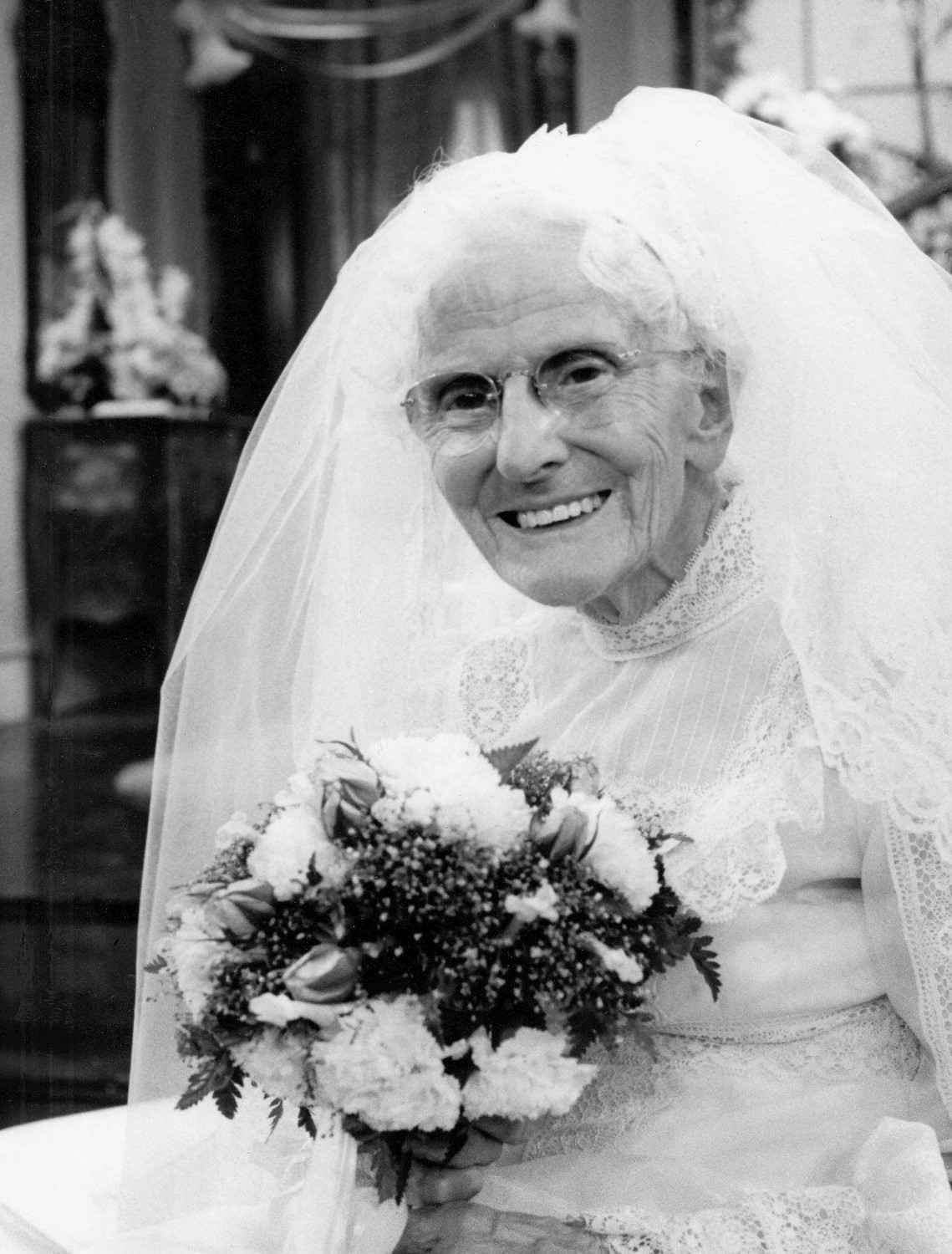
Judith Lowry as Mother Dexter (1976)

In a December 1976 episode, Jonathan's cranky and outspoken Mother Dexter (Lowry), Phyllis' main nemesis, married Arthur Lanson (Burt Mustin); both Lowry, 86, and Mustin, 92, died within a month of the episode's airing. (Episodes featuring Lowry continued to air through early February 1977; Mustin's character was mentioned but not seen after the wedding episode.).

CBS moved both Rhoda and Phyllis to Sunday nights at 8:00 P.M. and 8:30 P.M., respectively. Actress Jane Rose (who played Audrey Dexter) took ill with cancer, and though she did not leave the show, her role was reduced so that she could deal with her illness. These cast changes necessitated new story lines. Bess's role became more prominent. She found romance with Mark Valenti (Craig Wasson), the nephew of Phyllis' boss, and they later married.

By the middle of the 1976–77 season, the ratings for Rhoda had improved but Phyllis was still faltering. Rhoda was renewed for an additional season (it would ultimately be canceled in December 1978), but Phyllis was dropped by CBS in the spring of 1977, finishing in 40th place that season. The complications resulting from the deaths of several cast members during the show's run, as well as the ill health of actress Jane Rose, are said to have been factors in the series' cancellation.

The final episode ("And Baby Makes Six") had Bess announcing that she and Mark were expecting their first child. This installment aired Sunday, March 13, 1977. The same week, on Saturday, March 19, Leachman made her last appearance as Phyllis Lindstrom on the final episode of The Mary Tyler Moore Show.

== Cast ==
- Cloris Leachman as Phyllis Lindstrom, a self-centered but well-meaning woman who moves to San Francisco, California from Minneapolis, Minnesota, after her husband, Lars, dies and leaves her and her daughter with no savings. She suddenly finds herself having to find a job after being the pampered wife of a dermatologist for decades. In season one, she works as a photographer's assistant, and in season two, she works as a political assistant. Phyllis was previously a featured character on The Mary Tyler Moore Show as Mary Richards' good friend and landlord. Leachman made her final appearance as Phyllis on the finale of The Mary Tyler Moore Show, a week after the spinoff series ended its run. In the episode, she visits Mary with her frenemy, Rhoda Morgenstern, in order to cheer Mary up when she gets fired from her job.
- Henry Jones as Judge Jonathan Dexter, the calm and level-headed second husband of Audrey Dexter. Phyllis's husband Lars was his stepson. He is both protective and judgmental of his mother Sally, whose frank, provocative and sometimes shocking behavior (at least for a family that considers themselves upper class) usually leads to his chagrin.
- Jane Rose as Audrey Dexter, the ditzy and ever-cheerful wife of Jonathan. She had a son named Lars Lindstrom with her first husband. After Lars' death in 1975, her penniless, widowed daughter-in-law and granddaughter move from Minnesota to live with them in California. Rose became ill with cancer toward the end of the show's run, reducing her screen time and leading the show to depend more on characters like Bess and Mark to provide plots for later episodes.
- Lisa Gerritsen as Bess Lindstrom, Phyllis's highly intelligent and mature daughter. Bess is a 17-year-old senior in high school during season one and an 18-year-old freshman in college during season two. Upon moving to San Francisco, Bess goes through many boyfriends and heartbreaks before entering a whirlwind romance with Mark Valenti, the nephew of her mother's boss. She quickly marries Mark and announces that she is pregnant with their child in the series finale. She and Phyllis both appeared on The Mary Tyler Moore Show before moving to the new show.
- Judith Lowry as Sally "Mother" Dexter, Jonathan's cantankerous, sharp-tongued, 86-year-old mother. While she has a soft spot for Bess, Mother Dexter acts abrasively toward Phyllis. Mother Dexter has a lascivious side, frequently demonstrating her sexual feelings for actor Charles Bronson. In season two, she shocks the rest of her family by shacking up with her boyfriend, Arthur Lanson, in his mobile home. After talking over the situation with her family and Arthur, the couple decides that they want to get married and have their wedding officiated by Jonathan in the living room of the Dexter home. Lowry appeared as Mother Dexter in five episodes after the wedding episode. She had died of a heart attack at the age of 86 in November 1976, a month before the wedding episode aired. Burt Mustin, who portrayed Arthur, died two months after Lowry.
- Barbara Colby as Julie Erskine #1 (1975), Phyllis's first boss. Along with Burt Mustin, Colby came to Phyllis after playing a different role on The Mary Tyler Moore Show. She had previously played a prostitute who befriended Mary Richards when they spent the night in jail together. The character of Erskine was recast with Liz Torres after Colby was killed in a drive-by shooting while walking out of an acting class.
- Liz Torres as Julie Erskine #2 (1975–1976). Torres replaced Barbara Colby after she was murdered in July 1975. The character was written out of the series after the first season.
- Richard Schaal as Leo Heatherton (1975–1976), Phyllis's well-meaning, but bumbling coworker at the photography studio. Along with Julie, the character of Leo was written out of the series after season one ended in an attempt to rework the series and boost ratings.
- Carmine Caridi as Dan Valenti (1976–1977), Phyllis's boss in season two when she becomes a political assistant. His nephew, Mark, eventually becomes Bess' husband.
- John Lawlor as Leonard Marsh (1976–1977), another politician who works in the same office as Dan and Phyllis. Leonard is sometimes extremely dim, but is able to look good on camera and give a quotable soundbite. He and Phyllis don't get along particularly well.
- Garn Stephens as Harriet Hastings (1976–1977), Phyllis's co-worker in season two. Like Leonard, Harriet does not have a very friendly relationship with Phyllis—at least initially. Over time, they become more bonded.
- Burt Mustin as Arthur Lanson (1976), the devoted suitor, and later husband, of Mother Dexter. He is an elderly veteran of World War I who lives in a trailer park. He enjoys hanging out with fellow World War I veterans and exchanging stories of their time in combat. He is mentioned during the latter half of season two but disappeared from the show soon after the episode in which he and Mother Dexter marry. Mustin became ill not long after the episode's airing, and died in January 1977, right before his 93rd birthday. He was the third cast member of the series to die in its relatively short run.
- Craig Wasson as Mark Valenti (1977), Dan's college-aged nephew who has dreams of becoming a successful musician. He and Bess fall in love toward the end of season two and quickly get married. Bess announces she is pregnant with their child in the series finale.

== Syndication ==
- During the 1990s, Phyllis was aired on Nick at Nite alongside Rhoda and The Mary Tyler Moore Show. Eventually, all three shows were moved to sister-network TV Land for a short while before simply disappearing altogether. Also in the early 1990s, the series was aired on HA! before it merged with The Comedy Channel and became Comedy Central.
- In January 2010, AmericanLife Network (ALN) began airing the series and is again shown alongside Rhoda in syndication. However, this time, the network stopped showing The Mary Tyler Moore Show when it added Rhoda and Phyllis to its lineup. The series was removed from the lineup in September 2010.

== Home media ==
In July 1992, a VHS titled Phyllis—Volume 1 containing the first two episodes was released by MTM Home Video; however, a second volume was never released.

VHS name	Ep#	Release date	Titles
Phyllis—Volume 1	2	July 1992	Pilot; Bess, Is You a Woman Now?
