= Top-rated United States television programs of 1975–76 =

This table displays the top-rated primetime television series of the 1975–76 season as measured by Nielsen Media Research.

Rank	Program	Network	Rating
1	All in the Family	CBS	30.1
2	Rich Man, Poor Man	ABC	28.0
3	Laverne & Shirley	ABC	27.5
4	Maude	CBS	25.0
5	The Bionic Woman	ABC	24.9
6	Phyllis	CBS	24.5
7	Sanford and Son	NBC	24.4
7	Rhoda	CBS	24.4
9	The Six Million Dollar Man	ABC	24.3
10	ABC Monday Night Movie	ABC	24.2
11	Happy Days	ABC	23.9
12	One Day at a Time	CBS	23.1
13	ABC Sunday Night Movie	ABC	23.0
14	The Waltons	CBS	22.9
14	M*A*S*H	CBS	22.9
16	Starsky & Hutch	ABC	22.5
16	Good Heavens	ABC	22.5
18	Welcome Back, Kotter	ABC	22.1
19	The Mary Tyler Moore Show	CBS	21.9
20	Kojak	CBS	21.8
21	The Jeffersons	CBS	21.5
22	Baretta	ABC	21.3
23	The Sonny & Cher Show	CBS	21.2
24	Good Times	CBS	21.0
25	Chico and the Man	NBC	20.8
26	The Bob Newhart Show	CBS	20.7
26	Donny & Marie	ABC	20.7
26	The Streets of San Francisco	ABC	20.7
29	The Carol Burnett Show	CBS	20.5
30	Police Woman	NBC	20.2
