= Tom Willett =

American actor and YouTuber (born 1938)

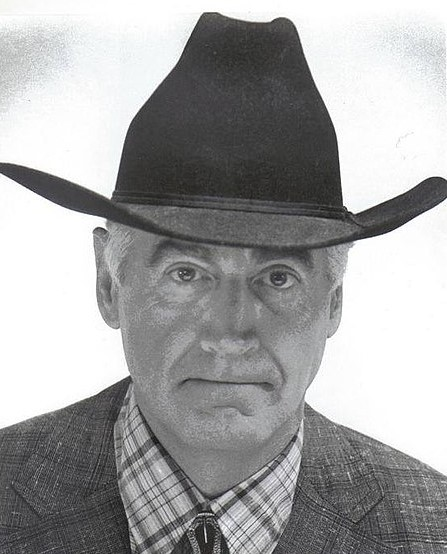
- Willett as a cowboy in the 1980s
- Born: Thomas Willett; 1938 (age 87–88); Chenault, Kentucky, U.S.
- Other name: Herman Schmerdley
- Occupations: Actor, singer-songwriter, YouTuber
- Years active: 1956–present
- Known for: The Featureman YouTube Channel
- Notable work: Dear John

YouTube information
- Channel: Featureman
- Years active: 2006–present
- Subscribers: 373K
- Views: 28.9 million
- Last updated: 1 July 2025

Thomas Willett (born 1938) is an American television and film actor, record producer, singer-songwriter, and YouTuber. Willett is best known for playing non-speaking roles, such as the character Tom on the sitcom television series Dear John which ran on NBC from 1988 to 1992.

== Career ==
In April 1956 at age 17, Willett moved to Los Angeles. He produced country music records in the evenings, while working at a furniture warehouse during the day. His label was called Freeway Records and boasted releases by musicians such as Greg Penny; as well as Willett's own piano-playing alter-ego, "Herman Schmerdley". One of his songs, a rockabilly tune called "Mona Lisa", received significant airplay and allowed Willett the opportunity to perform on such shows as The Gong Show. For several years, Willett produced numerous records under his pseudonym, mostly covers and original tunes; until the market for country music singles began to dwindle. "The country singles market is somewhat limited," he once said in an interview, "and that's going to hurt us because we're putting out country singles." Following his recording career, Willett toured for a short period of time, performing in piano bars and honky-tonks throughout the south. By 1962, Willett moved to Las Vegas where he took up writing material for second rate comedy acts. In addition to writing comedic routines, he also wrote country tunes for various rising stars, including Roy Clark.

After a short stint as a disc jockey at KENO radio, Willett began landing bit parts in films and television shows. "I've been in some dreadful movies," Willett once said. One of his first gigs was as an extra in the 1975 American comedy-drama film Rafferty and the Gold Dust Twins. More notable roles include playing opposite Mary Steenburgen in the film Melvin and Howard, along with television spots in shows such as Happy Days, The Drew Carey Show and Dear John.

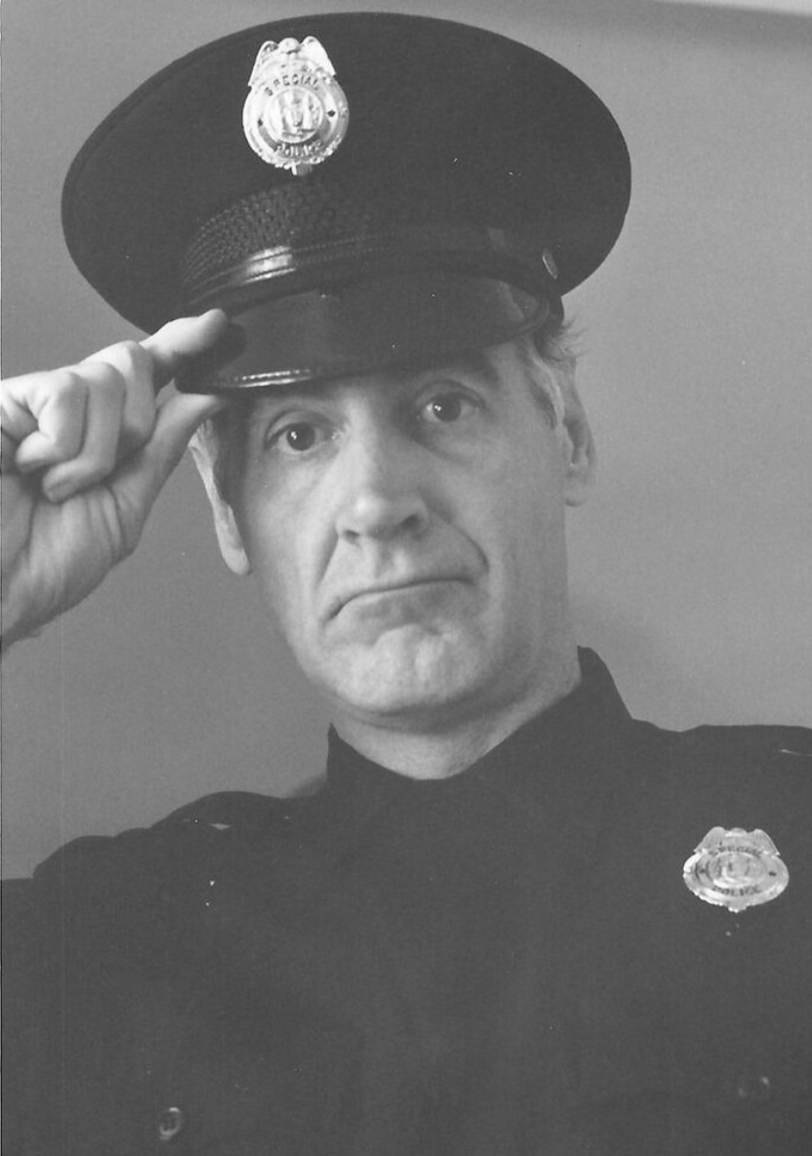
Willett wearing a police uniform

On the series Dear John, Willett played a character that never spoke. For the auditions, Willett recalls that he beat out the other applicants by wearing a suit with wide lapels and a "behind-the-times" tie. "They told me the guy should be well-dressed," Willett said, "and he should be immaculate, but there's got to be something wrong about him. So I made him 15 years behind the times." When it came to auditions, Willett said, "You're not supposed to crash auditions, but I crashed auditions." Standing 6-foot 5 inches tall, Willett invested small amounts of money in audition attire. "One of the things I did, I got an Abe Lincoln beard and hat and everything. I was Abe Lincoln in a lot of productions ... I could be a cowboy, I could be a prisoner, I could be a detective."

According to Willett, he has had "over 800 jobs in front of the camera", including over 100 films, 80 television movies and more than 145 TV programs; mostly uncredited and non-speaking roles.

== YouTube channel ==
Willett made his first YouTube video in 2006; but it was not until August 2012 that his YouTube work was noted in media with a 10-minute video tutorial entitled "How to Eat a Watermelon". The Huffington Post called him "the Bob Ross of watermelon eating".

Called a "YouTube sensation" in the Nashville Scene, Willett's channel is titled Featureman. Online food reviewer Clayton Trutor commented in 2021 that Willett has a "refreshing appreciation for the ordinary" and "the ability to make the seemingly mundane seem awfully interesting".

== Legal issues ==
In the mid-1970s, Willett received three life sentences from a Nevada court on the grounds of "infamous crime against nature". He was placed on probation after the sentences were suspended. In 2023, he spoke of the ruling in a YouTube video which he later deleted.

== Filmography ==
(partial listing of notable television and film appearances)

Year	Title	Role	Note
1979–1980	Vega$	Gambler / Coroner	3 episodes
1977–1982	The Incredible Hulk	Match Spectator	Episode: "Half Nelson"
1980	Melvin and Howard	Kissing Cowboy	Uncredited
1982	Happy Days	Abe Lincoln	Episode: "Poobah Doo Dah"
1980–1982	Quincy M.E.	Various	3 episodes
1982	Grease 2	Bowling Alley Manager	Uncredited
1982	Little House on the Prairie	Cowboy	Uncredited
1982	Airplane II: The Sequel	Hospital Dipstick Patient	Uncredited
1981–1983	Dynasty	Hotel Guest / Man at Station	2 episodes
1983	Psycho II	Grave Digger	Uncredited
1983	Blood Feud	Attorney	Uncredited
1981–1983	Twilight Zone: The Movie	K.K.K.	Episode: "Time Out"
1984	Dukes of Hazzard	Deputy	Episode: "Cool Hands, Luke & Bo"
1985	The New Mike Hammer	Funeral Director	Episode: "Deadly Reunion"
1985	Hill Street Blues	Arts Council / Police Official	2 episodes
1985	Murder, She Wrote	Doctor	Episode: "Keep the Homes Fries Burning"
1985–1986	Amazing Stories	Various	3 episodes
1985–1986	L.A. Law	Courtroom / Lawyer	2 episodes
1988–1992	Dear John	Tom	90 episodes
1997	Bringing up Jack	Abe Lincoln	Episode: "The Beeper"
1997	George & Leo	Mayor	Episode: "The Cameo Episode"
1998	The Drew Carey Show	Abe Lincoln	Episode: "What’s Wrong with This Episode?"
2018–2020	The Andy Due Show	Various	6 episodes
2020	Bigtop Burger	Customer / Panelist	2 episodes

== Bibliography ==
- Willett, Tom (April 5, 2017). How To Become a Movie Extra: How to Get Into Movies for Beginners. CreateSpace Independent Publishing Platform. ISBN 978-1544827629.
- Willett, Tom (June 27, 2017). Earthquake, The Big One, Before, During, After. CreateSpace Independent Publishing Platform. ISBN 978-1544939100.
