= List of Lou Grant episodes =

This is a list of episodes of the television drama series Lou Grant, a spin-off of the comedy series The Mary Tyler Moore Show.

== Series overview ==
Season	Episodes	Originally released		Rank
Season	Episodes	First released	Last released	Rank
1	22	September 20, 1977	March 20, 1978	36
2	24	September 25, 1978	May 7, 1979	30
3	24	September 17, 1979	March 24, 1980	—N/a
4	20	September 22, 1980	May 4, 1981	27
5	24	November 2, 1981	September 13, 1982	38

== Episodes ==
=== Season 1 (1977–78) ===
No. overall	No. in season	Title	Directed by	Written by	Original release date	Prod. code
1	1	"Cophouse"	Gene Reynolds	Leon Tokatyan	September 20, 1977	7501
2	2	"Hostages"	Charles Dubin	Seth Freeman	September 27, 1977	7510
3	3	"Hoax"	Jay Sandrich	Gordon Dawson	October 4, 1977	7503
4	4	"Henhouse"	Richard Crenna	Leonora Thuna	October 11, 1977	7509
5	5	"Nazi"	Alexander Singer	Robert Schlitt	October 18, 1977	7505
6	6	"Aftershock"	Jud Taylor	Del Reisman	October 25, 1977	7506
7	7	"Barrio"	Mel Damski	Seth Freeman	November 1, 1977	7504
8	8	"Scoop"	Harry Falk	Gene Kearney	November 8, 1977	7502
9	9	"Judge"	Irving Moore	Leon Tokatyan	November 15, 1977	7508
10	10	"Psych-Out"	Alexander Singer	Seth Freeman	November 22, 1977	7515
11	11	"Housewarming"	Mel Damski	Leonora Thuna	November 29, 1977	7512
12	12	"Takeover"	Gene Reynolds	Leon Tokatyan	December 6, 1977	7513
13	13	"Christmas"	James Burrows	David Lloyd	December 13, 1977	7507
14	14	"Airliner"	Mel Damski	Charles Einstein	January 3, 1978	7514
15	15	"Sports"	Harvey Laidman	Bud Freeman	January 10, 1978	7516
16	16	"Hero"	Mel Damski	Seth Freeman	January 17, 1978	7518
17	17	"Renewal"	Gene Reynolds	Ken Travey	January 30, 1978	7511
18	18	"Sect"	Alexander Singer	Michele Gallery	February 6, 1978	7517
19	19	"Scandal"	Mel Damski	Seth Freeman	February 13, 1978	7520
20	20	"Spies"	Charles Dubin	Leon Tokatyan	February 27, 1978	7519
21	21	"Poison"	Gene Reynolds	Michele Gallery	March 6, 1978	7521
22	22	"Physical"	Charles Dubin	David Lloyd	March 20, 1978	7522

=== Season 2 (1978–79) ===
No. overall	No. in season	Title	Directed by	Written by	Original release date	Prod. code
23	1	"Pills"	Jay Sandrich	Michele Gallery	September 25, 1978	8502
24	2	"Prisoner"	Gene Reynolds	Seth Freeman	October 2, 1978	8501
25	3	"Hooker"	Alexander Singer	Seth Freeman	October 16, 1978	8508
26	4	"Mob"	Corey Allen	Leon Tokatyan	October 23, 1978	8505
27	5	"Murder"	Mel Damski	Gary David Goldberg	October 30, 1978 (Note: This episode was originally scheduled to air as the season premiere on September 18, 1978, but was preempted due to news coverage of Camp David Accords.)	8504
28	6	"Dying"	Alexander Singer	Michele Gallery	November 6, 1978	8509
29	7	"Schools"	Burt Brinckerhoff	Gary David Goldberg	November 20, 1978	8510
30	8	"Slaughter"	Roger Young	Bud Freeman	November 27, 1978	8503
31	9	"Singles"	Michael Zinberg	Gina Frederica Goldman & Sally Robinson	December 4, 1978	8506
32	10	"Babies"	Alexander Singer	David Lloyd	December 11, 1978	8512
33	11	"Conflict"	Mel Damski	Michele Gallery	December 18, 1978	8513
34	12	"Denial"	Charles Dubin	Leonora Thuna	January 1, 1979	8507
35	13	"Fire"	Roger Young	Seth Freeman	January 8, 1979	8514
36	14	"Vet"	Alexander Singer	Leon Tokatyan	January 15, 1979	8511
37	15	"Scam"	Gerald Mayer	Gary David Goldberg	January 22, 1979	8515
38	16	"Sweep"	Charles Dubin	Steve Kline	February 5, 1979	8517
39	17	"Samaritan"	Paul Leaf	Elliot West	February 12, 1979	8516
40	18	"Hit"	Peter Levin	Michele Gallery	February 19, 1979	8519
41	19	"Home"	Alexander Singer	Gary David Goldberg	February 26, 1979	8520
42	20	"Convention"	Charles Dubin	David Lloyd	March 5, 1979	8522
43	21	"Marathon"	Alexander Singer	Gene Reynolds	March 19, 1979	8518
44	22	"Bomb"	Gene Reynolds	Seth Freeman	March 26, 1979	8521
45	23	"Skids"	Burt Brinckerhoff	Steve Kline	April 2, 1979	8523
46	24	"Romance"	Roger Young	Michele Gallery	May 7, 1979	8524

=== Season 3 (1979–80) ===
No. overall	No. in season	Title	Directed by	Written by	Original release date	Prod. code
47	1	"Cop"	Roger Young	Seth Freeman	September 17, 1979	9504
48	2	"Expose"	Gene Reynolds	David Lloyd	September 24, 1979	9506
49	3	"Slammer"	Alexander Singer	Johnny Dawkins	October 1, 1979	9501
50	4	"Charlatan"	Roger Young	Michael Vittes	October 15, 1979	9505
51	5	"Frame-Up"	Burt Brinckerhoff	Steve Kline	October 22, 1979	9507
52	6	"Hype"	Peter Levin	Michele Gallery	October 29, 1979	9503
53	7	"Gambling"	Alexander Singer	Bud Freeman	November 5, 1979	9510
54	8	"Witness"	Peter Levin	Gary David Goldberg	November 12, 1979	9502
55	9	"Kidnap"	Alan Cooke	Bud Freeman	November 26, 1979	9514
56	10	"Andrew: Part 1 - Premonition"	Roger Young	Seth Freeman	December 3, 1979	9508
57	11	"Andrew: Part 2 - Trial"	Peter Levin	Seth Freeman	December 10, 1979	9509
58	12	"Hollywood"	Burt Brinckerhoff	Michele Gallery	December 17, 1979	9513
59	13	"Kids"	Alexander Singer	Michael Vittes & Shep Greene	December 24, 1979	9511
60	14	"Brushfire"	Donald A. Baer	Allan Burns & Gene Reynolds	January 7, 1980	9516
61	15	"Indians"	Ralph Senensky	April Smith	January 14, 1980	9512
62	16	"Cover-Up"	Gerald Mayer	Paul Ehrmann	January 21, 1980	9517
63	17	"Inheritance"	Roger Young	April Smith	January 28, 1980	9518
64	18	"Censored"	Alexander Singer	Joanne Pagliaro	February 4, 1980	9515
65	19	"Lou"	Roger Young	Michele Gallery	February 11, 1980	9519
66	20	"Blackout"	Allen Williams	Steve Kline	February 18, 1980	9520
67	21	"Dogs"	Burt Brinckerhoff	Seth Freeman	March 3, 1980	9521
68	22	"Influence"	Gene Reynolds	April Smith	March 10, 1980	9522
69	23	"Guns"	Bob Sweeney	Seth Freeman	March 17, 1980	9524
70	24	"Hazard"	Burt Brinckerhoff	Michele Gallery	March 24, 1980	9523

=== Season 4 (1980–81) ===
No. overall	No. in season	Title	Directed by	Written by	Original release date	Prod. code
71	1	"Nightside"	Gene Reynolds	Michele Gallery	September 22, 1980	0504
72	2	"Harassment"	Roger Young	April Smith	September 29, 1980	0501
73	3	"Pack"	Burt Brinckerhoff	Steve Kline	October 27, 1980	0502
74	4	"Sting"	Peter Levin	Patt Shea & Harriet Weiss	November 17, 1980	0503
75	5	"Goop"	Alexander Singer	Seth Freeman	November 24, 1980	0507
76	6	"Libel"	Burt Brinckerhoff	William Hopkins	December 8, 1980	0506
77	7	"Streets"	Donald A. Baer	Bud Freeman	December 15, 1980	0505
78	8	"Catch"	Roger Young	Michele Gallery	January 5, 1981	0511
79	9	"Rape"	Seth Freeman	Seth Freeman	January 12, 1981	0516
80	10	"Boomerang"	Alexander Singer	Steve Kline	January 19, 1981	0512
81	11	"Generations"	Harvey Laidman	Johnny Dawkins	January 26, 1981	0514
82	12	"Search"	Allen Williams	Everett Greenbaum & Elliott Reid	February 9, 1981	0515
83	13	"Strike"	Gene Reynolds	April Smith	February 16, 1981	0510
84	14	"Survival"	Burt Brinckerhoff	April Smith	February 23, 1981	0517
85	15	"Venice"	Paul Stanley	Patt Shea & Harriet Weiss	March 9, 1981	0509
86	16	"Campesinos"	Peter Levin	Michael Vittes	March 16, 1981	0513
87	17	"Business"	Alan Cooke	Steve Kline	March 23, 1981	0518
88	18	"Violence"	Georg Stanford Brown	Johnny Dawkins	April 6, 1981	0519
89	19	"Depression"	Peter Levin	Gene Reynolds	April 13, 1981	0508
90	20	"Stroke"	Roger Young	April Smith	May 4, 1981	0520

=== Season 5 (1981–82) ===
No. overall	No. in season	Title	Directed by	Written by	Original release date	Prod. code
91	1	"Wedding"	Alexander Singer	Seth Freeman	November 2, 1981	1501
92	2	"Execution"	Burt Brinckerhoff	April Smith	November 9, 1981	1502
93	3	"Reckless"	Alexander Singer	Steve Kline	November 16, 1981	1503
94	4	"Hometown"	Gene Reynolds	Michele Gallery	November 23, 1981	1504
95	5	"Risk"	Allen Williams	Seth Freeman	November 30, 1981	0521
96	6	"Double-Cross"	Roger Young	Michele Gallery	December 7, 1981	0522
97	7	"Drifters"	Peter Levin	Bud Freeman	December 14, 1981	1505
98	8	"Friends"	Seth Freeman	Seth Freeman	December 28, 1981	1510
99	9	"Jazz"	Burt Brinckerhoff	Rogers Turrentine	January 4, 1982	1506
100	10	"Ghosts"	Roger Young	April Smith	January 11, 1982	1507
101	11	"Cameras"	Peter Levin	David Lloyd	January 25, 1982	1509
102	12	"Review"	Neil Cox	Jeffrey B. Lane	February 8, 1982	1512
103	13	"Immigrants"	Alexander Singer	Steve Kline	February 15, 1982	1511
104	14	"Hunger"	Peter Levin	Gene Reynolds	March 1, 1982	1508
105	15	"Recovery"	Roger Young	Michele Gallery	March 8, 1982	1513
106	16	"Obituary"	Paul Stanley	April Smith	March 22, 1982	1514
107	17	"Blacklist"	Burt Brinckerhoff	Seth Freeman	April 5, 1982	1515
108	18	"Law"	Burt Brinckerhoff	Steve Kline	April 12, 1982	1516
109	19	"Fireworks"	Jeff Bleckner	Michele Gallery	April 19, 1982	1517
110	20	"Unthinkable"	Allen Williams	April Smith	May 3, 1982	1519
111	21	"Suspect"	Alan Cooke	Seth Freeman	May 17, 1982	1522
112	22	"Beachhead"	Roy Campanella	Gene Reynolds	May 24, 1982	1520
113	23	"Victims"	Peter Bogart	Steve Kline	August 30, 1982	1521
114	24	"Charlie"	Seth Freeman	Michele Gallery	September 13, 1982	1523

== See also ==
- List of The Mary Tyler Moore Show episodes
- List of Rhoda episodes
- List of Phyllis episodes
