= Daryl Anderson =

American television actor (b. 1951)

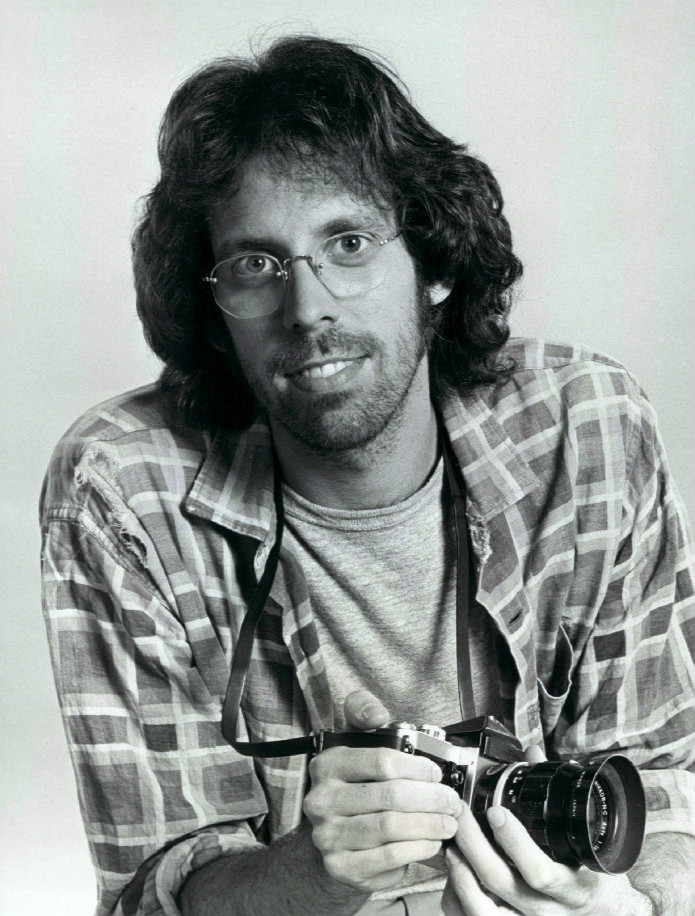
- Anderson as Animal in Lou Grant.
- Born: July 1, 1951 (age 75); Seattle, Washington, U.S.
- Occupation: Actor
- Years active: 1972–present

Daryl Anderson (born July 1, 1951) is an American television actor. He made his film debut in Sweet Revenge in 1976. He is best known for playing photographer Dennis "The Animal" Price on the television series Lou Grant, from 1977 to 1982.
