= Stan Daniels =

American film producer

- Born: Stanley Edwin Daniels; July 31, 1934; Toronto, Ontario, Canada
- Died: April 6, 2007 (aged 72); Encino, California, U.S.
- Occupations: Screenwriter, producer and director
- Spouse: Alene Kamins (1957–2007; his death)
- Children: 4

Stanley Edwin Daniels (July 31, 1934 – April 6, 2007) was a Canadian-American screenwriter, producer and director, who won eight Emmy Awards for his work on The Mary Tyler Moore Show and Taxi.

== Early life ==
Born in Toronto to Jewish parents involved in vaudeville, Daniels earned a bachelor's degree and master's degree from the University of Toronto, then began studying for a doctorate from Oxford University. His first television writing job was for The Dean Martin Show in 1965. There, he met his writing partner Ed. Weinberger.

== Career ==
Daniels's influence in comedy is noted by the joke setup that is credited to him ("Stan Daniels turn") wherein "a character says something and then does an immediate 180-degree shift on what he just said," according to The Simpsons producer Al Jean. Daniels composed the music and wrote the lyrics for the 1976 musical So Long, 174th Street.

== Death ==
Daniels was diagnosed with frontotemporal dementia a few years prior to his death. He died of a heart attack in Encino, California.

== Filmography ==
=== Director ===
- Best of the West (1 episode, 1981)
- Taxi (1 episode, 1982)
- Mr. Smith (Unknown episodes, 1983)
- Dear John (5 episodes, 1988–1989)
- Flying Blind (2 episodes, 1993)
- Almost Perfect (Unknown episodes, 1995)
- High Society (1 episode, 1995)
- Partners (1 episode, 1996)
- Sparks (3 episodes, 1996–1997)
- Good News (4 episodes, 1997)

=== Producer ===
- The Mary Tyler Moore Show (Unknown episodes, 1970)
- Doc (Executive producer, 1 episode, 1976)
- The Betty White Show (Executive producer, unknown episodes, 1977)
- Cindy (1978)
- Taxi (Executive producer, unknown episodes)
- The Associates (Executive producer, unknown episodes)
- Glory! Glory! (1989)
- For Richer, for Poorer (Supervising producer, 1992)
- The Kid (Executive producer, 2001)

=== Writer ===
- The Dean Martin Show (1 episode, 1965)
- The Bill Cosby Show (1 episode, 1970)
- Gene Kelly's Wonderful World of Girls (1970)
- Lily (1970)
- Phyllis (Unknown episodes)
- The Mary Tyler Moore Show (12 episodes, 1973–1977)
- Cindy (1978)
- Taxi (3 episodes, 1978)
- The Associates (13 episodes, 1979)
- Mr. Smith (5 episodes, 1983)
- The Lonely Guy (1984)
- Glory! Glory! (1989)
- Getting There (1990)
- Roc (1 episode, 1991)
  - Daniels wrote Roc's pilot episode, and was credited throughout the series' three-season run as creator.
- Faith (1991)
- For Richer, for Poorer (1992)
- The Substitute Wife (1994)
- The Kid (2001)

== Awards and nominations ==
Year	Award	Category	Title	Shared with	Result
1975	Primetime Emmy Awards	Outstanding Comedy Series	The Mary Tyler Moore Show	James L. Brooks, Allan Burns, Ed. Weinberger	Won
1975	Primetime Emmy Awards	Outstanding Writing in a Comedy Series	The Mary Tyler Moore Show: "Will Mary Richards Go to Jail?"	Ed. Weinberger	Won
1975	Writers Guild of America Awards	Episodic Comedy	The Mary Tyler Moore Show: "Will Mary Richards Go to Jail?"	Ed. Weinberger	Nominated
1976	Primetime Emmy Awards	Outstanding Comedy Series	The Mary Tyler Moore Show	James L. Brooks, Allan Burns, Ed. Weinberger	Won
1977	Primetime Emmy Awards	Outstanding Comedy Series	The Mary Tyler Moore Show	James L. Brooks, Allan Burns, Ed. Weinberger	Won
1977	Primetime Emmy Awards	Outstanding Writing in a Comedy Series	The Mary Tyler Moore Show: "The Last Show"	James L. Brooks, Allan Burns, Bob Ellison, David Lloyd, Ed. Weinberger	Won
1978	Writers Guild of America Awards	Episodic Comedy	The Mary Tyler Moore Show: "The Last Show"	James L. Brooks, Allan Burns, Bob Ellison, David Lloyd, Ed. Weinberger	Nominated
1979	Primetime Emmy Awards	Outstanding Comedy Series	Taxi	James L. Brooks, Glen Charles, Les Charles, David Davis, Ed. Weinberger	Won
1980	Primetime Emmy Awards	Outstanding Comedy Series	Taxi	James L. Brooks, Glen Charles, Les Charles, David Davis, Ed. Weinberger	Won
1980	Primetime Emmy Awards	Outstanding Writing in a Comedy Series	The Associates: "The Censors"	Ed. Weinberger	Nominated
1981	Primetime Emmy Award	Outstanding Comedy Series	Taxi	James L. Brooks, Glen Charles, Les Charles, David Davis, Ed. Weinberger	Won
1981	Writers Guild of America Awards	Episodic Comedy	The Associates: "The Censors"	Ed. Weinberger	Nominated
1982	Primetime Emmy Awards	Outstanding Comedy Series	Taxi	James L. Brooks, Glen Charles, Les Charles, Ken Estin, Howard Gewirtz, Ian Praiser, Richard Sakai, Ed. Weinberger	Nominated
1983	Primetime Emmy Awards	Outstanding Comedy Series	Taxi	James L. Brooks, Ken Estin, Richard Sakai, Sam Simon, Ed. Weinberger	Nominated
1989	Gemini Awards	Best Dramatic Mini-Series	Glory! Glory!	Bonny Dore, Jonathan Goodwill, Michael MacMillan, Seaton McLean	Nominated
1989	Gemini Awards	Best Writing in a Dramatic Program or Mini-Series	Glory! Glory!	Jacqueline Lefèvre	Nominated
1992	CINE Competition	CINE Golden Eagle	Monkey House	Bruce Campbell, Jonathan Goodwill, Allan King, Gordon Mark, Michael MacMillan, Harold Tichenor, Max E. Youngstein	Won
1993	CableACE Award	Dramatic or Theatrical Special	Monkey House: "Fortitude"	Chris Bailey, Michael MacMillan, Jonathan Goodwill, Wayne Tourell	Won
1993	CableACE Award	Writing in a Dramatic Series	Monkey House: "Fortitude"		Won
1993	Gemini Awards	Best Writing in a Dramatic Program or Mini-Series	Monkey House		Nominated
