= Lou Grant (TV series) =

American drama (1977–1982)

- Created by: James L. Brooks; Allan Burns; Gene Reynolds
- Based on: Lou Grant by James L. Brooks and Allan Burns
- Developed by: Leon Tokatyan
- Starring: Edward Asner; Robert Walden; Linda Kelsey; Mason Adams; Jack Bannon; Daryl Anderson; Nancy Marchand; Rebecca Balding
- Composers: Patrick Williams (majority of episodes); Artie Kane ("Pills"); Miles Goodman; Hod David Schudson; Les Hooper; James DiPasquale ("Bomb"); Shirley Walker; (incomplete listing)
- Country of origin: United States
- Original language: English
- No. of seasons: 5
- No. of episodes: 114 (list of episodes)

Production
- Executive producers: Allan Burns; James L. Brooks; Gene Reynolds
- Running time: 46–48 minutes
- Production company: MTM Productions

Original release
- Network: CBS
- Release: September 20, 1977 – September 13, 1982

Related
- The Mary Tyler Moore Show; Mary and Rhoda

Lou Grant is an American drama television series starring Ed Asner in the title role as a newspaper editor that aired on CBS from September 20, 1977, to September 13, 1982. The third spin-off (after Rhoda and Phyllis) of the American sitcom The Mary Tyler Moore Show, Lou Grant was created by James L. Brooks, Allan Burns, and Gene Reynolds.

Lou Grant won 13 Primetime Emmy Awards, including Outstanding Drama Series twice. Asner received the Primetime Emmy Award for Outstanding Lead Actor in a Drama Series in 1978 and 1980. In doing so, he became the first person to win an Emmy Award for both Outstanding Lead Actor in a Drama Series and Outstanding Supporting Actor in a Comedy Series for portraying the same character. Lou Grant also won two Golden Globe Awards, a Peabody Award, an Eddie Award, three awards from the Directors Guild of America, and two Humanitas Prizes.

== Summary and setting ==
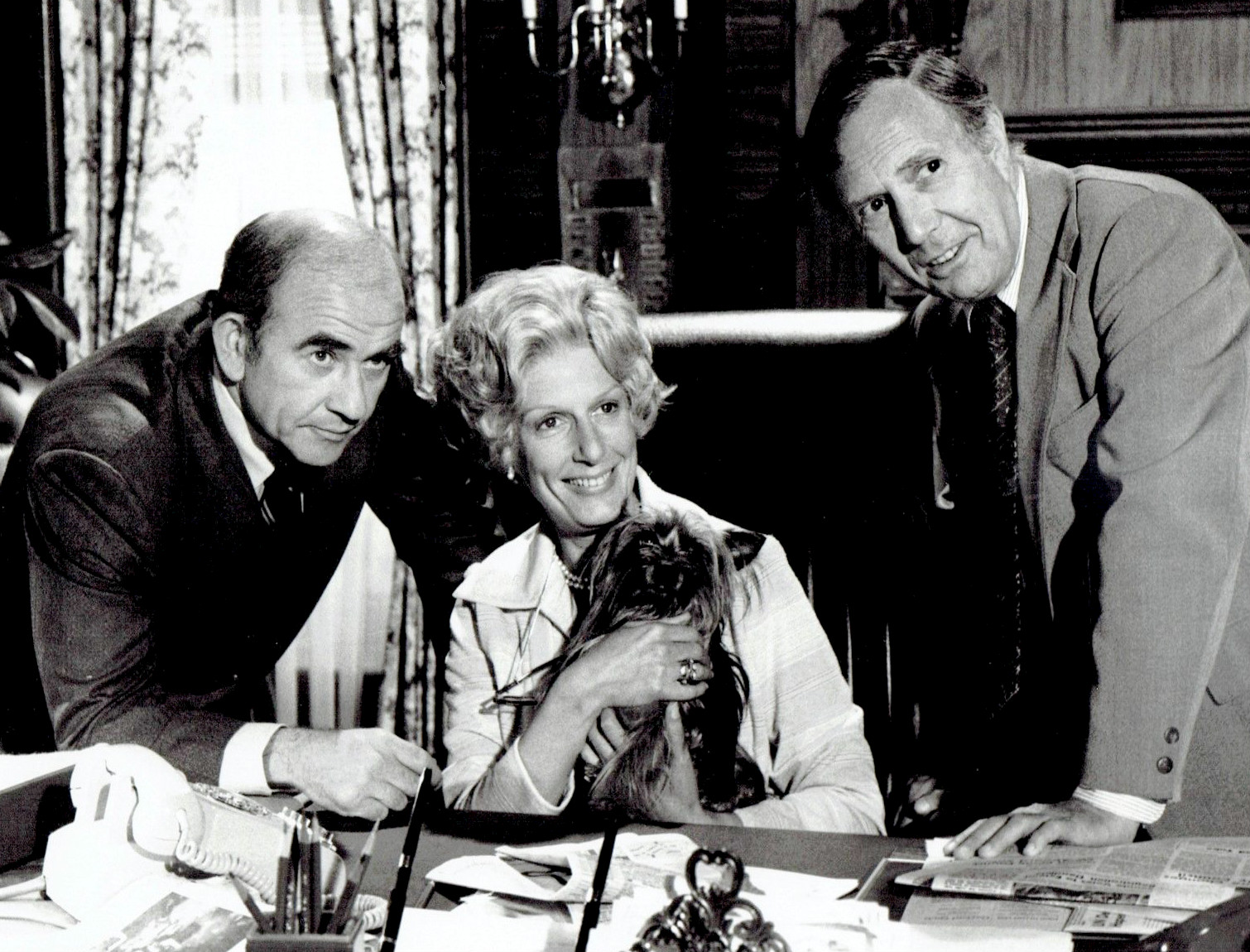
Ed Asner, Nancy Marchand and Mason Adams (1977)

Lou Grant works as city editor of the fictional Los Angeles Tribune daily newspaper, a job he takes after being fired from WJM-TV in Minneapolis at the end of the sitcom The Mary Tyler Moore Show. (Grant mentions several times on Mary Tyler Moore that he had begun his career as a print journalist.)

Given the shift from comedy to drama in this show, Lou becomes a less eccentric character: more diplomatic, sober, and professional. The only other character from the earlier series is a single appearance by Flo Meredith, a veteran journalist (played in three episodes by Eileen Heckart) with whom Lou had a fling.

The rest of the main cast includes: general-assignment reporters Joe Rossi (Robert Walden) and Billie Newman (Linda Kelsey); managing editor Charles Hume (Mason Adams), an old friend of Lou's who has convinced him to move from Minneapolis to Los Angeles; assistant city editor Art Donovan (Jack Bannon); photographer Dennis Price (Daryl Anderson), usually referred to as "Animal"; and widowed, patrician publisher Margaret Jones Pynchon (Nancy Marchand), a character loosely based on a composite of real-life newspaper executives Dorothy Chandler of the Los Angeles Times and Katharine Graham of The Washington Post. Recurring actors who play editors of various departments included Gordon Jump and Emilio Delgado; Peggy McCay has a recurring role as Charlie Hume's wife Marion.

The episodes often have Grant assigning Rossi and Billie to cover news stories, with the plots revealing problems experienced by the people being covered as well as the frustrations and challenges faced by the reporters as they worked to get the story. The younger reporters are frequently seen turning to Lou for guidance and mentorship over some of the hard questions and moral dilemmas they experience as they work on their stories. The series frequently delves into serious social issues, such as nuclear proliferation, mental illness, prostitution, gay rights, domestic violence, capital punishment, child abuse, rape, and chemical pollution, in addition to demonstrating coverage of breaking news stories of all kinds. There is one character on Lou Grant, reporter Rosenthal, who is mentioned frequently but never seen.

The series also undertakes serious examination of ethical questions in journalism, including plagiarism, checkbook journalism, entrapment of sources, staging news photos, and conflicts of interest that journalists encounter in their work. There are also glimpses into the personal lives of the Tribune staff.

== Cast ==
=== Starring ===
The following actors were listed in the opening credits:

- Ed Asner as Lou Grant (city editor)
- Mason Adams as Charlie Hume (managing editor)
- Daryl Anderson as Dennis "Animal" Price (photographer)
- Rebecca Balding as Carla Mardigan (reporter) (episodes 1–3 only)
- Jack Bannon as Art Donovan (assistant city editor)
- Linda Kelsey as Billie Newman (reporter) (from episode 4 on)
- Nancy Marchand as Margaret Jones Pynchon (publisher)
- Robert Walden as Joe Rossi (reporter)

=== Recurring cast ===
The following actors were seen in recurring roles:

- Sidney Clute as national editor (season 1, from episode 19, to season 4)
- Emilio Delgado as Ruben Castillo (national editor) (seasons 2–5)
- Barbara Edelman as Linda (seasons 4–5) (Edelman also frequently appeared in various bit roles, seasons 1–4)
- Michael Irving as Jayson (newsroom staff)
- Laurence Haddon as McGrath (foreign editor)
- Peter Hobbs as George Driscoll (reporter) (seasons 1–4)
- Gordon Jump as Al (national editor) (season 1, through episode 10)
- Peggy McCay as Marion Hume
- Wallace Rooney as Tim Butterfield (security guard) (season 1)
- Allen Williams as Adam Wilson (financial editor)

== Production ==
When The Mary Tyler Moore Show ended its run, that series' co-creators and producers, James L. Brooks and Allan Burns, had a commitment to create a new show starring Ed Asner. They decided that it was easier to retain the popular Lou Grant character and make it a spinoff series. Mary Tyler Moore had already established that the character had a previous newspaper career. Brooks and Burns' decision to make the spinoff series a one-hour realistic drama instead of another 30-minute sitcom was influenced by the 1976 film All the President's Men, and how that movie depicted the operation of a major newspaper. The show remains a rare example of a dramatic series spun-off from a sitcom.

Gene Reynolds, who was producing the TV show M*A*S*H at the same time, was also brought on as a co-creator and executive producer. Reynolds, Brooks and Burns had previously worked on the series Room 222, and Lou Grant made occasional reference to Walt Whitman High School, the setting of Room 222. Gary David Goldberg was a producer for the series. The theme music to Lou Grant was composed by Patrick Williams.

== Broadcast history ==
Lou Grant aired on CBS from September 1977 to September 1982. A total of 114 episodes were produced. In the second half of the 1990s, in syndication, the show was carried on cable TV's A&E Network.

== Episodes ==
Season	Episodes	Originally released		Rank
Season	Episodes	First released	Last released	Rank
1	22	September 20, 1977	March 20, 1978	36
2	24	September 25, 1978	May 7, 1979	30
3	24	September 17, 1979	March 24, 1980	—N/a
4	20	September 22, 1980	May 4, 1981	27
5	24	November 2, 1981	September 13, 1982	38

== Awards ==
Lou Grant won several critical honors during its run, including 13 Primetime Emmy Awards, two Golden Globe Awards, a Peabody Award, and two Humanitas Prizes.

Asner won two Emmys for his portrayal of Grant; Marchand won an Emmy for "Outstanding Supporting Actress in a Drama Series" four of the five years the series ran; Walden, Kelsey, and Adams all received multiple nominations for supporting Emmys.

== Cancellation ==
The cancellation of Lou Grant in 1982 was controversial. Asner served two terms as president of the Screen Actors Guild, during which he voiced opposition to U.S. government policy in Central America and worked closely with Medical Aid for El Salvador. Up until his death in 2021, Asner consistently stated his position that his political views, as well as the publicity they attracted, were the root causes of the cancellation of the show. CBS denied that the cancellation had anything to do with Asner's politics, citing a fall in ratings for the last two seasons. The show's ratings had fallen from an average 19.6 rating over the previous three seasons to 16.6 in its final year, finishing the season 43rd among primetime network series.

== Home media ==
Shout! Factory has released all five seasons on DVD in Region 1.

Home media releases of Lou Grant
DVD Name	Ep #	Release Date
The Complete First Season	22	May 24, 2016
The Complete Second Season	24	August 16, 2016
The Complete Third Season	24	November 22, 2016
The Complete Fourth Season	20	February 21, 2017
The Complete Fifth and Final Season	24	March 13, 2018
