= Dear John (American TV series) =

American sitcom (1988–1992)

- Original cast
- Genre: Sitcom
- Based on: Dear John by John Sullivan
- Developed by: Bob Ellison; Peter Noah
- Starring: Judd Hirsch; Isabella Hofmann; Jane Carr; Harry Groener; Billie Bird; Jere Burns; Tom Willett
- Theme music composer: John Sullivan
- Opening theme: "Dear John" by Wendy Talbot
- Country of origin: United States
- Original language: English
- No. of seasons: 4
- No. of episodes: 90 (4 unaired) (list of episodes)

Production
- Executive producers: Hal Cooper; Bob Ellison; Rod Parker; Peter Noah; Ed. Weinberger
- Camera setup: Multi-camera
- Running time: 30 minutes
- Production companies: Ed Weinberger Productions; Paramount Television

Original release
- Network: NBC
- Release: October 6, 1988 – July 22, 1992

Related
- Dear John (1986)

Dear John is an American sitcom television series that aired on NBC from October 6, 1988, to July 22, 1992. It was originally based on the British sitcom of the same name. It was retitled Dear John USA when it was shown in the United Kingdom. During its four-season run, it was bounced to and from various time periods on Wednesday, Thursday, Friday, and Saturday nights. It moved from its post-Cheers slot on Thursdays to a post-Night Court slot on Wednesdays in 1990.

== Synopsis ==
The sitcom is set in New York City. Judd Hirsch stars as John Lacey, a teacher at a preparatory school in Manhattan. After ten years of marriage, one day he returns home and finds a Dear John letter: His wife, Wendy, is leaving him for his best friend. When the court grants Wendy the house and custody of their son, Matthew, John moves into an apartment in the Rego Park neighborhood of Queens. The building is actually 27-56 27 Street in Astoria, Queens. When he later moves, he moves one street away to 28-28 29 Street, also in Astoria, Queens.

Six months after the divorce, John joins the One-To-One Club, a support group for people who are divorced and single. The series chronicles John's life and the lives of his new friends at the One-to-One Club.

== Characters ==
The original group consisted of:

- John Lacey (Judd Hirsch), a school teacher who tries—not always successfully—to keep his life from falling apart after his acrimonious, financially devastating divorce.
- Louise Mercer (Jane Carr), the founder and leader of the One-to-One Club, an Englishwoman whose conversation frequently returns to the topic of sex. (Her catchphrase, usually said as people discuss their previous relationships: "Were there any ... sexual problems?") Has a child named Nigel out of wedlock in season 2.
- Kirk Morris (Jere Burns), a cocky, self-styled ladies' man who is a preening narcissist and habitual liar.
- Kate McCarron (Isabella Hofmann), a beautiful divorcée with some self-image issues. She and John share an attraction, but she eventually marries a police officer in season 4, while remaining a regular attendee at club meetings. Kate also opens a restaurant ("Kate's Place") in season 4.
- Ralph Drang (Harry Groener), a shy, unconfident milquetoast who works as a tollbooth collector. His marriage lasted less than 6 hours; his Bulgarian wife (who married him only to avoid being deported) deserted him at the wedding reception. Noted for his extremely nasal, whining voice, and his propensity for being manipulated by Kirk. Seen only in seasons 1-3; he 'graduates' from the group after his new girlfriend moves in with him.
- Bonnie Philbert (Billie Bird), a talkative retiree who often makes references of her sexually adventurous past. Seen infrequently in the very earliest episodes, Mrs. Philbert effectively becomes a regular by mid-season 1.
- Tom (Tom Willett), a very tall and extremely quiet man, almost always seen sporting a bow-tie. He does not actually ever speak at any meeting, and usually sits near the back—but eventually becomes Mrs. Philbert's ongoing boyfriend.

Later additions were:

- Mary Beth Sutton (Susan Walters), a beautiful, naive young Southerner from a wealthy background. She eventually finds work as a soap opera writer. Added midway through season 2, staying through the end of the series.
- Denise (Olivia Brown), who frequently drops by group meetings as she attends the weight control group across the hall at the community center. Seen only in season 3, beginning partway through.
- Ben Conners (William O'Leary), a maintenance man at the Rego Park Community Center. He becomes involved with Louise and is friendly with the group. Seen throughout season 4.
- Annie Marino (Marietta DePrima), an aspiring actress who joins the group after her boyfriend deserts their relationship and sublets their apartment to Kirk without telling her. Added partway through season 4.

Recurring characters:

- Wendy Lacey (Carlene Watkins in season 1, Deborah Harmon in seasons 3-4), John's ex-wife. Though she left John, she later decides she wants another child with him. She goes to extreme lengths to make this happen without trying to actually win him back.
- Matthew Lacey (Ben Savage in seasons 1-2, Billy Cohen in season 3), John's school age son who lives with his mother. John and Matthew have a good relationship, despite their limited time together.
- Brad Durman (Peter Jurasik), an often-weaselly fellow teacher of John's. Seen in seasons 2-3.
- Dr. Hendricks (Raye Birk), the headmaster at the school where John teaches. Seen in seasons 2-4.
- Chow Ling (Cu Ba Nguyen), a recent immigrant who attends meetings in the community center both to learn English and to quit smoking. Seen in seasons 2-3.
- Mitch Kurland (Greg Salata), a police officer who marries Kate. Seen in season 4 only.
- Curtis (Ruben Santiago-Hudson) and Calvin (Tim Jones), employees at Kate's Place. Seen in season 4 only.

== Episodes ==
Season	Episodes	Originally released		Rank	Rating
Season	Episodes	First released	Last released	Rank	Rating
1	22	October 6, 1988	May 11, 1989	11	18.5
2	24	September 28, 1989	May 16, 1990	17	17.2
3	22	September 19, 1990	May 1, 1991	50	—N/a
4	22	September 19, 1991	July 22, 1992	77	—N/a

== Reception ==
=== Critical response ===
John Leonard of New York magazine previewed the pilot episode, in which John Lacey tries to attend a support group "for the recently singled", and stumbles instead into a meeting of Alcoholics Anonymous. "I found this funny, and maybe even profound," Leonard wrote. NBC launched the show two days before Empty Nest, another sitcom about a middle-aged man who recently lost his wife. "Some talented people run around in them agreeably," said Leonard, commenting on both shows.

=== Ratings ===
In its first season, the sitcom was part of NBC's Thursday night lineup. It attracted the eleventh largest audience of all prime time television programs in the United States for the 1988–89 season. Its viewer share (as recorded in Nielsen ratings) declined in later seasons. NBC moved its time slot several times.

Season	Viewers (millions)	Rank (by audience share)	References
1 (1988–89)	18.5	11	
2 (1989–90)	17.1	17	
3 (1990–91)	?	50	
4 (1991–92)	?	77	

Paramount Domestic Television sold the show into syndication after Dear John ended its run in 1992.

It currently airs reruns on Rewind TV as of 2026.

=== Awards ===
In "Stand By Your Man", the thirteenth episode of the first season, Cleavon Little makes a guest appearance as a closeted gay man whose marriage to a woman has just ended. His performance won him a Primetime Emmy Award for Outstanding Guest Actor in a Comedy Series at the 41st Primetime Emmy Awards in 1989. Judd Hirsch won a Golden Globe for Best Actor in a Comedy in 1989 and was nominated again the following year.
