= When Flanders Failed =

- The Simpsons episode
- Episode no.: Season 3 Episode 3
- Directed by: Jim Reardon
- Written by: Jon Vitti
- Production code: 7F23
- Original air date: October 3, 1991

Episode features
- Chalkboard gag: "Nobody likes sunburn slappers"
- Couch gag: The Simpsons run into the living room, do a 'Walk Like an Egyptian' shuffle, and finish with a 'ta-da' pose on the couch.
- Commentary: Matt Groening; Al Jean; Mike Reiss; Jon Vitti; Jim Reardon

Episode chronology
| ← Previous "Mr. Lisa Goes to Washington" | Next → "Bart the Murderer" |
- The Simpsons season 3

"When Flanders Failed" is the third episode of the third season of the American animated television series The Simpsons. It originally aired on Fox in the United States on October 3, 1991. In the episode, Homer makes a wish for Ned Flanders' new left-handed store to go out of business. The wish comes true and soon the Flanders family is in financial trouble. When he discovers that Ned's house is about to be repossessed, Homer feels guilty. He helps the store flourish by telling all of Springfield's left-handed residents to patronize it. Meanwhile, Bart takes karate lessons but quits after it does not turn out to be as interesting as he had hoped.

The episode was written by Jon Vitti and directed by Jim Reardon. It had an unusual amount of animation glitches because the animation studio was training a new group of animators. The episode references It's a Wonderful Life. The title is a reference to the poem "In Flanders Fields".

Since airing, the episode has received mostly positive reviews from television critics. It acquired a Nielsen rating of 13.9, and was the highest-rated show on Fox the week it aired.

== Plot ==
Ned Flanders invites the Simpson family to a barbecue where he announces plans to quit the pharmaceutical business and open the Leftorium, a store for left-handed people. While pulling a wishbone with Ned, Homer—jealous of Ned's material success—wishes for the Leftorium to fail and go out of business. Undeterred after Lisa scolds him for indulging in schadenfreude, Homer gloats when Ned tells him business is slow. Afterwards, Homer keeps seeing left-handed citizens struggling with items made for right-handed people (including his boss, Mr. Burns) and considers telling them about the Leftorium, but decides not to.

In the B-story, Bart begins taking karate lessons at Akira's karate school. He soon finds himself bored with karate, so he decides to skip each lesson and play video games at the mall arcade instead. Whenever Bart is asked by his friends and family about the karate techniques he is learning, he refers to the Touch of Death, an ability he sees in one of the arcade games he plays. He proceeds to terrorize Lisa into doing his will by threatening her with the Touch of Death. When the school bullies take Lisa's saxophone, she tells them Bart will defend her with the Touch of Death. Unable to actually defend himself or his sister, Bart is beaten up by the bullies and is left hanging by his underwear from a nearby basketball hoop. Having reclaimed her saxophone, Lisa wistfully notes that sometimes two wrongs do make a right.

Eventually the store closes, plunging the Flanders family into debt and misery. Ned is forced to sell his possessions, and Homer gleefully buys many of them for a pittance. Overcome by regret, Homer decides to return Ned's possessions, but he finds Ned's house repossessed and the family living in their car. Homer tells Ned to open the store one final time and informs all the left-handed residents of Springfield about the Leftorium; they descend upon the store and buy almost everything; Mr. Burns buys the roadster with left-handed shift. The business boom helps Ned keep the store open and get his house back. Todd Flanders leads a chorus of "Put On a Happy Face".

== Production ==
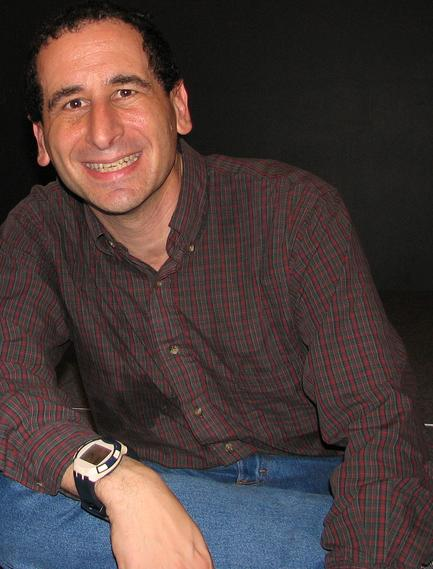
Mike Reiss said he remembers "When Flanders Failed" as the episode with "a thousand mistakes in it".

The episode was written by Jon Vitti and directed by Jim Reardon. It featured an unusual number of animation glitches because the animation studio in Korea was training a new group of animators, and this episode was one of their first efforts. Show runner Mike Reiss said he will always remember it as the episode "that came back animated with a thousand mistakes in it and was just a complete and utter mess". Reardon said there was "literally a mistake in every other scene" when the episode came back from Korea. Several scenes had to be re-animated in the United States because of these glitches, but according to Reardon, "you can still see the lesser ones that got through, such as line quality problems particularly in the first act." Though it aired in season three, "When Flanders Failed" was produced during the previous season. It was recorded in spring 1991 when the previous season had ended, and was scheduled to air in autumn. The staff therefore had more time to fix the glitches during the summer. Unlike the season premiere "Stark Raving Dad", which was originally the final episode in the season two production run, this episode was not presented in Dolby Surround and uses the season two Danny Elfman arrangement of the opening and closing themes rather than the Alf Clausen arrangement.

"When Flanders Failed" features the second appearance of the character Akira, voiced by Hank Azaria. He was previously seen in the season two episode "One Fish, Two Fish, Blowfish, Blue Fish", where he is a waiter at a Japanese restaurant and was originally voiced by George Takei. It is revealed in this episode that the characters Ned Flanders, Moe Szyslak and Montgomery Burns are left-handed, just like The Simpsons creator Matt Groening. The Simpsons writer George Meyer came up with the idea of The Leftorium when the creators were trying to figure out what Ned's failed business would be. The inspiration came from a family friend of the Meyer family who had opened a left-handed store that was quickly forced to close down due to lack of business.

== Cultural references ==
The title is a reference to the poem "In Flanders Fields". Homer watches the Canadian Football League Draft on television; the names of the teams are real, but Simpsons writers Jay Kogen, Wallace Wolodarsky, and John Swartzwelder appear on the draft list. The smoke from Flanders's barbecue forms fingers that seem to come out of the TV, a reference to Poltergeist. Akira's school is located in the mall next to Shakespeare's Fried Chicken, a reference to the English poet and playwright William Shakespeare. Mr. Burns says "My kingdom for a left-handed can-opener!", a reference to the line "My kingdom for a horse!" in Shakespeare's Richard III. Akira gives Bart's karate class the ancient Chinese military treatise The Art of War by Sun Tzu. Richard Sakai is seen in one of the crowd shots at The Leftorium. The final scene is based on the ending of It's a Wonderful Life (1946), with Maude's dress and mannerisms modeled after Donna Reed. The episode closes with a rendition of "Put On a Happy Face" from Bye Bye Birdie.

== Reception ==
In its original American broadcast, "When Flanders Failed" finished 29th in the ratings for the week of September 30 – October 6, 1991, with a Nielsen rating of 13.9, equivalent to approximately 12.8 million viewing households. It was the highest-rated show on Fox that week.

Since airing, the episode has received mostly positive reviews from television critics. Kirk Baird of the Las Vegas Sun named it the fifth best episode of The Simpsons, and Central Michigan Life called it an "instant classic". Pete Oliva of North Texas Daily said the episode "proves that it is possible to laugh and cry at the same time without being able to control either response". Bill Gibron of DVD Verdict said "When Flanders Failed" shows that even if The Simpsons is not dealing with famous celebrities or "high profile places", the writers can still "wring uproarious comedy out of their cast of regulars. Flanders is a special creation in the canon of humor, a regular guy who is funny because of how hyper-normal he is compared to his Neanderthal neighbors. The focus on people who are left-handed, and the whole idea of being a lefty, is an unusual basis for a television show. But then again, nothing about The Simpsons is ever common."

Hock Guan Teh of DVD Town also praised the writers, saying they "are able to craft a downtrodden tale for the perpetually clueless Flanders family that serves to illustrate how dark emotions can eventually be overcome by Homer's guilt. A memorable episode." Niel Harvey of The Roanoke Times called "When Flanders Failed" a "classic bit of Simpsonia". The episode's reference to It's a Wonderful Life was named the 26th greatest film reference in the history of the show by Total Film's Nathan Ditum. Nate Meyers of Digitally Obsessed rated the episode a 3 1/2 (of 5) and commented that "perhaps it is not profound in its examination of jealousy causing people to behave irrationally, but it handles the topic in a serious manner while not compromising the show's humor. The side story with Bart stems from the era of the series when Bart was the big star, but it still has some funny bits."

DVD Movie Guide's Colin Jacobson wrote: "Mean Homer equals Funny Homer, so 'When Flanders Failed' presents an above average show. He seems unusually crude here, which makes him amusing. The subplot with Bart and his karate class also adds good material, especially when he threatens to turn the 'Touch of Death' on Lisa. Another sappy finish slightly mars this one, but it remains generally solid." Kimberly Potts of AOL named it tenth best episode of the show and commented: "Schadenfreude is the theme of this tight episode about Homer's joy at the failure of Flanders' Leftorium store. There are few times Homer is more shamelessly smug than he was while imitating Flanders and using Ned's yard sale grill, and we haven't even mentioned Bart's 'Touch of Death' subplot." Winston-Salem Journal's Tim Clodfelter called it an "outstanding" episode.
