= List of awards and nominations received by Matt Groening =

Matt Groening awards and nominations
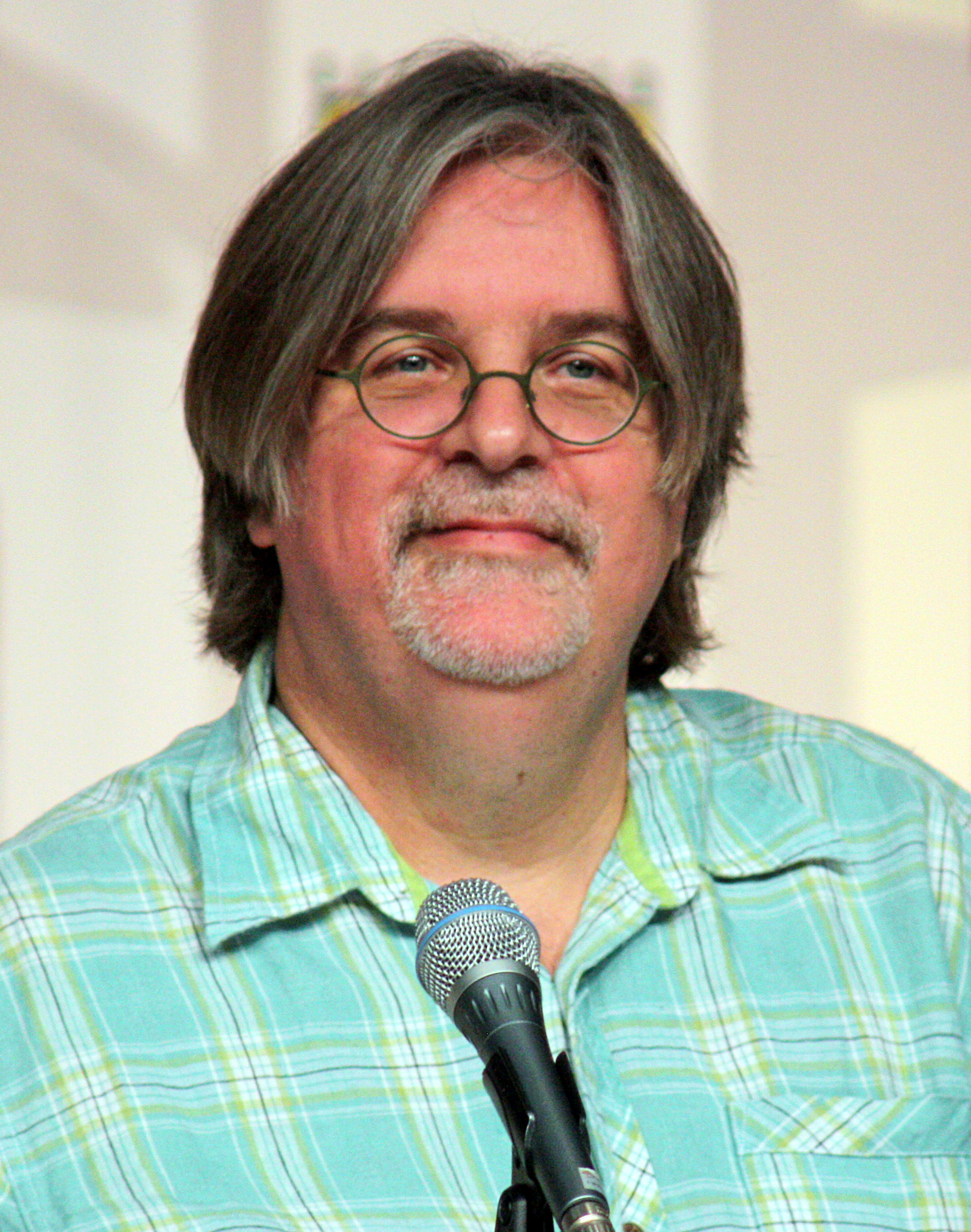
- Groening at the 2009 San Diego Comic-Con
Awards and nominations
Award	Wins	Nominations

Totals (Note: Certain award groups do not simply award one winner. They acknowledge several different recipients, have runners-up, and have third place. Since this is a specific recognition and is different from losing an award, runner-up mentions are considered wins in this award tally. For simplification and to avoid errors, each award in this list has been presumed to have had a prior nomination.)
- Wins: 98
- Nominations: 227

The following is a list of awards and nominations received by American cartoonist, writer, producer, and animator Matt Groening.

== Annie Awards ==
Year	Award	Nominated work	Result
1992	Best Animated Television Production	The Simpsons	Won
1993	Best Animated Television Production	The Simpsons	Won
1994	Best Animated Television Production	The Simpsons	Won
1995	Best Animated Television Production	The Simpsons	Won
1996	Best Animated Television Production	The Simpsons	Won
1997	Best Animated Television Production	The Simpsons	Won
1998	Outstanding Achievement in an Animated Primetime or Late Night Television Program	The Simpsons	Won
1999	Outstanding Achievement in an Animated Television Program	The Simpsons	Won
1999	Outstanding Achievement in an Animated Television Program	Futurama	Nominated
2000	Outstanding Achievement in an Animated Primetime or Late Night Television Program	The Simpsons	Won
2000	Outstanding Achievement in an Animated Primetime or Late Night Television Program	Futurama	Nominated
2001	Outstanding Achievement in an Animated Primetime or Late Night Television Program	The Simpsons	Won
2001	Outstanding Achievement in an Animated Primetime or Late Night Television Program	Futurama	Nominated
2002	Outstanding Achievement in an Animated Television Production	The Simpsons	Won
2002	Outstanding Achievement in an Animated Television Production	Futurama	Nominated
2003	Best Animated Television Production	The Simpsons	Won
2003	Best Animated Television Production	Futurama	Nominated
2004	Best Animated Television Production	The Simpsons	Won
2008	Best Animated Feature	The Simpsons Movie	Nominated
2008	Writing in a Feature Production	The Simpsons Movie	Won
2008	Best Animated Television Production	The Simpsons	Nominated
2008	Best Animated Home Entertainment	Futurama: Bender's Big Score	Won
2009	Best Animated Television Production	The Simpsons	Nominated
2009	Best Animated Home Entertainment	Futurama: The Beast with a Billion Backs	Won
2010	Best Animated Television Production	The Simpsons	Nominated
2010	Best Animated Television Production	Futurama	Won
2010	Best Animated Home Entertainment	Futurama: Into the Wild Green Yonder	Won
2011	Best Animated Television Production	The Simpsons	Won
2011	Best Animated Television Production	Futurama	Nominated
2011	Winsor McCay Award		Won
2012	Best General Audience Animated Television Production	The Simpsons	Won
2013	Best Animated Short Subject	The Longest Daycare	Nominated
2014	Best General Audience Animated Television Production	Futurama	Won
2015	Best General Audience Animated Television Production	The Simpsons	Won
2016	Best General Audience Animated Television Production	The Simpsons	Won
2017	Best General Audience Animated Television Production	The Simpsons	Nominated
2023	Best Mature Audience Animated Television/Broadcast Production	The Simpsons	Nominated

== Environmental Media Awards ==
Year	Award	Nominated work	Result
1991	Best Television Episodic Comedy	The Simpsons for "Two Cars in Every Garage and Three Eyes on Every Fish"	Won
1992	Best Television Episodic Comedy	The Simpsons for "Mr. Lisa Goes to Washington"	Nominated
1994	Best Television Episodic Comedy	The Simpsons for "Bart Gets an Elephant"	Won
1996	Best Television Episodic Comedy	The Simpsons for "Lisa the Vegetarian"	Won
1997	Best Television Episodic Comedy	The Simpsons for "The Old Man and the Lisa"	Won
2000	Best Television Episodic Comedy	Futurama for "The Problem with Popplers"	Won
2002	Best Television Episodic Comedy	The Simpsons for "Brawl in the Family"	Nominated
2003	Best Television Episodic Comedy	The Simpsons for ''Scuse Me While I Miss the Sky"	Nominated
2004	Best Television Episodic Comedy	The Simpsons for "The Fat and the Furriest'	Won
2005	Best Television Episodic Comedy	The Simpsons for "On a Clear Day I Can't See My Sister"	Nominated
2005	Turner Award	The Simpsons for "Goo Goo Gai Pan"	Nominated
2006	Best Television Episodic Comedy	The Simpsons for "Bonfire of the Manatees"	Won
2007	Best Television Episodic Comedy	The Simpsons for "The Wife Aquatic"	Nominated
2008	Best Feature Film	The Simpsons Movie	Nominated
2009	Best Television Episodic Comedy	The Simpsons for "The Burns and the Bees"	Nominated
2011	Best Television Episodic Comedy	Futurama for "The Futurama Holiday Spectacular"	Won
2015	Best Television Episodic Comedy	The Simpsons for "Opposites A-Frack"	Won
2016	Best Television Episodic Comedy	The Simpsons for "Teenage Mutant Milk-Caused Hurdles"	Won
2017	Best Television Episodic Comedy	The Simpsons for "Trust but Clarify"	Nominated

== Golden Globe Awards ==
Year	Award/Category	Nominated work	Result
2003	Best Television Series – Musical or Comedy	The Simpsons	Nominated
2008	Best Motion Picture – Animated	The Simpsons Movie	Nominated

== People's Choice Awards ==
Year	Award	Nominated work	Result
1991	Favorite New TV Comedy Series	The Simpsons	Won
1992	Favorite Series Among Young People	The Simpsons	Nominated
2006	Favorite TV Comedy	The Simpsons	Won
2007	Favorite Animated Comedy	The Simpsons	Won
2008	Favorite Movie Comedy	The Simpsons Movie	Nominated
2008	Favorite Animated Comedy	The Simpsons	Won
2009	Favorite Animated Comedy	The Simpsons	Won
2011	Favorite TV Family	The Simpsons for The Simpsons	Won
2015	Favorite Animated TV Show	The Simpsons	Won
2016	Favorite Animated TV Show	The Simpsons	Won
2017	Favorite Animated TV Show	The Simpsons	Won

== Primetime Emmy Awards ==
Year	Award	Nominated work	Result
1987	Outstanding Writing for a Variety or Music Program	The Tracey Ullman Show	Nominated
1988	Outstanding Writing for a Variety or Music Program	The Tracey Ullman Show	Nominated
1989	Outstanding Writing for a Variety or Music Program	The Tracey Ullman Show	Nominated
1990	Outstanding Animated Program (for Programming Less Than One Hour)	The Simpsons for "Life on the Fast Lane"	Won
1990	Outstanding Animated Program (for Programming Less Than One Hour)	The Simpsons for "Simpsons Roasting on an Open Fire"	Nominated
1991	Outstanding Animated Program (for Programming Less Than One Hour)	The Simpsons for "Homer vs. Lisa and the 8th Commandment"	Won
1992	Outstanding Animated Program (for Programming Less Than One Hour)	The Simpsons for "Radio Bart"	Nominated
1995	Outstanding Animated Program (for Programming Less Than One Hour)	The Simpsons for "Lisa's Wedding"	Won
1996	Outstanding Animated Program (for Programming Less Than One Hour)	The Simpsons for "Treehouse of Horror VI"	Nominated
1997	Outstanding Animated Program (for Programming Less Than One Hour)	The Simpsons for "Homer's Phobia"	Won
1998	Outstanding Animated Program (for Programming Less Than One Hour)	The Simpsons for "Trash of the Titans"	Won
1999	Outstanding Animated Program (for Programming Less Than One Hour)	Futurama for "A Big Piece of Garbage"	Nominated
1999	Outstanding Animated Program (for Programming Less Than One Hour)	The Simpsons for "Viva Ned Flanders"	Nominated
2000	Outstanding Animated Program (for Programming More than One Hour)	Olive, the Other Reindeer	Nominated
2000	Outstanding Animated Program (for Programming One Hour or Less)	The Simpsons for "Behind the Laughter"	Won
2001	Outstanding Animated Program (for Programming One Hour or Less)	Futurama for "Amazon Women in the Mood"	Nominated
2001	Outstanding Animated Program (for Programming One Hour or Less)	The Simpsons for "HOMR"	Won
2002	Outstanding Animated Program (for Programming One Hour or Less)	Futurama for "Roswell That Ends Well"	Won
2002	Outstanding Animated Program (for Programming One Hour or Less)	The Simpsons for "She of Little Faith"	Nominated
2003	Outstanding Animated Program (for Programming One Hour or Less)	Futurama for "Jurassic Bark"	Nominated
2003	Outstanding Animated Program (for Programming One Hour or Less)	The Simpsons for "Three Gays of the Condo"	Won
2004	Outstanding Animated Program (for Programming One Hour or Less)	Futurama for "The Sting"	Nominated
2004	Outstanding Animated Program (for Programming One Hour or Less)	The Simpsons for "The Way We Weren't"	Nominated
2005	Outstanding Animated Program (for Programming One Hour or Less)	The Simpsons for "Future-Drama"	Nominated
2006	Outstanding Animated Program (for Programming One Hour or Less)	The Simpsons for "The Seemingly Never-Ending Story"	Won
2007	Outstanding Animated Program (for Programming One Hour or Less)	The Simpsons for "The Haw-Hawed Couple"	Nominated
2008	Outstanding Animated Program (for Programming One Hour or Less)	The Simpsons for "Eternal Moonshine of the Simpson Mind"	Won
2009	Outstanding Animated Program (for Programming One Hour or Less)	The Simpsons for "Gone Maggie Gone"	Nominated
2010	Outstanding Animated Program	The Simpsons for "Once Upon a Time in Springfield"	Nominated
2011	Outstanding Animated Program	Futurama for "The Late Philip J. Fry"	Won
2011	Outstanding Animated Program	The Simpsons for "Angry Dad: The Movie"	Nominated
2012	Outstanding Animated Program	Futurama for "The Tip of the Zoidberg"	Nominated
2012	Outstanding Animated Program	The Simpsons for "Holidays of Future Passed"	Nominated
2013	Outstanding Animated Program	The Simpsons for "Treehouse of Horror XXIII"	Nominated
2014	Outstanding Animated Program	Futurama for "Meanwhile"	Nominated
2015	Outstanding Animated Program	The Simpsons for "Treehouse of Horror XXV"	Nominated
2016	Outstanding Animated Program	The Simpsons for "Halloween of Horror"	Nominated
2017	Outstanding Animated Program	The Simpsons for "The Town"	Nominated
2017	Original Creative Achievement in Interactive Media within a Scripted Program	The Simpsons for Planet of the Couches	Nominated
2018	Outstanding Animated Program	The Simpsons for "Gone Boy"	Nominated
2019	Outstanding Animated Program	The Simpsons for "Mad About the Toy"	Won
2020	Outstanding Animated Program	The Simpsons for "Thanksgiving of Horror"	Nominated
2021	Outstanding Animated Program	The Simpsons for "The Dad-Feelings Limited"	Nominated
2021	Outstanding Short Form Animated Program	The Simpsons for "The Force Awakens from Its Nap"	Nominated
2022	Outstanding Animated Program	The Simpsons for "Pixelated and Afraid"	Nominated
2022	Outstanding Short Form Animated Program	The Simpsons for "When Billie Met Lisa"	Nominated
2023	Outstanding Animated Program	The Simpsons for "Treehouse of Horror XXXIII"	Won
2024	Outstanding Animated Program	The Simpsons for "Night of the Living Wage"	Nominated
2025	Outstanding Animated Program	The Simpsons for "Bart's Birthday"	Nominated

== TCA Awards ==
Year	Award	Nominated work	Result
1990	Outstanding Achievement in Comedy	The Simpsons	Won
1990	Program of the Year	The Simpsons	Nominated
1991	Outstanding Achievement in Comedy	The Simpsons	Nominated
1992	Program of the Year	The Simpsons	Nominated
1992	Outstanding Achievement in Comedy	The Simpsons	Nominated
1993	Program of the Year	The Simpsons	Nominated
1993	Outstanding Achievement in Comedy	The Simpsons	Nominated
1994	Outstanding Achievement in Comedy	The Simpsons	Nominated
1996	Outstanding Achievement in Comedy	The Simpsons	Nominated
1999	Individual Achievement in Comedy	The Simpsons and Futurama	Nominated
2002	Heritage Award	The Simpsons	Won

== Teen Choice Awards ==
Year	Award	Nominated work	Result
2000	Choice TV Show: Comedy	The Simpsons	Nominated
2001	Choice TV Show: Comedy	The Simpsons	Nominated
2002	Choice TV Show: Comedy	The Simpsons	Nominated
2004	Choice TV Show: Comedy	The Simpsons	Nominated
2005	Choice TV Show: Comedy	The Simpsons	Nominated
2006	Choice Animated Series	The Simpsons	Nominated
2007	Choice Animated Series	The Simpsons	Won
2007	Choice Summer Movie - Comedy/Musical	The Simpsons Movie	Nominated
2008	Choice Animated Series	The Simpsons	Nominated
2009	Choice Animated Series	The Simpsons	Nominated
2011	Choice Animated Series	The Simpsons	Won
2012	Choice Animated Series	The Simpsons	Won
2013	Choice Animated Series	The Simpsons	Won
2014	Choice Animated Series	The Simpsons	Won
2015	Choice Animated Series	The Simpsons	Nominated
2016	Choice Animated Series	The Simpsons	Nominated
2018	Choice Animated Series	The Simpsons	Nominated

== Other awards ==
Year	Award	Nominated work	Result
1991	Kids' Choice Award for Favorite TV Show	The Simpsons	Won
1991	MTV Video Music Award for Best Visual Effects	"Do the Bartman"	Nominated
1993	Genesis Award for Best Television Comedy Series	The Simpsons	Won
1993	Saturn Award for Best Network Television Series	The Simpsons	Won
1994	Genesis Award for Best Television Prime Time Animated Series	The Simpsons for "Whacking Day"	Won
1994	Saturn Award for Best Network Television Series	The Simpsons	Nominated
1995	Genesis Award for Best Television Comedy Series	The Simpsons for "Bart Gets an Elephant"	Won
1995	Saturn Award for Best Network Television Series	The Simpsons	Nominated
1996	Saturn Award for Best Network Television Series	The Simpsons	Nominated
1996	Kids' Choice Award for Favorite Cartoon	The Simpsons	Nominated
1997	GLAAD Media Award for Outstanding TV - Individual Episode	The Simpsons for "Homer's Phobia"	Won
1997	Kids' Choice Award for Favorite Cartoon	The Simpsons	Nominated
1997	Saturn Award for Best Network Television Series	The Simpsons	Nominated
1997	Peabody Award	The Simpsons	Won
1998	Kids' Choice Award for Favorite Cartoon	The Simpsons	Nominated
1998	Saturn Award for Best Network Television Series	The Simpsons	Nominated
1999	British Academy Television Award for Best International Programme	The Simpsons	Nominated
1999	Kids' Choice Award for Favorite Cartoon	The Simpsons	Nominated
1999	Saturn Award for Best Genre Network Series	The Simpsons	Nominated
2000	British Comedy Award for Best International Comedy Show	The Simpsons	Won
2000	Kids' Choice Award for Favorite Cartoon	The Simpsons	Nominated
2000	Satellite Award for Best Television Series – Musical or Comedy	The Simpsons	Nominated
2001	American Comedy Award for Funniest Animated Series	The Simpsons	Won
2001	Kids' Choice Award for Favorite Cartoon	The Simpsons	Nominated
2002	British Comedy Award for Outstanding Contribution to Comedy	The Simpsons	Won
2002	Kids' Choice Award for Favorite Cartoon	The Simpsons	Won
2002	Reuben Award for Outstanding Cartoonist of the Year	Life in Hell	Won
2002	Young Artist Award for Best Family TV Comedy Series	The Simpsons	Nominated
2003	AFI Award for TV Program of the Year	The Simpsons	Won
2003	Kids' Choice Award for Favorite Cartoon	The Simpsons	Nominated
2004	British Comedy Award for Best International Comedy Show	The Simpsons	Won
2004	British Comedy Award for Outstanding Contribution to Comedy	The Simpsons	Won
2004	Australian Kids' Choice Award for Fave Video Game	The Simpsons	Won
2004	Kids' Choice Award for Favorite Cartoon	The Simpsons	Nominated
2004	Young Artist Award for Best Family TV Comedy Series	The Simpsons	Nominated
2004	Australian Kids' Choice Awards for Fave TV show	The Simpsons	Won
2005	British Comedy Award for Best International Comedy Show	The Simpsons	Won
2005	DVDX Award for Best Audio Commentary (New for DVD)	The Simpsons	Nominated
2005	Australian Kids' Choice Awards for Fave TV show	The Simpsons	Won
2005	Kids' Choice Award for Favorite Cartoon	The Simpsons	Nominated
2005	Saturn Award for Best Television DVD Release	The Simpsons	Nominated
2006	Australian Kids' Choice Awards for Fave TV show	The Simpsons	Won
2006	Kids' Choice Award for Favorite Cartoon	The Simpsons	Nominated
2006	Satellite Award for Best DVD Release of a TV Show	The Simpsons	Won
2007	British Comedy Award for Best International Comedy Show	The Simpsons	Nominated
2007	Australian Kids' Choice Awards for Fave Toon	The Simpsons	Nominated
2007	Genesis Award: Sid Caesar Comedy Award	The Simpsons	Won
2007	UK Kids' Choice Award for Best Cartoon	The Simpsons	Won
2007	Chicago Film Critics Association Award for Best Animated Film	The Simpsons Movie	Nominated
2007	British Comedy Award for Best Comedy Film	The Simpsons Movie	Won
2007	MTV Movie Awards for Best Summer Movie You Haven't Seen Yet	The Simpsons Movie	Nominated
2007	National Movie Award for Best Animation	The Simpsons Movie	Won
2007	UK Kids' Choice Award for Best Movie	The Simpsons Movie	Won
2007	Satellite Award for Best Animated or Mixed Media Feature	The Simpsons Movie	Nominated
2007	Kids' Choice Award for Favorite Cartoon	The Simpsons	Nominated
2007	Spike Video Game Award for Best Game Based on a Movie or TV Show	The Simpsons Game	Won
2008	Online Film Critics Society Award for Best Animated Film	The Simpsons Movie	Nominated
2008	Critics' Choice Movie Award for Best Animated Feature	The Simpsons Movie	Nominated
2008	Producers Guild of America Award for Best Animated Motion Picture	The Simpsons Movie	Nominated
2008	BAFTA Award for Best Animated Film	The Simpsons Movie	Nominated
2008	Saturn Award for Best Animated Film	The Simpsons Movie	Nominated
2008	Kids' Choice Award for Favorite Cartoon	The Simpsons	Nominated
2008	Kids' Choice Award for Favorite Animated Movie	The Simpsons Movie	Nominated
2008	Australian Kids' Choice Awards for Fave TV show	The Simpsons	Won
2008	Satellite Award for Best DVD Release of a TV Show	The Simpsons	Nominated
2008	Prism Award for Comedy Series Episode	The Simpsons for "Crook and Ladder"	Won
2009	Genesis Award: Sid Caesar Comedy Award	The Simpsons	Won
2009	Australian Kids' Choice Awards for Fave TV show	The Simpsons	Won
2009	Kids' Choice Award for Favorite Cartoon	The Simpsons	Nominated
2009	Prism for Best Comedy Episode	The Simpsons for "Smoke on the Daughter"	Nominated
2010	Kids' Choice Award for Favorite Cartoon	The Simpsons	Nominated
2010	Prism for Best Comedy Episode	The Simpsons for "The Good, the Sad and the Drugly"	Nominated
2011	The Comedy Award for Animated Comedy Series	The Simpsons	Nominated
2011	The Comedy Award for Comedy Writing	The Simpsons	Nominated
2012	The Comedy Award for Animated Comedy Series	The Simpsons	Nominated
2012	Comic Con Icon Award		Won
2012	Hollywood Walk of Fame		Won
2013	Animation Writers Caucus Animation Writing Award		Won
2013	Critics' Choice Television Award for Best Animated Series	The Simpsons	Nominated
2014	Critics' Choice Television Award for Best Animated Series	The Simpsons	Nominated
2015	Critics' Choice Television Award for Best Animated Series	The Simpsons	Nominated
2016	Critics' Choice Television Award for Best Animated Series	The Simpsons	Nominated
2016	Prism for Best Comedy Episode	The Simpsons for "Puffless"	Nominated
2017	Saturn Award for Best Animated Series or Film on Television	The Simpsons	Nominated
2018	Critics' Choice Television Award for Best Animated Series	The Simpsons	Nominated
2018	Kids' Choice Award for Favorite Cartoon	The Simpsons	Nominated
2018	Saturn Award for Best Animated Series or Film on Television	The Simpsons	Nominated
2019	Critics' Choice Television Award for Best Animated Series	The Simpsons	Nominated
2019	Saturn Award for Best Animated Series or Film on Television	The Simpsons	Nominated
2020	Critics' Choice Television Award for Best Animated Series	The Simpsons	Nominated
2020	Kids' Choice Award for Favorite Cartoon	The Simpsons	Nominated
2020	Peabody Award	The Simpsons	Won
2023	Dorian Award for Best Animated Show	The Simpsons	Nominated
2023	Astra Award for Best Broadcast Network or Cable Animated Series	The Simpsons	Nominated
2024	Kids' Choice Award for Favorite Cartoon	The Simpsons	Nominated
2024	Astra Award for Best Animated Series or TV Movie	The Simpsons	Nominated
2025	Critics' Choice Television Award for Best Animated Series	The Simpsons	Nominated
2025	Kids' Choice Award for Favorite Cartoon	The Simpsons	Nominated
2025	Dorian Award for Best Animated Show	The Simpsons	Nominated
2025	Astra Award for Best Animated Series	The Simpsons	Nominated
