= Mr. Lisa Goes to Washington =

- The Simpsons episode
- Episode no.: Season 3 Episode 2
- Directed by: Wes Archer
- Written by: George Meyer
- Production code: 8F01
- Original air date: September 26, 1991

Episode features
- Chalkboard gag: "Spitwads are not free speech"
- Couch gag: The family sits down and Homer pulls Santa's Little Helper from under him.
- Commentary: Matt Groening; Al Jean; Mike Reiss; Julie Kavner; Wes Archer; David Silverman

Episode chronology
← Previous "Stark Raving Dad"	Next → "When Flanders Failed"
- The Simpsons season 3

"Mr. Lisa Goes to Washington" is the second episode of the third season of the American animated television series The Simpsons. It originally aired on Fox in the United States on September 26, 1991. In the episode, Lisa wins a patriotic essay contest about the United States. She and her family attend the contest finals in Washington, D.C., where she is dismayed after watching a congressman accept a bribe. Lisa loses the contest when she pens a scathing screed condemning the government system, but the corrupt congressman is jailed and removed from office, restoring her faith in government.

The episode was written by George Meyer and directed by Wes Archer. It was the first episode for which Al Jean and Mike Reiss served as showrunners. It features multiple references to the 1939 film Mr. Smith Goes to Washington, including the scene in which Lisa appeals to Lincoln's statue at the Lincoln Memorial for advice. Other Washington landmarks referenced in the episode include the White House, the Watergate Hotel, the Jefferson Memorial, the Washington Monument, the National Air and Space Museum and the Kennedy Center for the Performing Arts.

The episode acquired a Nielsen rating of 12.9, and was the third highest-rated show on Fox the week it aired. It received mostly positive reviews from television critics, who praised the episode for its satire on American politics. The timber industry criticized the scene in which Lisa witnesses a timber industry lobbyist offering a bribe to the congressman to allow loggers to raze the Springfield Forest. The scene was described as "an easy shot at hard-working people whose only crime is to have been born in a timber town".

== Plot ==
Homer sees an ad for a children's essay contest in the Reading Digest magazine. Lisa submits an essay on the contest's topic – "what makes America great" – after visiting Springfield Forest and seeing a bald eagle land nearby. The Simpsons travel to Washington, D.C. after Lisa's essay, "The Roots of Democracy", earns her a spot in the national finals there.

While Bart and Homer enjoy the all-expenses-paid perks of their trip, Lisa visits famous monuments for inspiration. At a shrine to a feminist icon, she sees a corrupt congressman, Bob Arnold, taking a bribe from a timber industry lobbyist to allow loggers to clearcut Springfield Forest. Heartbroken and disillusioned by government corruption, Lisa destroys her winning essay. She pens a scathing indictment, "Cesspool on the Potomac", which condemns government greed and corruption and names the politician involved in the bribery.

Lisa's essay elicits a hostile reaction from the judges and the audience. When word of her speech quickly spreads through the capital, Congressman Arnold is arrested, removed from office and sent to prison, where he becomes a born-again Christian. Lisa's essay fails to win the contest, but her faith in government is restored and the contest winner commends her courage and honesty.

== Production ==
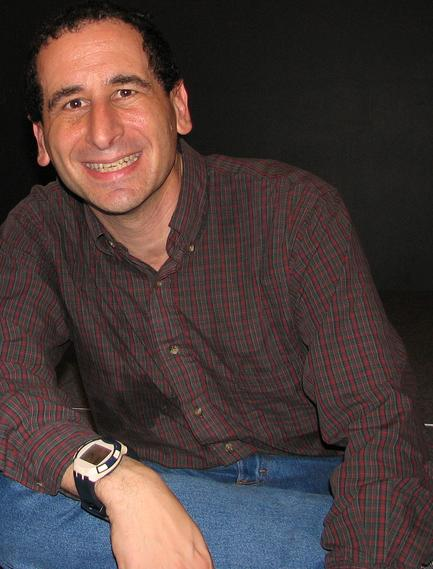
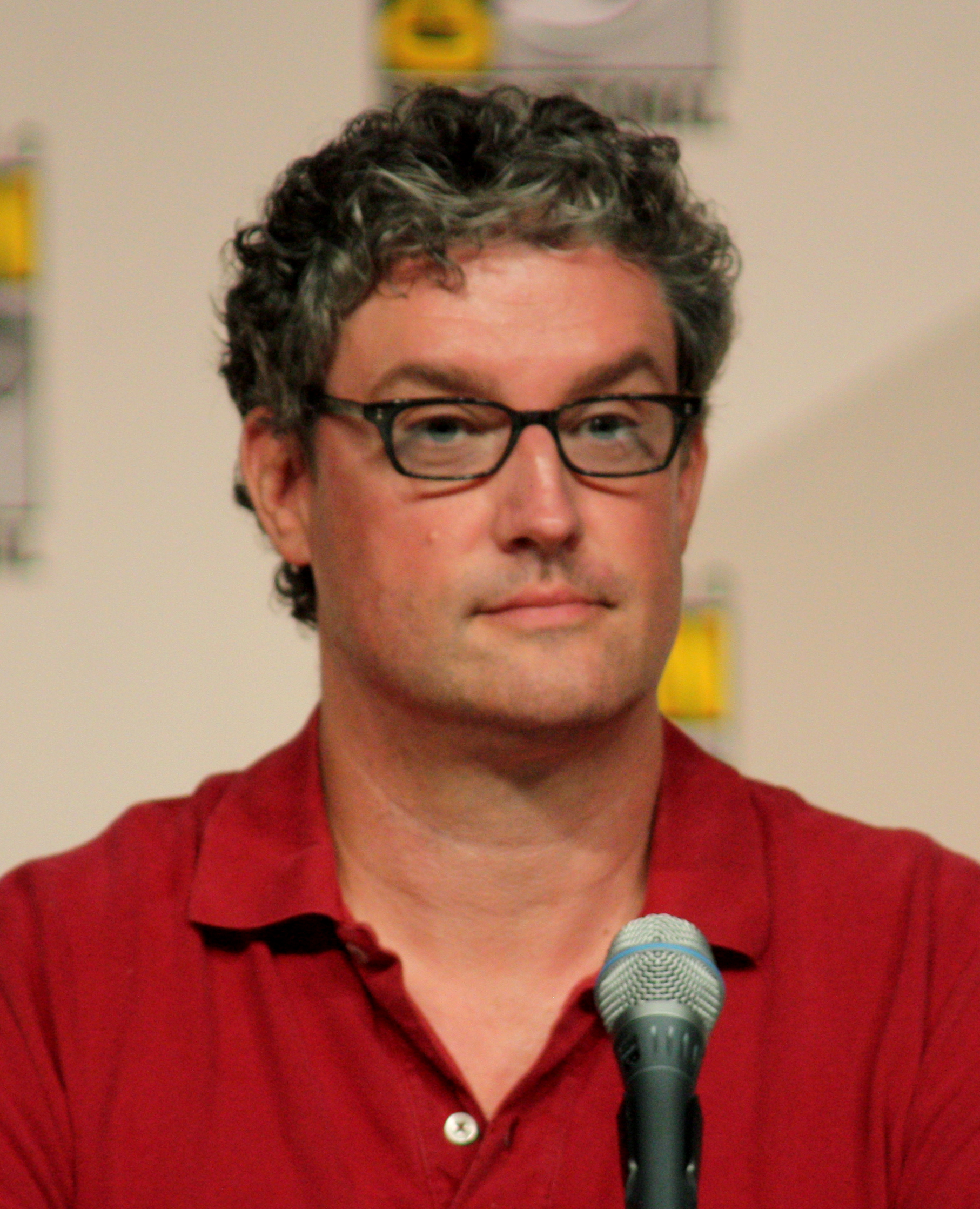
Mike Reiss (left) and Al Jean (right) took over as showrunners for the third season.

The episode was written by George Meyer. It is one of The Simpsons creator Matt Groening's favorite episodes of the earlier seasons because he thought it took the show to another level. Meyer said he has a "deep suspicion of social institutions and tradition in general," which affected the way he wrote the episode. Al Jean and Mike Reiss, who had written for The Simpsons since the start of the show, took over as show runners for the third season. Their first episode as show runners was "Mr. Lisa Goes to Washington" and they felt a lot of pressure about running the show. Jean and Reiss were so pressured that they did six to seven rewrites of the script to make it funnier. Jean said "one reason for doing all these rewrites is because I kept thinking 'It's not good enough. It's not good enough'," and Reiss added that "we were definitely scared. We had never run anything before, and they dumped us on this."

Wes Archer directed "Mr. Lisa Goes to Washington", which was one of the first episodes to feature the Simpson family traveling to a real-life location. Because much of the episode takes place outside of Springfield, new background and character designs had to be animated. The Simpson family visits several real-life landmarks in Washington, which the animators were able to draw with the help of photographs from the animation studio's library. The Simpsons director David Silverman grew up in the Washington area so he was able to help out with the designs. Marge's voice actor, Julie Kavner, said she loved the charm of the family "just being on a trip and experiencing the hotel room they're staying at, and the integrity of Bart's character. You know, you just want to kill him for doing all those tricks and pranks." Jean believes this is one of the secrets of the show's success, the fact that it is about a family and the writers can use experiences from their own or their family's life as an inspiration in their writing. He thought "Mr. Lisa Goes to Washington" was a perfectly constructed episode in that sense. This episode also featured the debut of George H. W. Bush (the then-incumbent U.S. president), voiced by Harry Shearer, who would reappear as a recurring character throughout the years, most notably in the season 7 episode "Two Bad Neighbors".

== Cultural references ==
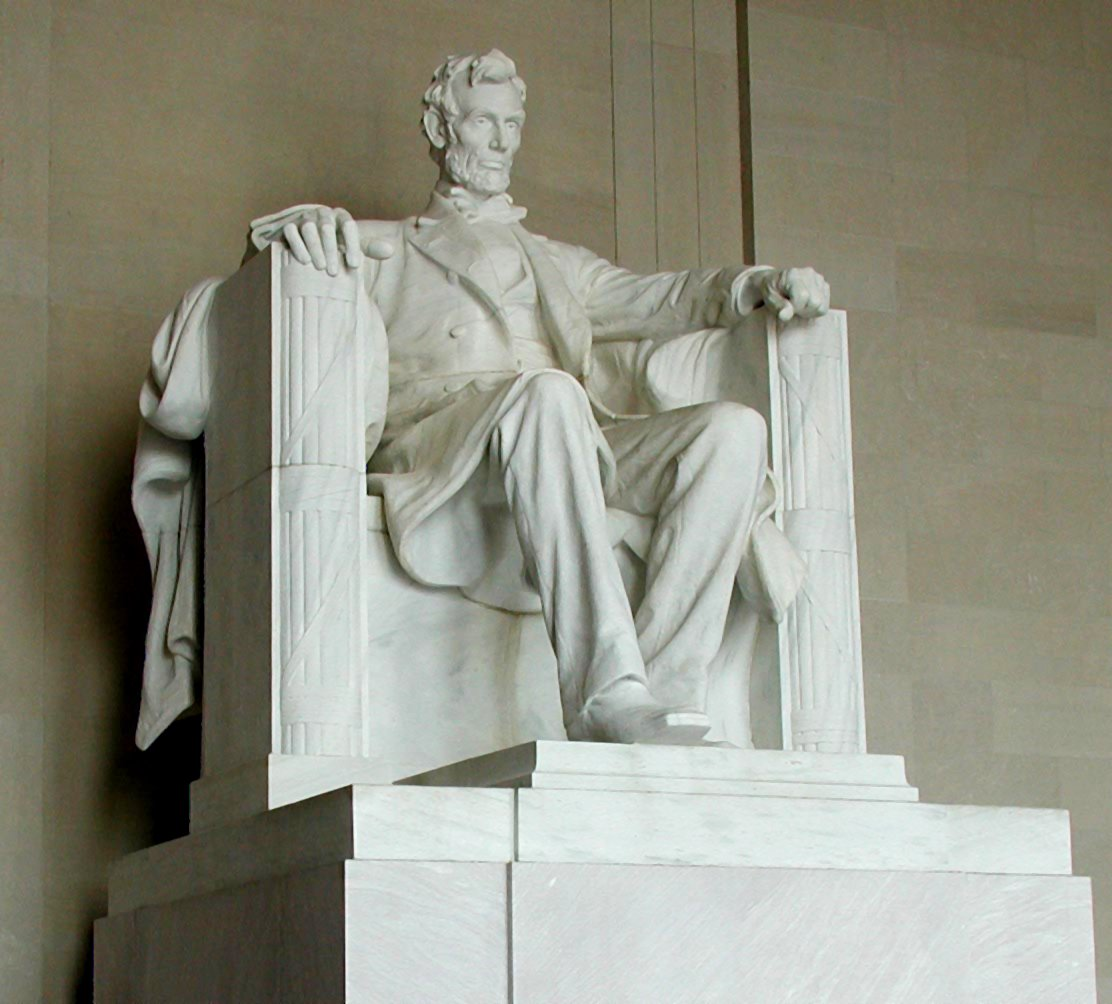
Lisa seeks advice from the Abraham Lincoln statue at the Lincoln Memorial.

The title and plot of the episode are parodies of the 1939 film Mr. Smith Goes to Washington, in which the character Jefferson Smith (James Stewart) comes to Washington with patriotic enthusiasm, but is instead shocked to see evidence of corruption in the government. The Tampa Tribune's Curtis Ross called this reference one of the best film references in The Simpsons' history. Lisa's visit to the Lincoln Memorial is a direct reference to Mr. Smith Goes to Washington, in which Smith appeals to Lincoln's statue for inspiration like Lisa did in the episode. In his book Abraham Lincoln in the Post-Heroic Era, Barry Schwartz writes that the scene with Lisa at the crowded monument shows how "thoroughly Lincoln's moral and emotional significance has waned". Mark Reinhart writes in the book Abraham Lincoln on Screen that the scene sums up "with brilliant wit" the American society's "annoying and ultimately useless tendency to ask [themselves] 'What would Lincoln have done?' whenever [they] face a political or social dilemma". Mr. Smith Goes to Washington was once again referenced on The Simpsons in the season fourteen episode "Mr. Spritz Goes to Washington".

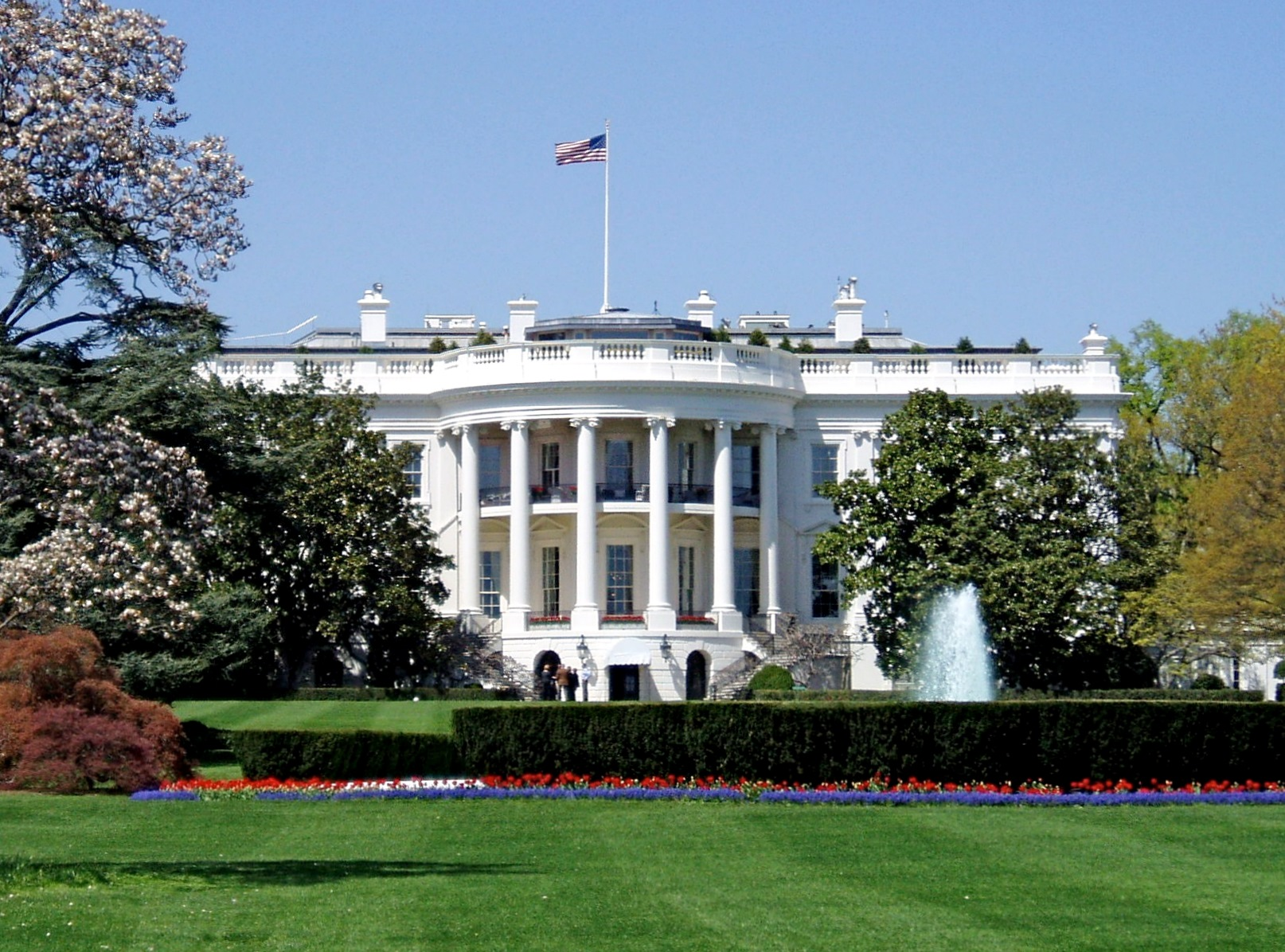
The family visit the White House, where they meet then First Lady Barbara Bush.

In addition to the Lincoln Memorial, other Washington, D.C. landmarks visited include the Jefferson Memorial, the Watergate Hotel (where the family stays), the Kennedy Center for the Performing Arts, the White House, the National Air and Space Museum, and the Washington Monument. When the family visits the White House, they encounter then-First Lady Barbara Bush in the bathtub of one of the many bathrooms. Another American landmark mentioned in the episode is Mount Rushmore. In addition, Lisa proposes that the family attend the memorial of the fictional Winifred Beecher Howe, an early crusader for women's rights who later appeared on the unpopular 75-cent coins, according to Lisa. This is a reference to the Susan B. Anthony dollar, which was minted for only three years and never became popular.

The episode makes references to several real-life persons. The piano-playing satirist who annoys Bart is a reference to Mark Russell and Tom Lehrer. Bob Arnold, the corrupt congressman, tells Lisa that there are quite a few women senators, but Lisa asserts that there are only two. (At the time, there were indeed only two, Nancy Landon Kassebaum of Kansas and Barbara Mikulski of Maryland.) Then-President George H. W. Bush is featured briefly in the episode. Shortly after it aired, Bush disparaged The Simpsons in a speech during his re-election campaign on January 27, 1992. At that point, family values were the cornerstone of Bush's campaign platform, so he gave the following speech at the National Religious Broadcasters' convention in Washington: "We are going to keep on trying to strengthen the American family, to make American families a lot more like the Waltons and a lot less like the Simpsons." As a result, Bush appeared in future episodes in a more negative light.

== Themes and analysis ==
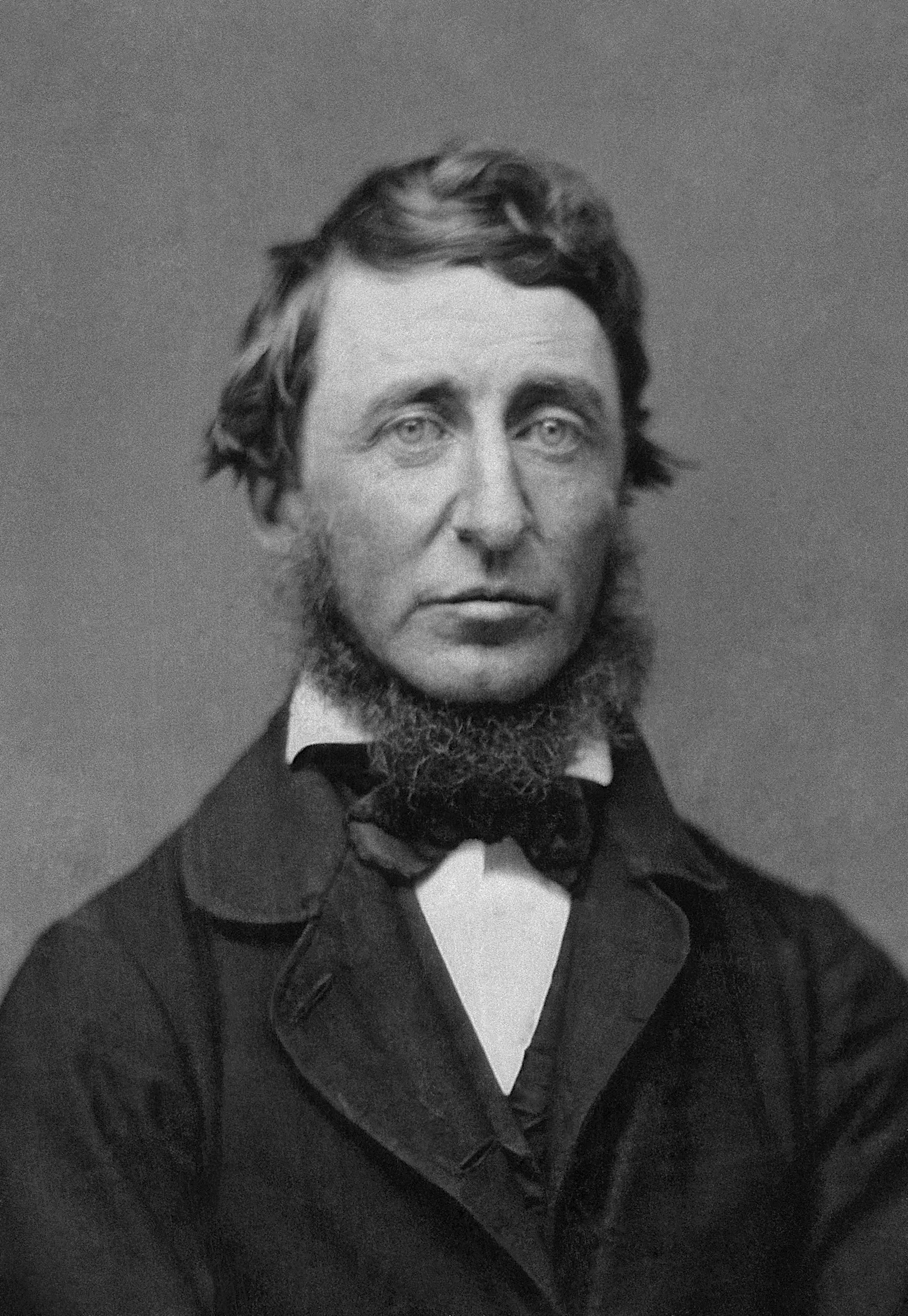
Lisa's role in the episode has been compared to Henry David Thoreau.

"Mr. Lisa Goes to Washington" has been labeled as a satire on American politics. Michael Bitzer, in an edited book by Joseph Foy and Stanley Schultz entitled Homer Simpson Goes to Washington, said this episode "espouses the virtues, vices, and varieties of American political culture, public opinion, and ultimately the American Dream". Bitzer also wrote that The Simpsons, through "skillful" use of satire, demonstrates with this episode "insights into the underlying political culture and public opinion of the United States' governing system (and, more broadly, society at large)". In his book Gilligan Unbound: Pop Culture in the Age of Globalization, Paul Arthur Cantor said he was amazed by how far the episode was "willing to take its corrosive satire of national politics". He said it "attacks the federal government at its foundation, the patriotic myths upon which its legitimacy lies. It makes fun of the very process by which patriotism is inculcated in the nation's youth, the hokey contests that lead children to outdo each other in progovernment effusions." When the corrupt congressman is arrested, Lisa proclaims "The system works!" Benedict Anderson wrote in the book The Spectre of Comparisons that series creator Matt Groening "assumes that his tickled audience is confident that the system barely works [...] So why does he need to show a patriot at all, especially one who is a deluded little female block-head? Probably because he, too, wishes to be seen as giving America another chance. Mr. Lisa guarantees his good intentions."

Günter Beck, a lecturer for the German Academic Exchange Service (DAAD) at the Haifa Center for German and European Studies at the University of Haifa in Israel, compared Lisa's role in the episode to the nineteenth-century American poet and philosopher Henry David Thoreau. He writes that Lisa stands up against the public's indifference towards the political system that Thoreau criticized, and comments that the emphasis should be "on the brave moral decision to stand up for principles and against the broad public. By this courageous act, 'to do what is right', an individual could save the well-being of the whole community. And indeed, Lisa's bravery is the impulse for the state's representatives to carry out their democratic obligations, so she can gladly notice 'The system works!' — her trust in democracy and its institutions is restored. Thoreau on the other hand, had no lasting trust in the system but only in the people themselves and in the individual's capacity to realize development and democracy."

== Reception ==
=== Broadcast and rereleases ===
"Mr. Lisa Goes to Washington" originally aired on the Fox network in the United States on September 26, 1991. The episode finished 36th in the ratings for the week of September 23–29, 1991, with a Nielsen rating of 12.9, equivalent to approximately 11.9 million viewing households. The Simpsons was the third highest-rated show on Fox that week, following Married... with Children and In Living Color. "Mr. Lisa Goes to Washington" and the episode "When Flanders Failed" were released on videocassette in 1999, entitled The Best of the Simpsons. The episode was later included on the Simpsons season three DVD set that was released on August 26, 2003. Wes Archer, David Silverman, Matt Groening, Al Jean, Mike Reiss, and Julie Kavner participated in the DVD's audio commentary of the episode.

=== Critical reviews ===
Since airing, the episode has received mostly positive reviews from television critics. The authors of the book I Can't Believe It's a Bigger and Better Updated Unofficial Simpsons Guide, Gary Russell and Gareth Roberts, praised the episode for being one of the best Lisa-centric episodes, and called Lisa's talk with Thomas Jefferson and her nightmare vision of politicians as pigs "especially worthy of note". Nate Meyers of Digitally Obsessed gave the episode a 4.5 rating and said it is one of the best episodes featuring Lisa, "complete with poignant observations about politics". He particularly enjoyed the appearance of Barbara Bush at the White House.

The Austin American-Statesman's Steven Stein said this was the first episode of The Simpsons he saw. Even though he did not understand half the pop culture references, by the end of the episode he was a "Simpsons convert". He thought there was "something exotic about an issue as serious as political corruption being dealt with in a cartoon and being interrupted by jokes about beer and, yes, doughnuts". The episode was praised for its political satire. Bill Gibron of DVD Verdict called the episode a "biting political satire in the guise of a children's oratory contest [which] signifies that this season of the series will be all over the map, both emotionally and logically". Gibron added: "Everything, from the Reader's Digest rants to the formulaic speeches of the youths, has a resounding ring of truth. And once the story moves to Washington D.C, our nation's capital is in for a royal reaming as well."

Bryce Wilson of Cinema Blend said the episode solidified the series' politically satirical voice as it "bitch slapped the Bush administration" that would later badmouth The Simpsons. DVD Movie Guide's Colin Jacobson, however, gave the episode a more negative review, stating that it "has its moments but never seems like one of the series' better programs. Part of that stems from its somewhat icky ending. The show exhibits a tone that feels more appropriate to a less biting and cynical series. It starts well with Homer's obsession with Reading Digest. After that, the show seems more erratic, and it remains pretty average overall."

Nathan Rabin writes that "It’s a testament to the respect The Simpsons has for its audience’s intelligence and frame of reference that it includes dead-on parodies of Reader’s Digest and Mark Russell in the same episode...Like James Stewart in Mr. Smith Goes to Washington, Lisa learns that Washington, D.C., is a lovely town with a rich, honorable history that’s also a seething cesspool of corruption after stumbling upon rank corruption in her midst. Like Capra, 'Mr. Lisa Goes to Washington' is able to ultimately play it both ways: It’s cynical and sincere, idealistic and jaded, filled with affection for our country’s virtues and constitution but filled with contempt for flag-waving, jingoism and empty bromides about our nation’s glory... 'Mr. Lisa Goes to Washington' ultimately delivers a viciously sarcastic happy ending. In order for the system to work, everyone becomes a saint. A Senator stops what he’s doing to deal with a matter of utmost urgency, a little girl losing her faith in the American system... It’s a happy ending in air quotes, a tribute to the American can-do spirit so ridiculously over-the-top that it’s impossible to take seriously. The show can’t deliver a happy ending without sneering just a little bit."

=== Response from the timber industry ===
According to The Plain Dealer's Rodney Ferguson, the timber industry was insulted by the scene in which a timber industry lobbyist offers a bribe to the corrupt congressman so that he can demolish Springfield Forest. The Oregon Lands Coalition, a pro-timber group in Salem, Oregon, "bombarded" the producers of the show with phone calls and mail protesting the episode. The coalition said it portrayed loggers unfairly and is "allowing itself to be used by environmental extremists". In an open letter to The Simpsons executive producer James L. Brooks, the coalition wrote: "Rather than approach this issue with genuine concern for Mother Earth, you took an easy shot at hard-working people whose only crime is [having been] born in a timber town." Karen Clark, a payroll clerk for a timber company in Stayton, Oregon, said: "The Simpsons portrayed us as greedy, bribery-type people. It didn't portray us as the everyday people—mothers, fathers, good members of society—that we are." Luke Popovich, vice president of the American Forest Council, wrote a letter to the show's producer to protest "the fuzzy-headed characterizations that pass for political correctness, the thinking in Hollywood where people are not very serious about these issues, but interested in pushing the right hot buttons, scoring the right points with audiences".

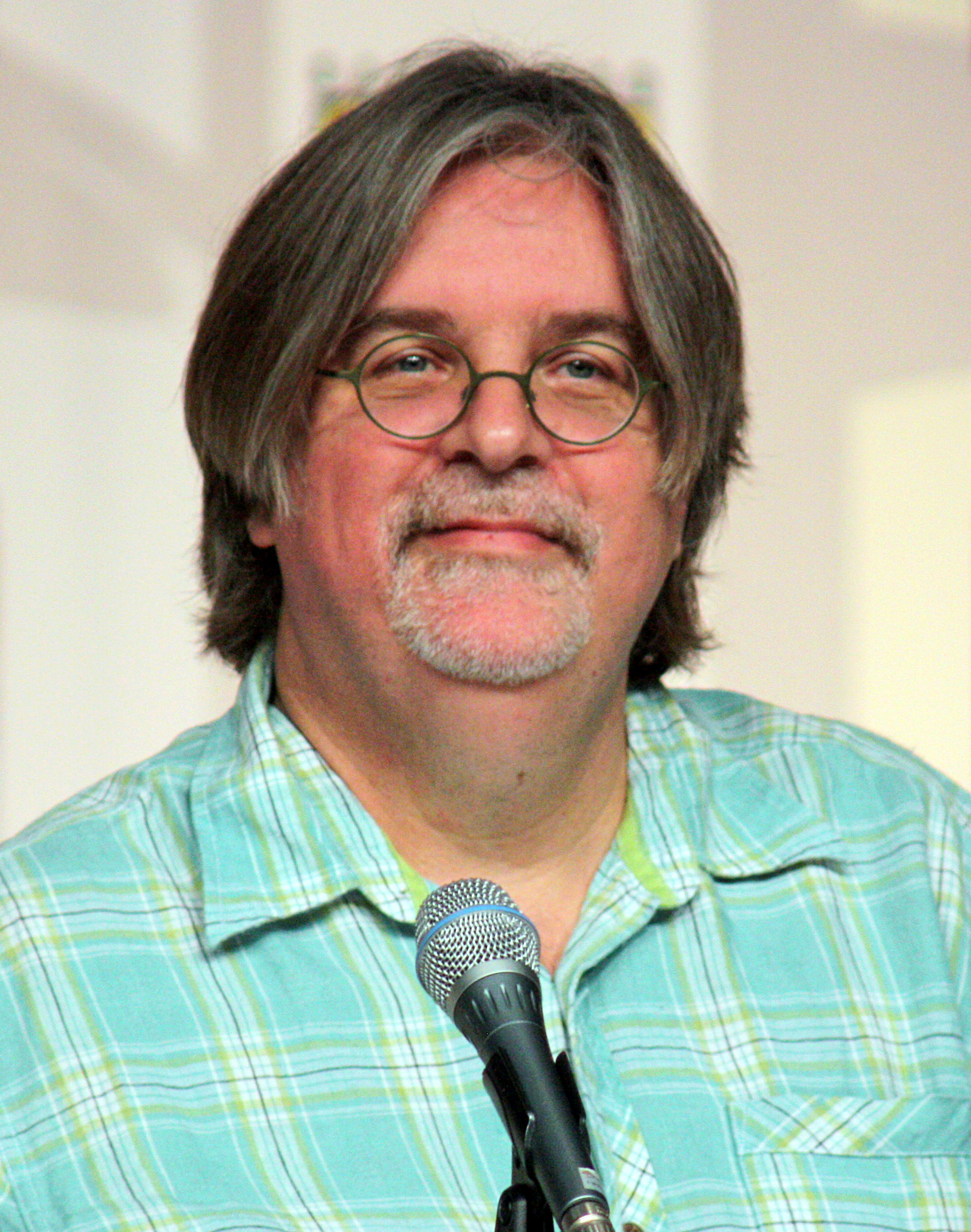
Matt Groening, creator of The Simpsons, responded to the criticism of the episode.

The Simpsons creator Matt Groening responded to the criticism in an interview with TV Guide, in which he said he did "research on the ecological damage caused by clear-cutting and over-logging [and] it's really appalling". Jackie Lang, a timber industry activist in Salem who helped lead the protest against the Fox network and Groening, said she was appalled by Groening's response, and "He will be sorry he ever made it." Jake Hogan, supervising producer of the show, defended Groening: "[The episodes] are just little stories, little comedies—stories that make people laugh." On October 15, 1991, Groening issued another statement to the public, in which he said: "So now a few lumber companies have joined the nuclear power industry, right-wing preachers and high-ranking Republicans in attacking The Simpsons. We must be doing something right. I must point out The Simpsons is a cartoon show—not 60 Minutes. Later in the show, the same lobbyist proposed drilling for oil in Teddy Roosevelt's head at Mount Rushmore. Please don't tell the oil companies about this."

David Reinhard of The Oregonian commented on the criticism: "Hollywood sharpsters can always make a group from the great American hinterland look ridiculous when it zeroes in on one show, particularly if that show is a cartoon. And the Oregon Lands Coalition's protest was a bit of an overreaction. But the environmental sloganeering of The Simpsons as well as Groening's cartoon commentary are symptomatic of a Hollywood and a popular culture that are hostile to the concerns and values of most Americans." After the episode aired, media researchers Robert Lichter and Linda S. Lichter found in a study of prime-time television that when shows dealt with business themes, 89 percent portrayed businessmen as swindlers or liars.

The same day Groening released his second statement, The Simpsons publicist Antonia Coffman was invited by Wayne Giesy, sales manager of Hull-Oakes Lumber Co. in Bellfountain, Oregon, to visit Oregon and see "responsible timber management". Giesy said they wanted to show the producers "how we log, how we manufacture, what goods we produce for everyone and how we replant for future generations. What most timber companies are interested in is a balanced program."
