= Homer Groening =

Canadian and American filmmaker (1919–1996)

- Groening in 1973
- Born: Homer Philip Groening; December 30, 1919; Main Centre, Saskatchewan, Canada
- Died: March 15, 1996 (aged 76); Portland, Oregon, U.S.
- Education: Linfield College (BA)
- Occupations: Director; producer; writer; advertiser; cartoonist
- Years active: 1958–1996
- Spouse: Marge Wiggum (m. 1941)
- Children: 5, including Matt
- Military career
- Allegiance: United States
- Branch: United States Army Air Forces
- Service years: 1942–1945
- Conflicts: World War II

Homer Philip Groening (December 30, 1919 – March 15, 1996) was a Canadian-American filmmaker, advertiser, writer, and cartoonist. He was the father of Matt Groening and inspired the name of Homer Simpson. Groening was known for work on many different types of short films.

== Biography ==
Groening was born in Main Centre, Saskatchewan, Canada, to a Mennonite family; he was named after the Greek poet Homer. The family would later move to Oregon. Groening attended Linfield College in Portland. After graduating in 1941, he married Marge Groening (née Wiggum). He served as a pilot in World War II, flying a B-17 Bomber.

Groening's career began in 1958 when he produced an advertisement for a local station KGW-TV. Groening also worked on many documentaries and films including The Big Three, Timberline, A Study in Wet, Man and His World Psychedelic Wet, the Story and Linfield Revisited. Groening also was a cartoonist. On April 28, 1962, the New Yorker ran an advertisement written by Groening. Groening also worked on several comic strips.

== Family and personal life ==
Groening was the father of Matt Groening, the creator of The Simpsons, Lisa Groening, who was married to Craig Bartlett, the creator of Hey Arnold!, as well as Maggie, Mark, and Patty Groening. Groening died on March 15, 1996, of cancer. Following his death, his wife Marge lived another 17 years and died on April 22, 2013. She was 94 years old.

Matt Groening has said that his father was nothing like Homer Simpson (despite the same name), describing him as a heroic World War II pilot, filmmaker and "a huge inspiration to me."

== Trivia ==
Homer Groening's film A Study in Wet, would be used as the vanity card for Matt Groening's "The Curiosity Company".
