= Mark Russell =

American political satirist and comedian (1932–2023)

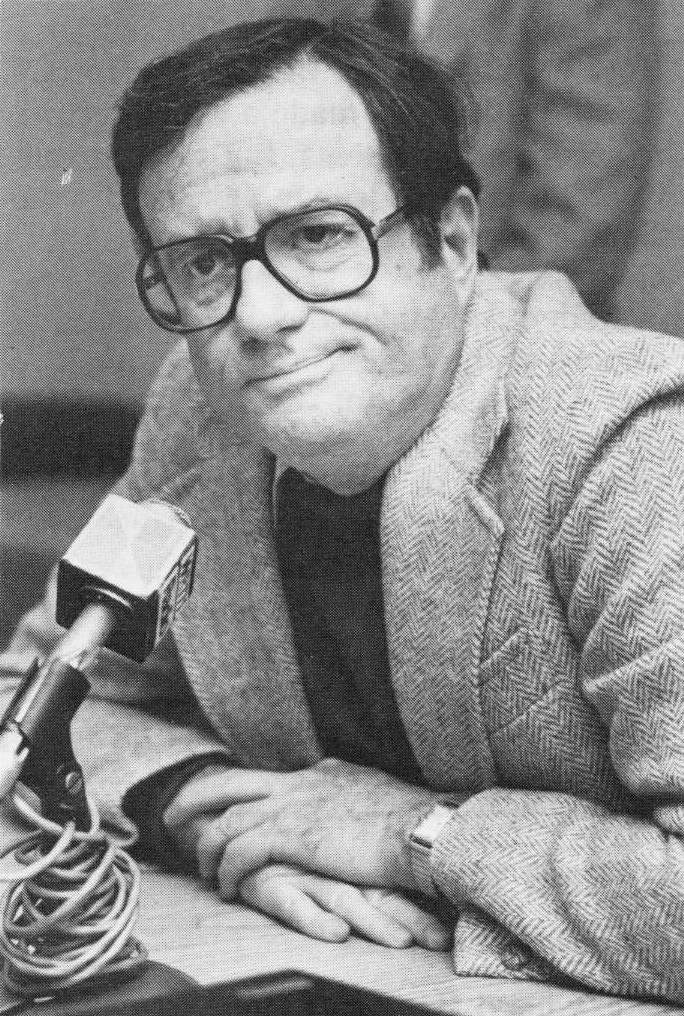
- Russell circa 1983
- Born: Marcus Joseph Ruslander; August 23, 1932; Buffalo, New York, U.S.
- Died: March 30, 2023 (aged 90); Washington, D.C., U.S.
- Children: 3

Comedy career
- Medium: Stand-up comedy, music
- Genres: Satire, parody
- Subjects: American politics, American culture, popular culture

Marcus Joseph Ruslander (August 23, 1932 – March 30, 2023), better known as Mark Russell, was an American political satirist and comedian. He is best known for his series of bimonthly comedy specials on PBS television between 1975 and 2004. His routines were a mix of political stand-up humor covering current events and musical parodies in which he accompanied himself on his trademark American flag-themed piano.

== Early life ==
Mark Russell was born Marcus Joseph Ruslander and grew up in Buffalo, New York, the son of Marie Elizabeth (Perry) and Martin Ruslander. He graduated from Canisius High School in Buffalo. After high school, his family briefly moved to Florida, then to Washington, D.C., where he enrolled at George Washington University, but stayed for only a month before joining the United States Marine Corps.

== Career ==
Beginning in the early 1960s, he was a regular entertainer at the Shoreham Hotel in Washington, D.C. and did his first PBS show in 1975. He was a regular on the 1977 CBS variety show The Starland Vocal Band Show. From 1979 to 1984, he was a correspondent on the NBC reality TV show Real People.

Russell's song parodies employed melodies from old standards with new humorous lyrics pertinent to the subject matter. For example, in 1990, following the execution of the Romanian dictator Nicolae Ceaușescu, Russell did a parody song on his show to the tune of "Chattanooga Choo-Choo". ("Pardon me, boys / Are you the cats who shot Ceauşescu? / You made my day / The way you blew him away.") Russell himself admitted that most of his jokes and songs are very topical and have "a shelf life shorter than cottage cheese".

Russell's humor was known for having skewered Democrats and Republicans, as well as third party and independent politicians and other prominent political (and sometimes nonpolitical) figures.

Russell was often asked the question "Do you have any writers?" His standard response was "Oh, yes. I have 535 writers: One hundred in the Senate and 435 in the House of Representatives!" When asked if his views on current events are too caustic, Russell replied, "I follow the old newsman's adage. As they say, 'I don't make the news. I just report it.' And in my case, I don't even make the jokes. I just report them as they masquerade as news."

For several years, on the Sunday before Labor Day, Russell made annual appearances on Meet the Press, which was hosted from 1991 to 2008 by Tim Russert, also a Canisius High graduate.

=== Parody issues ===
In 1994, Russell found himself unexpectedly allied with the rap group 2 Live Crew when the group was sued for copyright infringement for their parody of the song "Oh, Pretty Woman". The case went to the U.S. Supreme Court, where Russell and the members of 2 Live Crew argued that song parodies were protected under fair use. The Supreme Court agreed and ruled in favor of Russell and 2 Live Crew (Campbell v. Acuff-Rose Music, Inc.).

=== Retirement ===
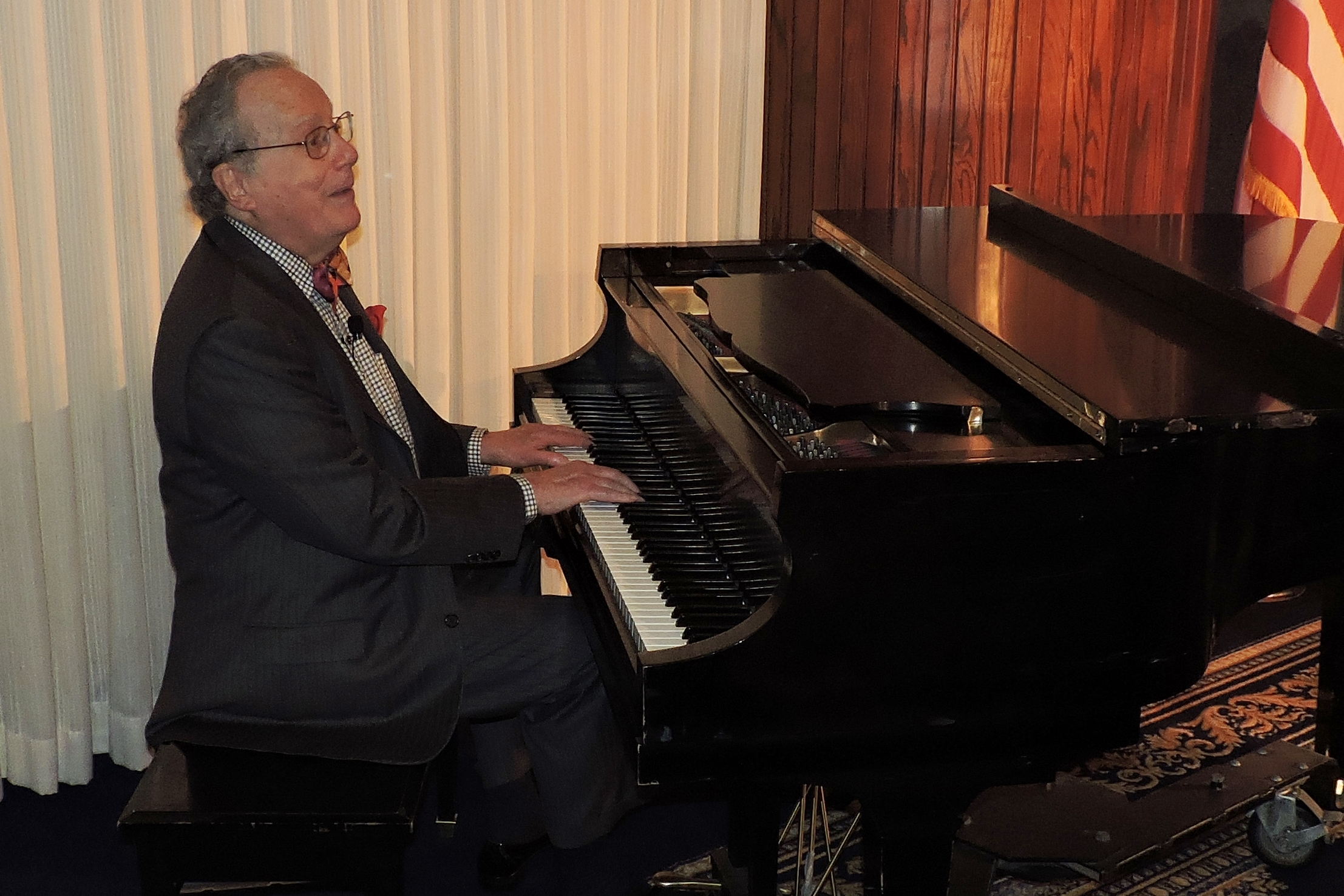
Russell at the piano in 2016

In 2010, Russell announced his retirement from public performances and made his last public performance in July 2010 in Chautauqua, New York. He continued to write political humor for various venues and also published jokes on his own website.

By 2013, Russell began to tour and perform publicly again. His final performance was October 30, 2016, at the Carolina Theatre in Greensboro, North Carolina.

== In popular media ==
Russell was portrayed by Mark McKinney in a 1996 episode of Saturday Night Live.

In the NewsRadio episode "The Public Domain" (1997), Phil Hartman's character Bill McNeal is inspired by Russell to start a career as a singing political comedian. Lyrics on the episode included "Twinkle, twinkle, Kenneth Starr. Whitewater special prosecu-tar."

In the earlier years of his run of PBS specials, an electronic version of "Yankee Doodle" was used in the opening sequence, which featured animated versions of an eagle, an elephant, and a donkey with Russell, dressed as Uncle Sam, being dragged by its tail marching across the screen. In later years, the opening sequence was a montage of a few of Russell's monologues accompanied by a Dixieland jazz arrangement of "The Stars and Stripes Forever". A similar arrangement of the song "Happy Days Are Here Again" was used for his entrance and as the closing theme.

Russell was referenced by Stan Smith's college government professor in the American Dad! episode "Stan Moves to Chicago". The professor said they despise comedy, except for Russell's piano routines.

Russell's musical act was parodied in The Simpsons episode "Mr. Lisa Goes to Washington".

== Death ==
Russell died of complications from prostate cancer on March 30, 2023, at his home in Washington, D.C., at the age of 90.

== Awards ==
On June 18, 1992 Mark Russell was the 4th recipient of The Lucy Award.

In 2004 Russell was the recipient of the Buffalo Broadcasters Hall of Fame Buffalo Bob Award, which is awarded annually to a Buffalo native who has achieved success in broadcasting outside of the Niagara Frontier area.

== See also ==
- Tom Lehrer
- Randy Rainbow
