= Main Centre, Saskatchewan =

Locality in Saskatchewan, Canada

Coordinates: 50°34′59″N 107°20′41″W

Main Centre is a hamlet in the Canadian province of Saskatchewan. Listed as a designated place by Statistics Canada, the hamlet had a reported population of 5 living in 3 of its 4 total private dwellings in the Canada 2011 Census.

It is notable for being the birthplace of Homer Groening, the father of The Simpsons creator Matt Groening.
