= Matt Groening =

American cartoonist (born 1954)

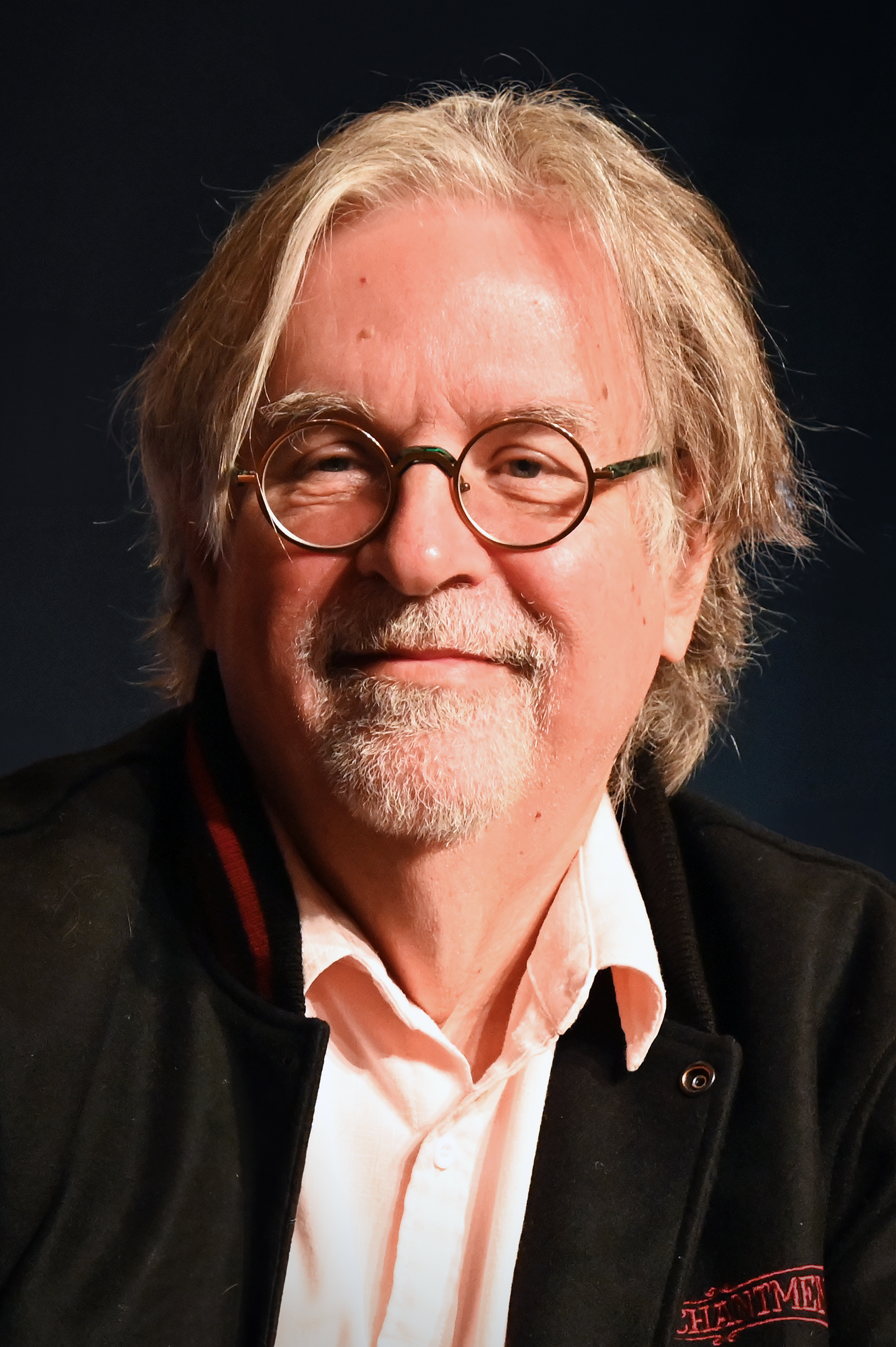
- Groening in 2024
- Born: Matthew Abram Groening; February 15, 1954 (age 72); Portland, Oregon, U.S.
- Education: Evergreen State College (BA)
- Occupations: Cartoonist; writer; producer; animator
- Years active: 1977–present
- Notable work: Life in Hell; The Simpsons; Futurama; Disenchantment
- Political party: Democratic
- Spouses: Deborah Caplan (m. 1986; div. 1999); Agustina Picasso (m. 2011)
- Children: 10
- Father: Homer Groening
- Relatives: Craig Bartlett (former brother-in-law)
- Awards: Full list

Matthew Abram "Matt" Groening (/ˈɡreɪnɪŋ/ GRAY-ning; born February 15, 1954) is an American cartoonist. He is the creator of the television series The Simpsons (1989–present), Futurama (1999–2003, 2008–2013, 2023–present), and Disenchantment (2018–2023), as well as the comic strip Life in Hell (1977–2012).

Born in Portland, Oregon, Groening made his first professional cartoon sale of Life in Hell to the avant-garde magazine Wet in 1978. At its peak, it was carried in 250 weekly newspapers and caught the attention of the producer James L. Brooks, who contacted Groening in 1985 about adapting it for animated sequences for the Fox variety show The Tracey Ullman Show. Fearing the loss of ownership rights, Groening created a new set of characters, the Simpson family. The shorts were spun off into their own series, The Simpsons, which became the longest-running American primetime television series and the longest-running American animated series and sitcom.

In 1997, Groening and former Simpsons writer David X. Cohen began production on Futurama, an animated series about life in the year 3000, which premiered in 1999. It ran for four years on Fox, was picked up in 2008 by Comedy Central for another 5 years, and was picked up again by Hulu in 2023. In 2016, Groening developed a series for Netflix, Disenchantment, which premiered in August 2018.

Groening has won 14 Primetime Emmy Awards, 12 for The Simpsons and 2 for Futurama, and a British Comedy Award for "outstanding contribution to comedy" in 2004. In 2002, he won the National Cartoonist Society Reuben Award for his work on the Life in Hell comics syndicated in over 250 daily and weekly newspapers. He received a star on the Hollywood Walk of Fame on February 14, 2012.

== Early life and education ==
Matthew Abram Groening was born in Portland, Oregon, on February 15, 1954, the middle of five children (older sister Patty and brother Mark were born in 1943 and 1950, and younger sisters Lisa and Maggie in 1956 and 1958, respectively). His Norwegian American mother, Margaret Ruth (née Wiggum; March 23, 1919 – April 22, 2013), was once a teacher, and his Canadian Mennonite father, Homer Philip Groening (December 30, 1919 – March 15, 1996), was a filmmaker, advertiser, writer and cartoonist. Homer, born in Main Centre, Saskatchewan, Canada, grew up in a Plautdietsch-speaking family.

Groening's grandfather, Abram A. Groening, was a professor at Tabor College, a Mennonite Brethren liberal arts college in Hillsboro, Kansas, before moving to Albany College (now known as Lewis and Clark College) in Oregon in 1930.

Groening was raised in Portland and attended Ainsworth Elementary School and Lincoln High School. Following his high school graduation in 1972, Groening attended The Evergreen State College in Olympia, Washington, a liberal arts school that he described as "a hippie college, with no grades or required classes, that drew every weirdo in the Northwest". He served as the editor of the campus newspaper, The Cooper Point Journal, for which he also wrote articles and drew cartoons. Groening almost graduated with a Bachelor of Arts in journalism in 1977. He left before completing his degree. He befriended fellow cartoonist Lynda Barry after discovering that she had written a fan letter to Joseph Heller, one of Groening's favorite authors, and had received a reply. Groening has credited Barry with being "probably [his] biggest inspiration". He first became interested in cartoons after watching the Disney animated film One Hundred and One Dalmatians as well as Monty Python.

== Career ==
=== Early career ===
In 1977, at age 23, Groening moved to Los Angeles to become a writer. He went through several jobs, including being an extra in the television film When Every Day Was the Fourth of July, busing tables, washing dishes at a nursing home, clerking at the Hollywood Licorice Pizza record store, landscaping in a sewage treatment plant, and chauffeuring and ghostwriting for a retired director of Western films.

=== Life in Hell ===
Cover of Life in Hell No. 4, published in 1978

Groening described life in Los Angeles to his friends in the form of the self-published comic book Life in Hell, which was loosely inspired by the chapter "How to Go to Hell" in Walter Kaufmann's book Critique of Religion and Philosophy. Groening distributed the comic book in the book corner of Licorice Pizza, a record store in which he worked. He made his first professional cartoon sale to the avant-garde Wet magazine in 1978. The strip, titled "Forbidden Words", appeared in the September/October issue of that year.

Groening had gained employment at the Los Angeles Reader, a newly formed alternative newspaper, delivering papers, typesetting, editing and answering phones. He showed his cartoons to the editor, James Vowell, who was impressed and eventually gave him a spot in the paper. Life in Hell made its official debut as a comic strip in the Reader on April 25, 1980. Vowell also gave Groening his own weekly music column, "Sound Mix", in 1982. However, the column would rarely actually be about music, as he would often write about his "various enthusiasms, obsessions, pet peeves and problems" instead. In an effort to add more music to the column, he "just made stuff up", concocting and reviewing fictional bands and nonexistent records. In the following week's column, he would confess to fabricating everything in the previous column and swear that everything in the new column was true. Eventually, he was finally asked to give up the "music" column. Among the fans of the column was Harry Shearer, (This is Spinal Tap) who would later become a voice actor on The Simpsons.

Life in Hell became popular almost immediately. In November 1984, Deborah Caplan, Groening's then-girlfriend and co-worker at the Reader, offered to publish "Love Is Hell", a series of relationship-themed Life in Hell strips, in book form. Released a month later, the book was an underground success, selling 22,000 copies in its first two printings. Work Is Hell soon followed, also published by Caplan. Soon afterward, Caplan and Groening left and put together the Life in Hell Cartoon Co., where Caplan endeavored to introduce his work to the world. Acme Features Syndicate, which initially syndicated Life in Hell as well as work by Lynda Barry and John Callahan, would eventually only syndicate Life in Hell. At the end of its run, Life in Hell was carried in 250 weekly newspapers and has been anthologized in a series of books, including School Is Hell, Childhood Is Hell, The Big Book of Hell, and The Huge Book of Hell. Although Groening had previously stated, "I'll never give up the comic strip. It's my foundation," the June 16, 2012, strip marked Life in Hell's conclusion. After Groening ended the strip, the Center for Cartoon Studies commissioned a poster that was presented to Groening in honor of his work. The poster contained tribute cartoons by 22 of Groening's cartoonist friends who were influenced by Life in Hell.

=== The Simpsons ===
==== Creation ====
The design of the Simpson family circa 1987

His partner, Deborah, was asked to bring a portfolio of Life in Hell original art to Fox Studios for fellow producer Polly Platt who wanted it as a gift for Hollywood writer-director-producer and Gracie Films founder James L. Brooks, The cartoon was entitled, "The Los Angeles Way of Death". In 1985, Brooks contacted Groening with the proposition of working in animation on an undefined future project, which would turn out to be developing a series of short animated skits, called "bumpers," for the Fox variety show The Tracey Ullman Show. Originally, Brooks wanted Groening to adapt his Life in Hell characters for the show. Groening feared that he would have to give up his ownership rights, and that the show would fail and take down his comic strip with it. Groening conceived of the idea for the Simpsons in the lobby of James L. Brooks's office and hurriedly sketched out his version of a dysfunctional family: Homer, the overweight father; Marge, the slim mother; Bart, the miscreant oldest child; Lisa, the intelligent middle child; and Maggie, the baby. Groening famously named the main Simpson characters after members of his own family: his parents, Homer and Marge (for Groening's mother it was short for Margaret and the cartoon character Marge is short for Marjorie), and his younger sisters, Lisa and Margaret (Maggie). Claiming that it was a bit too obvious to name a character after himself, he chose the name "Bart", an anagram of brat. However, he stresses that aside from some of the sibling rivalry, his family is nothing like the Simpsons, although his mother was purportedly the brunt of family jokes. Groening also has an older brother and sister, Mark and Patty, and in a 1995 interview Groening divulged that Mark "is the actual inspiration for Bart". Groening has said that his father was nothing like Homer (despite the same name), describing him as a heroic World War II pilot, filmmaker and "a huge inspiration to me".

Maggie Groening has co-written a few Simpsons books featuring her cartoon namesake.

==== The Tracey Ullman Show ====
The family was crudely drawn, because Groening had submitted basic sketches to the animators, assuming they would clean them up; instead, they just traced over his drawings. The entire Simpson family was designed so that they would be recognizable in silhouette. When Groening originally designed Homer, he put his own initials into the character's hairline and ear: the hairline resembled an 'M', and the right ear resembled a 'G'. Groening decided that this would be too distracting though, and redesigned the ear to look normal. He still draws the ear as a 'G' when he draws pictures of Homer for fans. Marge's distinct beehive hairstyle was inspired by Bride of Frankenstein and the style that Margaret Groening wore during the 1960s, although her hair was never blue. Bart's original design, which appeared in the first shorts, had spikier hair, and the spikes were of different lengths. The number was later limited to nine spikes, all of the same size. At the time Groening was primarily drawing in black and "not thinking that [Bart] would eventually be drawn in color" gave him spikes that appear to be an extension of his head. Lisa's physical features are generally not used in other characters; for example, in the later seasons, no character other than Maggie shares her hairline. While designing Lisa, Groening "couldn't be bothered to even think about girls' hair styles". When designing Lisa and Maggie, he "just gave them this kind of spiky starfish hair style, not thinking that they would eventually be drawn in color". Groening storyboarded and scripted every short (now known as The Simpsons shorts), which were then animated by a team including David Silverman and Wes Archer, both of whom would later become directors on the series.

The Simpsons shorts first appeared in The Tracey Ullman Show on April 19, 1987. Another family member, Grampa Simpson, was introduced in the later shorts. Years later, during the early seasons of The Simpsons, when it came time to give Grampa a first name, Groening says he refused to name him after his own grandfather, Abraham Groening, leaving it to other writers to choose a name. By coincidence, they chose "Abraham", unaware that it was the name of Groening's grandfather.

==== Series ====
Although The Tracey Ullman Show was not a big hit, the popularity of the shorts led to a half-hour spin-off in 1989. A team of production companies adapted The Simpsons into a half-hour series for the Fox Broadcasting Company. The team included what is now the Klasky-Csupo animation house. James L. Brooks negotiated a provision in the contract with the Fox network that prevented Fox from interfering with the show's content. Groening said his goal in creating the show was to offer the audience an alternative to what he called "the mainstream trash" that they were watching. The half-hour series premiered on December 17, 1989, with "Simpsons Roasting on an Open Fire", a Christmas special. "Some Enchanted Evening" was the first full-length episode produced, but it did not broadcast until May 1990, as the last episode of the first season, because of animation problems.

The series quickly became a worldwide phenomenon, to the surprise of many, however, the previous five years where Deborah promoted his cartoon, Life in Hell, produced a huge fan base that immediately became the television show's most ardent fans. Groening said: "Nobody thought The Simpsons was going to be a big hit. It sneaked up on everybody." The Simpsons was co-developed by Groening, Brooks, and Sam Simon, a writer-producer with whom Brooks had worked on previous projects. Groening and Simon, however, did not get along and were often in conflict over the show; Groening once described their relationship as "very contentious". Simon left the show in 1993 over creative differences.

Like the main family members, several characters from the show have names that were inspired by people, locations or films. The name "Wiggum" for police chief Chief Wiggum is Groening's mother's maiden name. The names of a few other characters were taken from street names in Groening's hometown of Portland, Oregon, including Flanders, Lovejoy, Powell, Quimby and Kearney. Despite common fan belief that Sideshow Bob Terwilliger was named after SW Terwilliger Boulevard in Portland, he was actually named after the character Dr. Terwilliker from the film The 5,000 Fingers of Dr. T..

Although Groening has pitched a number of spin-offs from The Simpsons, those attempts have been unsuccessful. In 1994, Groening and other Simpsons producers pitched a live-action spin-off about Krusty the Clown (with Dan Castellaneta playing the lead role), but were unsuccessful in getting it off the ground. Groening has also pitched "Young Homer" and a spin-off about the non-Simpsons citizens of Springfield.

In 1995, Groening got into a major disagreement with Brooks and other Simpsons producers over "A Star Is Burns", a crossover episode with The Critic, an animated show also produced by Brooks and staffed with many former Simpsons crew members. Groening claimed that he feared viewers would "see it as nothing but a pathetic attempt to advertise The Critic at the expense of The Simpsons," and was concerned about the possible implication that he had created or produced The Critic. He requested his name be taken off the episode.

Groening is credited with writing or co-writing the episodes "Some Enchanted Evening", "The Telltale Head", "Colonel Homer" and "22 Short Films About Springfield". He also co-wrote and produced The Simpsons Movie, released in 2007. He has had several cameo appearances in the show, with him having done a speaking role for his animated counterpart in the episode "My Big Fat Geek Wedding". He currently serves at The Simpsons as an executive producer and creative consultant.

=== Futurama ===
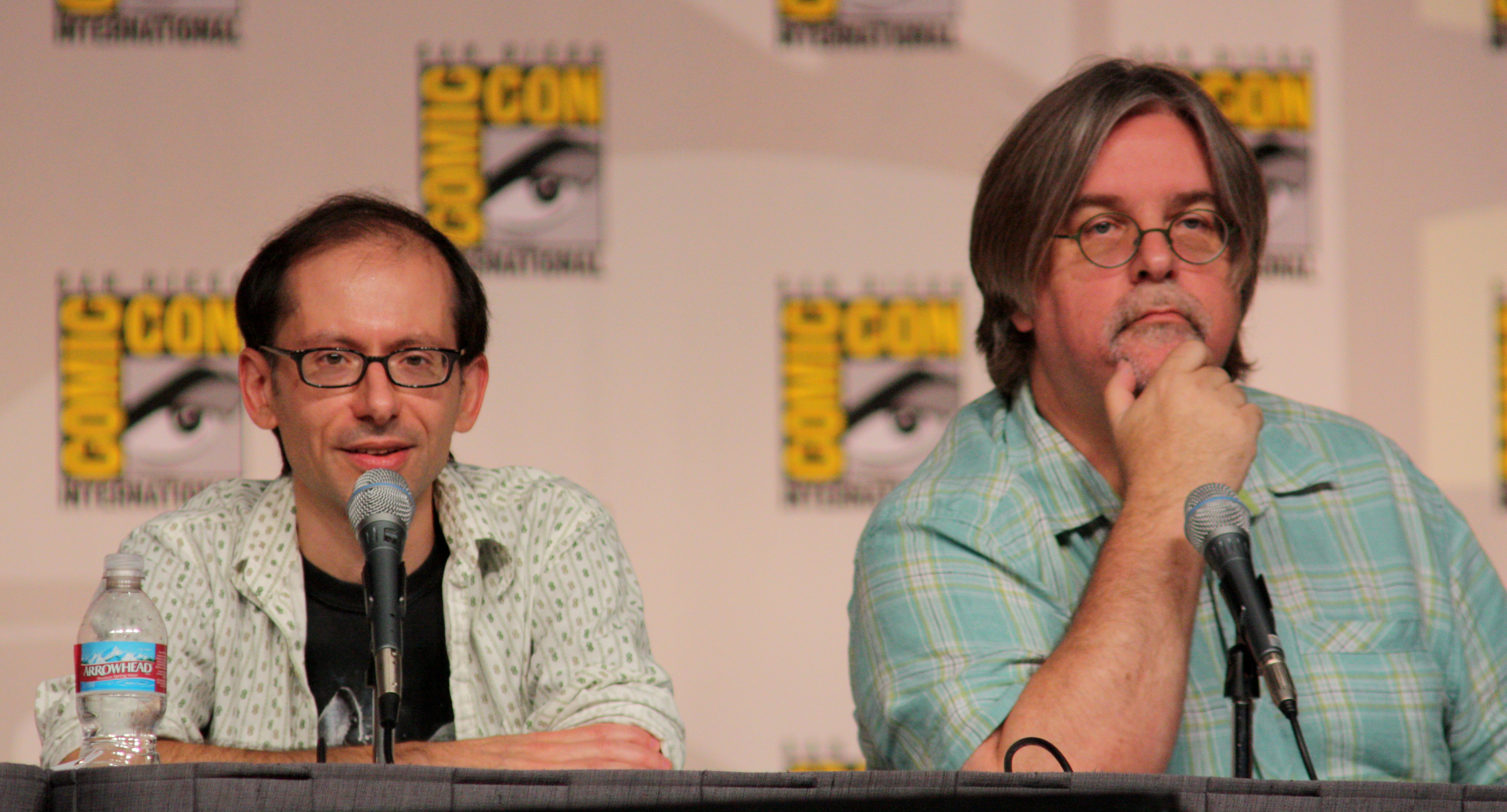
David X. Cohen and Groening at the Futurama panel of Comic-Con 2009

After spending a few years researching science fiction, Groening got together with Simpsons writer and producer David X. Cohen (known as David S. Cohen at the time) in 1997 and developed Futurama, an animated series about life in the year 3000. By the time they pitched the series to Fox in April 1998, Groening and Cohen had composed many characters and storylines; Groening claimed they had gone "overboard" in their discussions. Groening described trying to get the show on the air as "by far the worst experience of [his] grown-up life". The show premiered on March 28, 1999. Groening's writing credits for the show are for the premiere episode, "Space Pilot 3000" (co-written with Cohen), "Rebirth" (story) and "In-A-Gadda-Da-Leela" (story).

After four years on the air, the show was canceled by Fox. In a situation similar to Family Guy, however, strong DVD sales and very stable ratings on Adult Swim brought Futurama back to life. When Comedy Central began negotiating for the rights to air Futurama reruns, Fox suggested that there was a possibility of also creating new episodes. When Comedy Central committed to sixteen new episodes, it was decided that four straight-to-DVD films—Bender's Big Score (2007), The Beast with a Billion Backs (2008), Bender's Game (2008) and Into the Wild Green Yonder (2009)—would be produced.

Since no new Futurama projects were in production, the movie Into the Wild Green Yonder was designed to stand as the Futurama series finale. However, Groening had expressed a desire to continue the Futurama franchise in some form, including as a theatrical film. In an interview with CNN, Groening said that "we have a great relationship with Comedy Central and we would love to do more episodes for them, but I don't know... We're having discussions and there is some enthusiasm but I can't tell if it's just me". Comedy Central commissioned an additional 26 new episodes, and began airing them in 2010. The show continued in to 2013, before Comedy Central announced in April 2013 that they would not be renewing it beyond its seventh season. The final episode aired on September 4, 2013.

On February 9, 2022, the series was revived at Hulu, with the eighth season premiering on July 24, 2023.

=== Disenchantment ===
On January 15, 2016, it was announced that Groening was in talks with Netflix to develop a new animated series. On July 25, 2017, the series, Disenchantment, was ordered by Netflix. He described the fantasy-oriented series as originating in a sketchbook full of "fantastic creatures we couldn't do on The Simpsons". The cast includes Abbi Jacobson, Eric Andre, and Nat Faxon.

Disenchantment ran from August 17, 2018, to September 1, 2023, concluding with its fifth and final part, released on September 1, 2023.

=== Other pursuits ===
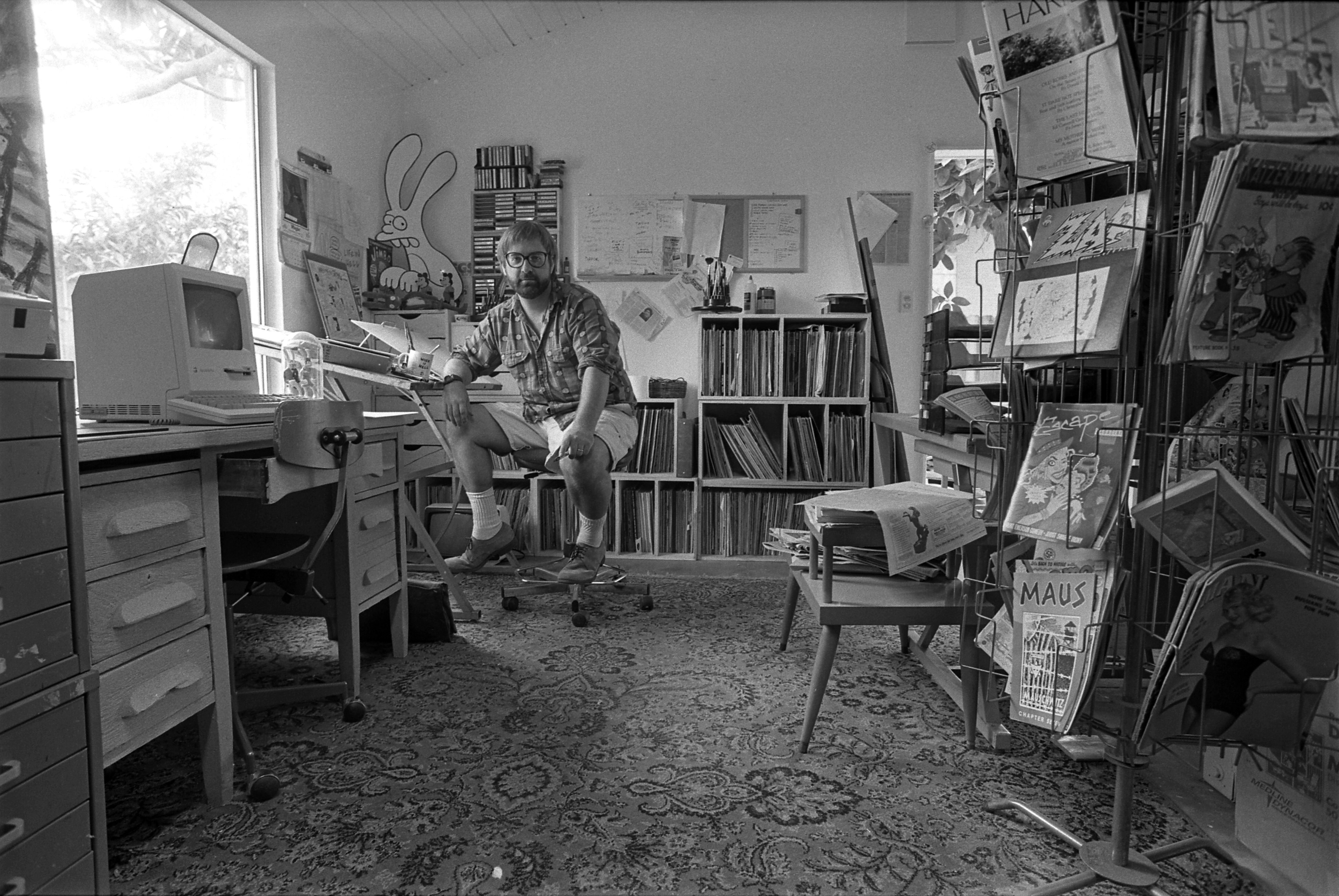
Groening in his studio, 1987

In 1993, Groening formed Bongo Comics (named after the character Bongo from Life in Hell) with Steve Vance, Cindy Vance and Bill Morrison, which publishes comic books based on The Simpsons and Futurama (including Futurama Simpsons Infinitely Secret Crossover Crisis, a crossover between the two), as well as a few original titles. According to Groening, the goal with Bongo is to "[try] to bring humor into the fairly grim comic book market". He also formed Zongo Comics in 1995, an imprint of Bongo that published comics for more mature readers, which included three issues of Mary Fleener's Fleener and seven issues of his close friend Gary Panter's Jimbo comics.

Groening is known for his eclectic taste in music. His favorite artist is Frank Zappa and The Mothers of Invention and his favorite album is Trout Mask Replica by Captain Beefheart (which was produced by Zappa). He guest-edited Da Capo Press' Best Music Writing 2003 and curated a US All Tomorrow's Parties music festival in 2003. He illustrated the cover of Frank Zappa's posthumous album Frank Zappa Plays the Music of Frank Zappa: A Memorial Tribute (1996). In May 2010, he curated another edition of All Tomorrow's Parties in Minehead, England. He also plays the drums in the all-author rock and roll band The Rock Bottom Remainders (although he is listed as the cowbell player), whose other members include Dave Barry, Ridley Pearson, Scott Turow, Amy Tan, James McBride, Mitch Albom, Roy Blount Jr., Stephen King, Kathi Kamen Goldmark, Sam Barry and Greg Iles. In July 2013, Groening co-authored Hard Listening (2013) with the rest of the Rock Bottom Remainders (published by Coliloquy, LLC).

== Personal life ==
Groening married Deborah Caplan in 1986, and they had two sons together: Homer (who goes by Will) and Abe, both of whom Groening occasionally portrays as rabbits in Life in Hell. The couple divorced in 1999.

In 2011, Groening married Agustina Picasso, an Argentine artist, after a four-year relationship, and became stepfather to her daughter Camila Costantini. In May 2013, Picasso gave birth to Nathaniel Philip Picasso Groening, named after writer Nathanael West. She joked that "his godfather is SpongeBob's creator". In 2015, Groening's daughters Luna Margaret and India Mia were born. On June 16, 2018, he became the father of twins for a second time when his wife gave birth to Sol Matthew and Venus Ruth, announced via Instagram. In 2020, their daughter Nirvana was born. In January 2022, they had another child, Satori. In 2024, they had their eighth child together, Shivani, Groening's tenth. They live in Santa Monica, California.

Groening's brother-in-law is Craig Bartlett, the creator of Hey Arnold!, Dinosaur Train, and Ready Jet Go!. He was married to Groening's sister, Lisa, but they separated in 2015. Bartlett used to appear in Simpsons Illustrated. Groening is an agnostic.

=== Politics ===
Groening has made a number of campaign contributions, all towards Democratic Party candidates and organizations. He has donated money to the unsuccessful presidential campaigns of Democratic candidates Al Gore in 2000 and John Kerry in 2004, as well as previously donating to Kerry's campaign for Senator from Massachusetts. Groening also collectively donated to the Democratic senatorial campaign committee and to the Senate campaigns of Barbara Boxer (California), Dianne Feinstein (California), Paul Simon (Illinois), Ted Kennedy (Massachusetts), Carl Levin (Michigan), Hillary Clinton (New York), Harvey Gantt (North Carolina), Howard Metzenbaum (Ohio), and Tom Bruggere (Oregon). He also donated to the now-defunct Hollywood Women's Political Committee, which supported and campaigned for the Democratic Party. His first cousin on his father's side, Laurie Monnes Anderson, was a member of the Oregon State Senate, representing eastern Multnomah County.

In an interview with Wired from 1999, he stated that if he were president, his first act would be "campaign finance reform", observing that modern campaign funding is "a real detriment to democracy".

Groening has a great disdain towards former President Richard Nixon, and enjoyed ridiculing him by making him the butt of jokes in The Simpsons and Futurama.

== Influences ==
Groening has cited cartoonists Robert Crumb, Kim Deitch, Dr. Seuss, Jules Feiffer, Al Capp, Charles M. Schulz, Walt Kelly, George Herriman, Charles Addams, James Thurber, Ronald Searle, Ernie Bushmiller, Carl Barks, E.C. Segar, and Lynda Barry as well as Golden Age animators such as Walt Disney, Bob Clampett, Max Fleischer, Tex Avery, Chuck Jones, and Jay Ward as influences on his animation. He also admires The Twilight Zone, Casablanca, Nick Park, Brad Bird, Eric Goldberg, Jeff Smith, Mike Judge, Scott McCloud, Ralph Bakshi, Bill Watterson, Art Spiegelman, Bill Plympton, Hayao Miyazaki, Don Hertzfeldt, Roger Corman, George Lucas, Orson Welles, Frank Capra, Hanna-Barbera, Stephen Hillenburg, Monty Python, Woody Allen, Phil Hartman, Steven Spielberg, Stanley Kubrick, Jim Henson, Alfred Hitchcock, Francis Ford Coppola, Victor Fleming, James Cameron, Martin Scorsese, John Kricfalusi, Leonard Nimoy, Pendleton Ward, Walter Lantz, Ishirō Honda, James Whale, Ub Iwerks, South Park, Joe Matt, Mel Blanc, Mel Brooks and Jackie Chan.

== Filmography ==
=== Film ===
Year	Title	Role	Notes
2004	Hair High	Dill (voice)	
2004	Comic Book: The Movie	Himself	Cameo
2006	Tales of the Rat Fink	Finkster (voice)	
2007	The Simpsons Movie	—N/a	Writer and producer
2007	Futurama: Bender's Big Score	—N/a	Direct-to-DVD; Executive producer
2008	Futurama: The Beast with a Billion Backs	—N/a	Direct-to-DVD; Executive producer
2008	Futurama: Bender's Game	—N/a	Direct-to-DVD; Executive producer
2009	Futurama: Into the Wild Green Yonder	—N/a	Direct-to-DVD; Executive producer
2012	The Longest Daycare	—N/a	Short film Writer and producer
2013	I Know That Voice	Himself	Documentary
2015	A Grand Night In: The Story of Aardman	Himself	Documentary
2015	I Thought I Told You to Shut Up!!	Himself	Short documentary
2020	Playdate with Destiny	—N/a	Short film Writer and producer
2021	The Force Awakens from Its Nap	—N/a	Short film Producer
2021	The Good, the Bart, and the Loki	—N/a	Short film Producer
2021	The Simpsons | Balenciaga	—N/a	Short film Producer
2021	Plusaversary	—N/a	Short film Producer
2022	When Billie Met Lisa	—N/a	Short film Producer
2022	Welcome to the Club	—N/a	Short film Producer
2022	The Simpsons Meet the Bocellis in "Feliz Navidad"	—N/a	Short film Producer
2023	Rogue Not Quite One	—N/a	Short film Producer
2024	May the 12th Be with You	—N/a	Short film Producer
2024	The Most Wonderful Time of the Year	—N/a	Short film Producer

=== Television ===
Year	Title	Role	Notes
1987–1989	The Tracey Ullman Show	—N/a	48 episodes; writer and animator
1989–present	The Simpsons	Himself	Creator, writer, executive producer, character designer and creative consultant Also appeared in 4 episodes as himself
1996	Space Ghost Coast to Coast	Himself	Episode: "Glen Campbell"
1999	Olive, the Other Reindeer	Arturo (voice)	TV special; executive producer
1999–2003; 2008–2013; 2023–present	Futurama	Himself	Creator, writer, and executive producer Also appeared in Episode: "Lrrreconcilable Ndndifferences" as himself
2015	Portlandia	Himself	Episode: "Fashion"
2018–2023	Disenchantment	—N/a	Creator, writer, and executive producer

=== Video games ===
Year	Title	Voice
2007	The Simpsons Game	Himself
2014	The Simpsons: Tapped Out	Himself

=== Music video ===
Year	Title	Artist	Notes
1990	"Do the Bartman"	Nancy Cartwright	Executive producer

=== Theme park ===
Year	Title	Notes
2008	The Simpsons Ride	Producer

== Awards ==
Groening has been nominated for 41 Emmy Awards and has won thirteen, eleven for The Simpsons and two for Futurama in the "Outstanding Animated Program (for programming one hour or less)" category. Groening received the 2002 National Cartoonist Society Reuben Award, and had been nominated for the same award in 2000. He received a British Comedy Award for "outstanding contribution to comedy" in 2004. In 2007, he was ranked fourth (and highest American by birth) in a list of the "top 100 living geniuses", published by British newspaper The Daily Telegraph.

He was awarded the Inkpot Award in 1988.

He received the 2,459th star on the Hollywood Walk of Fame on February 14, 2012.

== Bibliography ==
- Groening, Matt (1977–2012). Life in Hell
- Groening, Matt, Love is Hell, First Edition, self-published by Deborah Caplan, (1984)
- Groening, Matt, Work is Hell, First Edition, self-published by Deborah Caplan, (1985)
- Love Is Hell (1986) ISBN 0-394-74454-3
  - Work Is Hell (1986) ISBN 0-394-74864-6
  - School Is Hell (1987) ISBN 0-394-75091-8
  - Box Full of Hell (1988) ISBN 0-679-72111-8
  - Childhood Is Hell (1988) ISBN 0-679-72055-3
  - Greetings from Hell (1989) ISBN 0-679-72678-0
  - Akbar and Jeff's Guide to Life (1989) ISBN 0-679-72680-2
  - The Big Book of Hell (1990) ISBN 0-679-72759-0
  - With Love from Hell (1991) ISBN 0-06-096583-5
  - How to Go to Hell (1991) ISBN 0-06-096879-6
  - The Road to Hell (1992) ISBN 0-06-096950-4
  - Binky's Guide to Love (1994) ISBN 0-06-095078-1
  - Love Is Hell: Special Ultra Jumbo 10th Anniversary Edition (1994) ISBN 0-679-75665-5
  - The Huge Book of Hell (1997) ISBN 0-14-026310-1
  - Will and Abe's Guide to the Universe (2007) ISBN 0-06-134037-5
- Chocano, Carina (January 30, 2001). "Matt Groening". Salon.com. Archived from the original on September 5, 2007.
- Groening, Matt (1994). "Introduction". Love is Hell: Special Ultra Jumbo 10th Anniversary Edition. New York: Pantheon Books. ISBN 0-679-75665-5.
- Groening, Matt (1997). Richmond, Ray; Coffman, Antonia (eds.). The Simpsons: A Complete Guide to Our Favorite Family (1st ed.). New York: HarperPerennial. ISBN 978-0-06-095252-5. LCCN 98141857. OCLC 37796735. OL 433519M.
- Groening, Matt (2001a). "My Rock 'n' Roll Life, Part One: So You Want To Snort Derisively". Simpsons Comics Royale. New York: Perennial. ISBN 0-06-093378-X.
- Groening, Matt (2001b). "47 Secrets About The Simpsons, A Poem of Sorts, and Some Filler". Simpsons Comics Royale. New York: Perennial. ISBN 0-06-093378-X.
- Groening, Matt (2001c). "The Secret Life of Lisa Simpson". Simpsons Comics Royale. New York: Perennial. ISBN 0-06-093378-X.
- Groth, Gary (April 1991). "Matt Groening". The Comics Journal (141): 78–95.
- Lloyd, Robert (March 24, 1999). "Life in the 31st century". LA Weekly. Archived from the original on October 14, 2013.
- Morgenstern, Joe (April 29, 1990). "Bart Simpson's Real Father". Los Angeles Times Magazine. pp. 12–18, 20, 22.
- Ortved, John (August 2007). "Simpson Family Values". Vanity Fair. No. 564. pp. 70–77. Archived from the original on September 13, 2007.
- Paul, Alan (September 30, 1995). "Life in Hell". Flux Magazine. Archived from the original on February 8, 2007.
- Scott, A.O. (November 4, 2001). "Homer's Odyssey". The New York Times Magazine. pp. 42–47. Archived from the original on April 23, 2009.
- Turner, Chris (2004). Planet Simpson: How a Cartoon Masterpiece Documented an Era and Defined a Generation. Foreword by Douglas Coupland. (1st ed.). Toronto: Random House Canada. ISBN 978-0-679-31318-2. OCLC 55682258.
- Von Busack, Richard (November 2, 2001). "'Life' Before Homer". Metroactive. Archived from the original on March 5, 2010.
