= List of The Simpsons writers =

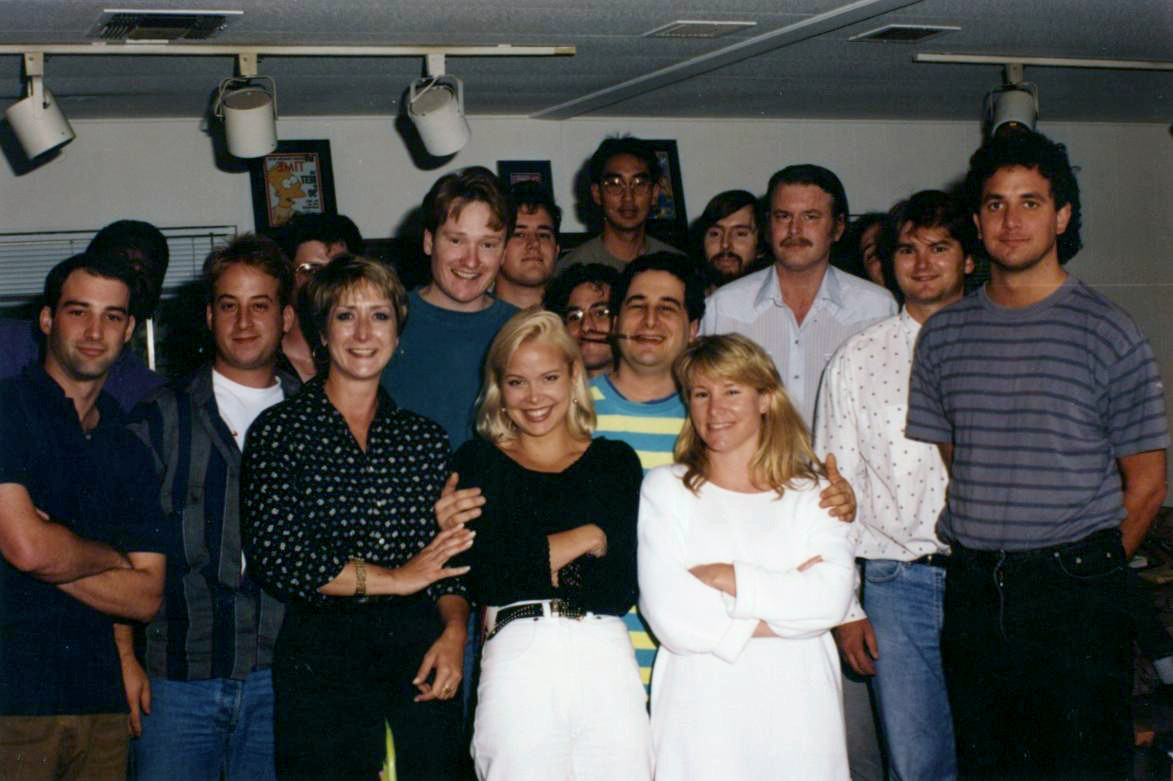
Part of the writing staff of The Simpsons in 1992. Back row, left to right: Mike Mendel, Colin ABV Lewis (partial), Jeff Goldstein, Al Jean (partial), Conan O'Brien, Bill Oakley, Josh Weinstein, Mike Reiss, Ken Tsumura, George Meyer, John Swartzwelder, Jon Vitti (partial), CJ Gibson and David M. Stern. Front row, left to right: Dee Capelli, Lona Williams and Unknown.

The following is a list of writers who have worked on the Fox animated television series The Simpsons in the order of first credited episode (by broadcast). As of November 15, 2026, 155 people have been credited with writing or co-writing at least one episode of The Simpsons.

== List of writers ==
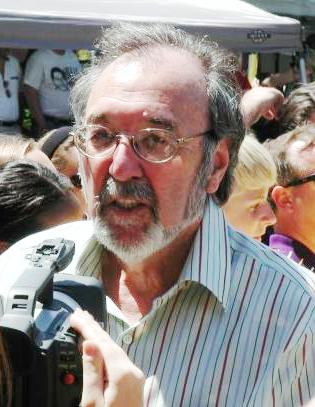
Although series developer James L. Brooks has never been credited with writing an episode of the television series, he did co-write The Simpsons Movie and the theatrical shorts The Longest Daycare and Playdate with Destiny.

#	Writer	Number written	Duration	Seasons	Notes
1	Mimi Pond	1	1989	1	
2	Jon Vitti	25	1990–95, 2002, 2004	1–7, 13, 15–16	Also co-wrote the screenplay for The Simpsons Movie
3	Jay Kogen & Wallace Wolodarsky	10	1990–93	1–4	
4	Al Jean	29	1990–92, 1995, 1997, 1999, 2001, 2014–15, 2017–18, 2020–21, 2023–25	1–4, 6, 8–12, 26, 29–37	Includes ten episodes co-written with Mike Reiss, one with David Mirkin, two with Joel H. Cohen & John Frink and one with Cohen & Jeff Westbrook (latter three story only); Also co-wrote The Simpsons Movie, The Longest Daycare, Playdate with Destiny, The Force Awakens from Its Nap, The Good, the Bart, and the Loki, Balenciaga, Plusaversary, When Billie Met Lisa, Welcome to the Club, Rogue Not Quite One, May the 12th Be with You and The Most Wonderful Time of the Year
5	Mike Reiss	10	1990–92, 1995, 1997	1–4, 6, 8	All episodes co-written with Al Jean; Also co-wrote the screenplay for The Simpsons Movie
6	John Swartzwelder	59	1990–2003	1–15	Also co-wrote the screenplay for The Simpsons Movie
7	Sam Simon	9	1990–92	1–4	Died 2015
8	Matt Groening	4	1990, 1992, 1996	1, 3, 7	Also wrote all The Simpsons shorts and co-wrote The Simpsons Movie, The Longest Daycare and Playdate with Destiny
9	George Meyer	12	1990–93, 1999–2001	1–5, 10–11, 13	Also co-wrote the screenplay for The Simpsons Movie
10	David M. Stern	9	1990–93, 1999, 2017	2–4, 10, 28	
11	Ken Levine & David Isaacs	2	1990–91	2–3	
12	Jeff Martin	14	1990–93, 2016–17, 2019, 2021	2–5, 27–28, 30, 32	Includes one co-written with Jenna Martin and one with Samantha Martin
13	Nell Scovell	2	1991, 2020	2, 32	
14	Steve Pepoon	1	1991	2	Died 2025
15	Brian K. Roberts	1	1991	2	
16	Howard Gewirtz	1	1991	3	
17	Robert Cohen	1	1991	3	
18	Thomas Chastain	1	1992	3	Story only Died 1994
19	Bill Oakley & Josh Weinstein	13	1992–95	4–7	
20	Conan O'Brien	4	1992–93	4–5	
21	Gary Apple & Michael Carrington	1	1992	4	
22	Frank Mula	3	1993, 2000	4–5, 11	Died 2021
23	Adam I. Lapidus	1	1993	4	
24	Greg Daniels	8	1993–96	5–7	Includes two co-written with Dan McGrath
25	Dan McGrath	4	1993–94	5–6	Includes two co-written with Greg Daniels; Died 2025
26	Bill Canterbury	2	1993	5	
27	David Mirkin	2	1994, 2015	5, 26	Includes one co-written with Al Jean; Also co-wrote the screenplays for The Simpsons Movie, The Longest Daycare, When Billie Met Lisa and May the 12th Be with You
28	David Richardson	1	1994	5	Died 2021
29	Jace Richdale	1	1994	5	
30	Mike Scully	13	1994–97, 1999–2002, 2023	6–11, 13–14, 35	Also co-wrote the screenplay for The Simpsons Movie
31	Bob Kushell	2	1994, 1996	6–7	
32	David X. Cohen	14	1994–98, 2020	6–10, 32	Credited as David S. Cohen on Seasons 6–10
33	Jonathan Collier	6	1994–97	6–8	
34	David Sacks	1	1994	6	
35	Jennifer Crittenden	5	1995–97	6–8	
36	Brent Forrester	4	1995–96	6–7	
37	Ken Keeler	7	1995–97	6–9	
38	Joshua Sternin & Jennifer Ventimilia	2	1995, 1998	6, 9	
39	Steve Tompkins	4	1995–97	7–8	
40	Dan Greaney	21	1995–2000, 2003–05, 2010, 2014–15, 2017, 2020, 2022, 2025	7–11, 14–15, 17, 21, 25, 27–28, 32, 34, 37	Includes four co-written with Allen Glazier, one with Donick Cary and one with Matt Selman. The hour-long episode "The Great Phatsby" is counted as two episodes. Also co-wrote The Most Wonderful Time of the Year
41	Richard Appel	7	1995–98	7–10	
42	Spike Feresten	1	1995	7	
43	Jack Barth	1	1996	7	
44	Rachel Pulido	2	1996–97	7–8	
45	Ian Maxtone-Graham	22	1996–2014	8–18, 20–25	Includes eight co-written with Billy Kimball. Also co-wrote the screenplay for The Simpsons Movie
46	Steve Young	1	1996	8	
47	Reid Harrison	2	1997, 2008	8, 19	Died 2024
48	Ron Hauge	7	1997–2000	8–11	
49	Donick Cary	7	1997–2000	8–11	Includes one co-written with Dan Greaney
50	Ned Goldreyer	2	1997–98	9	
51	Steve O'Donnell	2	1998	9	
52	Larry Doyle	7	1998–2001	9–12	
53	Brian Scully	3	1998–99	9–10	
54	Matt Selman	31	1998–2009, 2011–19, 2022, 2024	9–14, 16–19, 21–24, 26, 28, 30, 34, 36	Includes one episode co-written with Dan Greaney and one with Renee Ridgeley; Also co-wrote The Simpsons Movie, The Simpsons: Road Rage, The Simpsons Skateboarding, The Simpsons: Hit & Run, The Simpsons Game, and Playdate with Destiny
55	Jane O'Brien	1	1998	10	
56	Tom Martin	3	1999, 2001	10–12	
57	Tim Long	36	1999–2015, 2017–19, 2021–26	10–14, 16–18, 20–26, 29–34, 36, 38	Includes four episodes co-written with Miranda Thompson; Credited as a consultant writer on The Simpsons Movie and co-wrote The Simpsons: Road Rage, The Simpsons Skateboarding, The Simpsons: Hit & Run, and The Simpsons Game
58	Julie Thacker	3	1999–2001	10–12	
59	Carolyn Omine	30	2000–12, 2014–18, 2020–24, 2026	11–16, 18–19, 21–28, 30–37	Includes three co-written with William Wright, one with Robin Sayers and one with Kai Omine. The double-length episode "O C'mon All Ye Faithful" is counted as two episodes.
60	Dan Castellaneta & Deb Lacusta	9	2000, 2002, 2004, 2006, 2010–11, 2016, 2018	11, 13, 15, 17, 22–23, 28, 30	Includes one co-written with Peter Tilden and one with Vince Waldron
61	Rob LaZebnik	26	2000, 2009–21, 2023–26	12, 20–33, 35–36, 38	Includes one co-written with Brian Kelley & Dan Vebber (story only) and two with Johnny LaZebnik
62	John Frink	40	2000–05, 2007–25	12–15, 17–27, 29–35, 37	Includes nine co-written with Don Payne, three with Joel H. Cohen and one with Jeff Westbrook; Credited as a consultant writer on The Simpsons Movie and co-writer on The Good, the Bart, and the Loki
63	Don Payne	18	2000–10, 2013	12–21, 25	Includes nine co-written with John Frink and two with Mitchell H. Glazer. Died 2013.
64	Bob Bendetson	2	2001–02	12–13	
65	Joel H. Cohen	41	2001–26	13, 15–20, 22, 24–38	Includes three co-written with John Frink and one with Jeff Westbrook; Credited as a consultant writer on The Simpsons Movie, and co-writer on The Longest Daycare, The Force Awakens from Its Nap, Balenciaga, Plusaversary, Welcome to the Club and May the 12th Be with You
66	Dana Gould	7	2001–03, 2005–07	13–17, 19	
67	Bill Freiberger	1	2001	13	
68	Andrew Kreisberg	2	2002–03	13–14	
69	Josh Lieb	1	2002	13	
70	Matt Warburton	11	2002–08, 2010–12	13–16, 18–23	Also co-wrote The Simpsons: Hit & Run and The Simpsons Game
71	Marc Wilmore	12	2002–03, 2005–09, 2012–13, 2015	14, 16–17, 19–20, 23, 25–26	Died 2021.
72	Brian Kelley	23	2002–04, 2009–19, 2021–26	14–15, 20–22, 24–27, 29–35, 37–38	Includes one co-written with David Mandel, one with David Silverman and one with Dan Vebber
73	Kevin Curran	12	2002–10, 2014, 2018	14–18, 20–22, 25, 29	Died 2016
74	Brian Pollack & Mert Rich	1	2002	14	
75	Dennis Snee	1	2002	14	Died 2019
76	Neil Boushell & Sam O'Neal	1	2003	14	
77	Allen Glazier	4	2003–04, 2010, 2014	14–15, 21, 25	All co-written with Dan Greaney
78	J. Stewart Burns	29	2003–07, 2009, 2011–21, 2023–26	14–20, 23–29, 31–32, 34–36, 38	Also co-wrote Welcome to the Club and The Most Wonderful Time of the Year
79	Michael Price	28	2003, 2005–10, 2012–19, 2021–23, 2025–26	15–30, 32–35, 37	Credited as a consultant writer on The Simpsons Movie, and co-writer on The Longest Daycare, Playdate with Destiny, The Force Awakens from Its Nap and Balenciaga.
80	Robin J. Stein	1	2004	15	
81	Julie Chambers & David Chambers	1	2004	15	
82	Bill Odenkirk	15	2004–08, 2010–14, 2016–19	16, 18–22, 24, 26–29, 31	
83	Jeff Westbrook	29	2005–06, 2008–09, 2011–26	16–23, 25–26, 28–37	Includes one co-written with Joel H. Cohen & John Frink (story only), one co-written with Frink and one with Cohen; Credited as co-writer on The Good, the Bart, and the Loki, Rogue Not Quite One and May the 12th Be with You
84	Patric Verrone	1	2005	17	
85	Daniel Chun	6	2005–09	17–19, 21	
86	Stephanie Gillis	11	2005, 2007–2015, 2018	17, 19–27, 30	
87	Ricky Gervais	1	2006	17	Guest writer on the Season 17 episode "Homer Simpson, This Is Your Wife"
88	Peter Gaffney	2	2006, 2011	18, 22	Includes one co-written with Steve Viksten
89	Billy Kimball	9	2007–14	18–25	All but one co-written with Ian Maxtone-Graham
90	Mick Kelly	1	2007	19	
91	William Wright	3	2008, 2010, 2014	19, 21, 26	All co-written with Carolyn Omine; Died 2024
92	Matt Marshall	1	2009	20	
93	Valentina L. Garza	4	2009–10, 2013–14	20, 22, 24, 26	
94	Brendan Hay	1	2009	20	
95	Evan Goldberg & Seth Rogen	1	2009	21	Guest writers on the Season 21 episode "Homer the Whopper"
96	Mitchell H. Glazer	2	2010, 2013	21, 25	Both co-written with Don Payne
97	Michael Nobori	2	2010, 2013	21, 25	
98	Chris Cluess	1	2010	22	
99	Dick Blasucci	1	2011	22	
100	Steve Viksten	1	2011	22	Co-written with Peter Gaffney. Died 2014.
101	Justin Hurwitz	1	2011	23	
102	Dan Vebber	15	2011, 2016, 2018–26	23, 27, 29–36, 38	Includes one co-written with Brian Kelley; Also co-wrote Plusaversary and Rogue Not Quite One
103	Ben Joseph	1	2012	23	
104	David Mandel	1	2012	24	Co-written with Brian Kelley
105	Tom Gammill & Max Pross	6	2013, 2016–18, 2020	24, 28–29, 31	Also co-wrote the screenplay for Playdate with Destiny
106	Brian McConnachie	1	2013	24	Died 2024
107	Eric Kaplan	1	2013	24	
108	David H. Steinberg	1	2014	25	
109	Judd Apatow	1	2015	26	Guest writer on the Season 26 episode "Bart's New Friend"
110	Neil Campbell	1	2015	26	
111	Michael Ferris	2	2015, 2018	27, 30	
112	Eric Horsted	1	2016	27	
113	Dave King	1	2016	28	
114	Harry Shearer	1	2016	28	
115	Peter Tilden	1	2016	28	Co-written with Dan Castellaneta & Deb Lacusta
116	Ryan Koh	13	2016–19, 2021–22, 2024–26	28–35, 37	Also co-wrote Rogue Not Quite One
117	Ron Zimmerman	1	2017	28	
118	Simon Rich	1	2017	28	
119	Miranda Thompson	4	2017–19	29–31	All co-written with Tim Long
120	Daniel Furlong & Zach Posner	1	2018	29	
121	David Silverman	1	2018	29	Co-written with Brian Kelley; Also co-wrote the screenplay for Playdate with Destiny; The only person ever to both write and direct for the show
122	Renee Ridgeley	1	2018	30	Co-written with Matt Selman
123	Vince Waldron	1	2018	30	Co-written with Dan Castellaneta & Deb Lacusta
124	Robin Sayers	1	2018	30	Co-written with Carolyn Omine
125	Jane Becker	1	2019	30	
126	Megan Amram	3	2019, 2022	30, 33	
127	Nancy Cartwright	1	2019	30	
128	Jenna Martin	1	2019	30	Co-written with Jeff Martin
129	Max Cohn	1	2019	31	
130	Elisabeth Kiernan Averick	4	2020–21, 2023	31, 33, 35	Credited as co-writer on The Good, the Bart, and the Loki and When Billie Met Lisa
131	Pete Holmes	2	2020	31	Guest writer on the two-part Season 31 episodes "Warrin' Priests"
132	David Cryan	1	2020	32	
133	Cesar Mazariegos	9	2020–26	32–37	The two-part episode "A Serious Flanders" is counted as two episodes Credited as co-writer on When Billie Met Lisa
134	Julia Prescott	1	2020	32	
135	Danielle Weisberg	1	2020	32	
136	Jessica Conrad	9	2020, 2022–26	32, 34–38	Credited as co-writer on The Good, the Bart, and the Loki and Plusaversary
137	Samantha Martin	1	2021	32	Co-written with Jeff Martin
138	Christine Nangle	6	2021–22, 2024–26	32–34, 36–37	Also co-wrote Welcome to the Club
139	Nick Dahan	4	2021, 2024, 2026	33, 36–38	
140	Juliet Kaufman	2	2021, 2025	33, 37	
141	Johnny LaZebnik	2	2021, 2024	33, 36	Both co-written with Rob LaZebnik
142	Loni Steele Sosthand	5	2022–25	33–34, 36–37	Also co-wrote Plusaversary, Welcome to the Club and Rogue Not Quite One
143	Broti Gupta	6	2022–23, 2025–26	34–38	Also co-wrote When Billie Met Lisa and The Most Wonderful Time of the Year
144	Kai Omine	1	2026	37	Co-written with Carolyn Omine
