= The Simpsons Disney+ shorts =

Mini series for Disney streaming service

Several short promotional films based on the television series The Simpsons have been produced for Disney+. As of 2024, nine short films have been produced, beginning with The Force Awakens from Its Nap (2021), with its latest short being The Most Wonderful Time of the Year (2024).

All of the shorts were directed by longtime Simpsons director David Silverman and produced by Gracie Films and 20th Television Animation.

== Background ==
The Simpsons originated in animated shorts that aired as a recurring segment on the variety television series The Tracey Ullman Show for three seasons, before the characters spun off into The Simpsons, their own half-hour prime-time show.

Following the release of The Simpsons Movie, two theatrical shorts featuring Maggie Simpson were produced: The Longest Daycare (2012), released with Ice Age: Continental Drift, and Playdate with Destiny (2020), released with Onward.

When The Simpsons was added to Disney+, co-creator and executive producer James L. Brooks suggested the creation of a series of short films in which the Simpsons would "invade the rest of Disney+" as a way to promote The Simpsons and reach viewers who may not have been familiar with the series.

== Shorts ==
Title	Directed by	Written by	Original release date
The Force Awakens from Its Nap	David Silverman	Joel H. Cohen, Al Jean & Michael Price	May 4, 2021
The Good, the Bart, and the Loki	David Silverman	Elisabeth Kiernan Averick, Jessica Conrad, John Frink, Al Jean & Jeff Westbrook	July 7, 2021
Plusaversary	David Silverman	Joel H. Cohen, Jessica Conrad, Al Jean, Loni Steele Sosthand & Dan Vebber	November 12, 2021
When Billie Met Lisa	David Silverman	Elisabeth Kiernan Averick, Broti Gupta, Al Jean, Cesar Mazariegos & David Mirkin	April 22, 2022
Welcome to the Club	David Silverman	J. Stewart Burns, Joel H. Cohen, Al Jean, Christine Nangle & Loni Steele Sosthand	September 8, 2022
The Simpsons Meet the Bocellis in 'Feliz Navidad'	David Silverman	Joel H. Cohen, Al Jean, Ryan Koh & David Mirkin	December 15, 2022
Rogue Not Quite One	David Silverman	Al Jean, Ryan Koh, Loni Steele Sosthand, Dan Vebber & Jeff Westbrook	May 4, 2023
May the 12th Be with You	David Silverman	Joel H. Cohen, Al Jean, Ryan Koh, David Mirkin & Jeff Westbrook	May 10, 2024
The Most Wonderful Time of the Year	David Silverman	J. Stewart Burns, Dan Greaney, Broti Gupta & Al Jean	October 11, 2024

=== The Force Awakens from Its Nap ===
The Force Awakens from Its Nap was released on May 4, 2021, on Disney+ in celebration of Star Wars Day.

=== The Good, the Bart, and the Loki ===
The Good, the Bart, and the Loki is the second promotional short, after The Force Awakens from Its Nap, that ties in with Disney+'s brands and titles. The Good, the Bart, and the Loki is directed by David Silverman and celebrates the Marvel Cinematic Universe, particularly its television series Loki, with Tom Hiddleston reprising his role as Loki. The short was released on July 7, 2021, on Disney+, alongside the fifth episode of Loki.

=== Plusaversary ===
Plusaversary debuted on Disney+ for its second anniversary in 2021 and is the third promotional short produced for Disney+. The short was directed by David Silverman and released on November 12, 2021 – Disney+ Day. In the short film, there is a Disney+ party at Moe's Tavern and everyone is invited except Homer.

=== When Billie Met Lisa ===
When Billie Met Lisa is the fourth promotional short produced for Disney+. It features musician Billie Eilish Like the previous shorts, it was directed by David Silverman and released on April 22, 2022.

=== Welcome to the Club ===
Welcome to the Club is the fifth Simpsons short produced for Disney+. It was released in celebration of Disney+ Day on September 8, 2022. In the short, Lisa enters a castle in order to become recognized as an official Disney Princess, only to be persuaded through song by many classic Disney villains, to become a villain instead.

=== The Simpsons Meet the Bocellis in "Feliz Navidad" ===
The Simpsons Meet the Bocellis in "Feliz Navidad" is the sixth Simpsons short produced for Disney+. It was released on December 15, 2022. In the short, The Simpsons family celebrate Christmas, alongside Andrea Bocelli, and his family, Matteo Bocelli and Virginia Bocelli.

=== Rogue Not Quite One ===
Rogue Not Quite One is the seventh short produced for Disney+. It was released on May 4, 2023, in celebration of Star Wars Day and Disney's 100th anniversary.

=== May the 12th Be with You ===
May the 12th Be with You is the eighth short produced for Disney+. It was released on May 10, 2024 in honor of both Star Wars Day and Mother's Day. In the short, Marge and Maggie go on a day trip with several other Disney+ mothers and children to a planetary playground known as "Disney Playground Planet".

=== The Most Wonderful Time of the Year ===
The Most Wonderful Time of the Year is the ninth short produced for Disney+. It was released on October 11, 2024. In the short, Sideshow Bob and the Disney villains, along with Bart and other villains from other Disney franchises, sing a carol for Halloween.

== See also ==
- The Simpsons shorts, recurring segment on The Tracey Ullman Show which precede the Simpsons television series
- The Longest Daycare, 2012 short originally released theatrically
- Playdate with Destiny, 2020 short originally released theatrically
- "Te Deseo Lo Mejor", 2021 music video featuring the Bad Bunny song of the same name
- The Simpsons | Balenciaga, 2021 short produced with fashion house Balenciaga
