= AKOM =

South Korean animation studio

AKOM Production Ltd. (주)애이콤프로덕션
- Industry: Animation
- Founded: 1985; 41 years ago
- Founder: Nelson Shin
- Headquarters: Songpa-gu, Seoul, South Korea
- Products: Feature films, television series
- Website: www.akomkorea.com

AKOM Production, Ltd. (Animation Korea Movie; Korean: 애이콤 프로덕션) is a South Korean animation studio in Songpa-gu, Seoul that has provided much work since its conception in 1985 by Nelson Shin. It is most notable for the overseas animation of more than 200 episodes of The Simpsons, a total which continues to increase. In 2007, the studio produced a portion of the overseas animation for The Simpsons Movie.

Other well-known series that AKOM has been involved in including X-Men, The Tick, Tiny Toon Adventures, Animaniacs, Fraggle Rock: The Animated Series, Batman: The Animated Series, The Transformers, the first 11 seasons of PBS's Arthur, and five of The Land Before Time films.

== Animation Service ==
- Animaniacs (Seasons 1–4 and Back In Style)
- Arthur (Seasons 1–11)
- Attack of the Killer Tomatoes: The Animated Series (first season only)
- A Bunch of Munsch
- Bucky O'Hare and the Toad Wars!
- C Bear and Jamal
- Conan the Adventurer (first season only)
- Dilbert
- Dino Riders (episodes 3–13)
- Dooly the Little Dinosaur (opening, Season 1 episode 1, 2)
- Dr. Rabbit's World Tour (educational film)
- Dragon Flyz
- Earthworm Jim
- Exosquad
- G.I. Joe Extreme (Season 1)
- Garfield: A Tail of Two Kitties (Opening Titles)
- Gargoyles
- Huntik: Secrets & Seekers
- Invasion America
- Jackie Bison Show
- Jim Henson's Muppet Babies (Seasons 4-8)
- Kelly's Dream Club
- The Land Before Time (Films II–VI)
- Little Clowns of Happytown
- The Little Lulu Show (Season 3)
- Little Wizards
- Marsupilami
- McGee and Me!
- Mission Hill
- Mosaic (Opening Titles)
- My Little Pony
- My Little Pony Tales
- The Oblongs
- Peter Pan and the Pirates
- Pinky and the Brain
- Problem Child
- Red Planet (uncredited)
- Rescue Heroes
- Road Rovers
- Rude Dog and the Dweebs
- Savage Dragon
- Sesame Street ("Monster in the Mirror" celebrity version only, Simpsons cameo)
- Sgt. Savage and his Screaming Eagles
- Silver Surfer
- The Simpsons (including the movie, the ride, and the video game's animated cutscenes)
- Skeleton Warriors
- Spiral Zone
- The Spooktacular New Adventures of Casper
- Taz-Mania
- The Tick
- Toad Patrol
- The Transformers (3 episodes of Season 2, 14 episodes of Season 3, all of Season 4)
- Ultimate Book of Spells
- Wheel Squad
- Wunschpunsch
- X-Men

=== TV series ===
Title	Year	Client	Notes
Fraggle Rock: The Animated Series	1987	Marvel Productions	
Robocop: The Animated Series	1988	Marvel Productions	
Tiny Toon Adventures	1990–1992	Warner Bros. Animation	24 half-hour episodes: Cinemaniacs!, Furrball Follies, Life in the 90's, Stuff That Goes Bump in the Night, The Wacko World of Sports, Sawdust and Toonsil, A Quack in the Quarks, Animaniacs!, Psychic Fun-Omenom Day, Whale's Tales, Weirdest Story Ever Told, The Acme Home Shopping Show, Playtime Toons, Pledge Week, Elephant Issues, Toon Physics, Hog-Wild Hamton, A Cat's Eye View, Toons from the Crypt, Sports Shorts, Sepulveda Boulevard, Grandma's Dead, Fox Trot and Washingtoon
Batman: The Animated Series	1992–1993	Warner Bros. Animation	13 half-hour episodes: "Christmas with the Joker", "The Last Laugh", "Be a Clown", "The Cat and the Claw: Part 2", "Prophecy of Doom", "Feat of Clay: Part 1", "Mad as a Hatter", "Cat Scratch Fever", "The Strange Secret of Bruce Wayne", "Joker's Wild", "Moon of the Wolf", "What Is Reality?" and "The Mechanic". (AKOM was eventually fired due to its inconsistent animation in many episodes such as "Cat Scratch Fever" and "Moon of the Wolf".)
Earthworm Jim	1995-1996	Universal Cartoon Studios	http://www.akomkorea.com/eindex.php

=== Feature films ===
Title	Year	Client	Notes
My Little Pony: The Movie	1986	Marvel Productions; Sunbow Productions	with Toei Animation
The Land Before Time II: The Great Valley Adventure	1994	Universal Cartoon Studios	
The Land Before Time III: The Time of the Great Giving	1995	Universal Cartoon Studios	
The Land Before Time IV: Journey Through the Mists	1996	Universal Cartoon Studios	

=== Short films ===
Title	Year	Client	Notes
2012	The Longest Daycare	Gracie Films	
2020	Playdate with Destiny	Gracie Films	
2021	The Force Awakens from Its Nap	Gracie Films	
2021	The Good, the Bart, and the Loki	Gracie Films	
2021	Plusaversary	Gracie Films	
2022	When Billie Met Lisa	Gracie Films	
2022	Welcome to the Club	Gracie Films	
2022	The Simpsons Meet the Bocellis in "Feliz Navidad"	Gracie Films	
2023	Rogue Not Quite One	Gracie Films	
