= Richard Raynis =

American animator and television producer (born 1956)

- Born: December 27, 1956 (age 69); Los Angeles, California, U.S.
- Education: University of California, Los Angeles (BA)
- Occupations: Television producer, developer, director, animator

Richard Raynis (born December 27, 1956) is an American animator and television producer. He is a seven-time Primetime Emmy Award winner for his work as one of the main producers of The Simpsons. He is also known for co-creating several Adelaide Productions series such as Extreme Ghostbusters, Men in Black: The Series, Godzilla: The Series, Roughnecks: Starship Troopers Chronicles, and Heavy Gear: The Animated Series.

== Career ==
Raynis was born in 1956 in Los Angeles, and began his career in animation at the age of 21 on Ralph Bakshi's The Lord of the Rings (1978), working as a background illustrator. In 1982, he graduated from the University of California, Los Angeles with a degree in English literature. Raynis worked on several shows created by DIC Entertainment in the mid-1980s. He served as a writer and director on ALF: The Animated Series and ALF Tales, and directed numerous episodes of The Real Ghostbusters. In addition, he was an executive on shows such as The New Adventures of Beany and Cecil and Dennis the Menace. Raynis is known as one of the main producers of The Simpsons, for which he has won seven Primetime Emmy Awards for Outstanding Animated Program. He began working on the show during its third season while at Film Roman, where he also worked as a producer on the shows King of the Hill, The Critic, and Futurama.

At Adelaide Productions, Raynis worked on various animated series in the 1990s and 2000s. He was an executive producer of Jumanji, which ran from 1996 to 1999. Raynis co-created Extreme Ghostbusters (1997) and Godzilla: The Series (1998–2000) with Jeff Kline, and Men in Black: The Series (1997–2001), Roughnecks: Starship Troopers Chronicles (1999–2000), and Big Guy and Rusty the Boy Robot (1999–2001) with Kline and Duane Capizzi. He was also a producer on Dilbert, Max Steel, Jackie Chan Adventures, and Dragon Tales.

In film, Raynis was a supervising producer of The Simpsons Movie and the shorts The Longest Daycare and Playdate with Destiny. He also produced animation segments for the film The Edge of Seventeen along with David Silverman and various Simpsons staff.

== Filmography ==
=== Television ===
Year	Title	Notes
1985	Kidd Video	Director; season 2
1986–87	The Real Ghostbusters	Producer, director
1987–88	ALF: The Animated Series	Writer and director; season 1, producer
1987	Starcom: The U.S. Space Force	Producer
1988–89	ALF Tales	Producer, director
1988	COPS	Producer
1988	The New Adventures of Beany and Cecil	Production executive
1988	Dennis the Menace	Production executive
1989	Ring Raiders	Producer
1989–present	The Simpsons	Producer
1994–2001	The Critic	Producer
1995	The Nanny	Producer; "Oy to the World"
1996–99	Jumanji	Executive producer, main title designer
1996	Project G.e.e.K.e.R.	Supervising producer
1997	Extreme Ghostbusters	Developer, executive producer, main title director
1997–2001	Men in Black: The Series	Developer, executive producer, main title director
1997–2002	King of the Hill	Producer; seasons 1–3, consulting producer; season 4
1997–98	Channel Umptee-3	Executive producer for Columbia TriStar Television
1998–2000	Godzilla: The Series	Developer, executive producer, main title director
1999–2000	Dilbert	Supervising producer
1999–2002	Futurama	Consulting producer; seasons 1–4
1999–2000	Roughnecks: Starship Troopers Chronicles	Developer, executive producer, main title director
1999–2001	Big Guy and Rusty the Boy Robot	Developer, executive producer, main title director
1999–2000	Dragon Tales	Producer; season 1
2000	Max Steel	Executive producer, main title director; season 1
2000	Sammy	Executive producer
2000–2001	Jackie Chan Adventures	Executive producer; season 1
2001–2002	Heavy Gear: The Animated Series	Developer, executive producer

=== Film ===
Year	Title	Role	Notes
1978	The Lord of the Rings	—N/a	background illustrator (uncredited)
1989	Little Golden Book Land	—N/a	producer
1998	Storybook Friends - A Little Christmas Magic	—N/a	Short film supervising director and producer
2000	Maxine's Christmas Carol	—N/a	Supervising director
2007	The Simpsons Movie	—N/a	Supervising producer
2012	The Longest Daycare	—N/a	Short film Writer and producer
2014	The Simpsons Take the Bowl	—N/a	Short film producer
2016	The Edge of Seventeen	—N/a	animation producer
2016	Planet of the Couches	—N/a	Short film producer
2020	Playdate with Destiny	—N/a	Short film Writer and producer
2021	The Force Awakens from Its Nap	—N/a	Short film Producer
2021	The Good, the Bart, and the Loki	—N/a	Short film Producer
2021	The Simpsons | Balenciaga	—N/a	Short film Producer
2021	Plusaversary	—N/a	Short film Producer
2022	When Billie Met Lisa	—N/a	Short film Producer
2022	Welcome to the Club	—N/a	Short film Producer
2022	The Simpsons Meet the Bocellis in "Feliz Navidad"	—N/a	Short film Producer
2023	Rogue Not Quite One	—N/a	Short film Producer
2024	May the 12th Be with You	—N/a	Short film Producer
2024	The Most Wonderful Time of the Year	—N/a	Short film Producer
