= List of awards and nominations received by James L. Brooks =

James L. Brooks awards and nominations
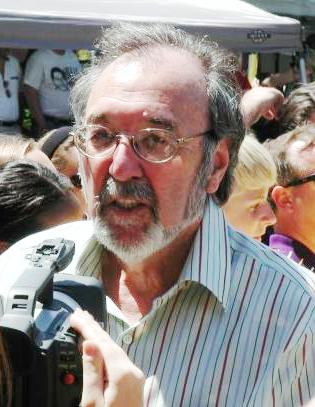
- Brooks in 2007
Award	Wins	Nominations
Academy Awards	3	8
Golden Globe Awards	1	6
Primetime Emmy Awards	22	62

James L. Brooks is an American filmmaker. He is known for his work as a writer-director-producer.

Brooks is mostly known for his film work often directing films such as Terms of Endearment (1983), Broadcast News (1987), and As Good as it Gets (1997). He has received eight Academy Award nominations winning three for Best Picture, Best Director, and Best Original Screenplay for Terms of Endearment. He also received six Golden Globe Award nominations winning for Best Screenplay for Terms of Endearment. He also received a Directors Guild of America Award, a Producers Guild of America Award, and a Writers Guild of America Award.

He is also known for his work on television including The Mary Tyler Moore Show, Taxi and The Simpsons. He has received 62 Primetime Emmy Award nominations winning 21 awards in various categories.

== Major associations ==
=== Academy Awards ===
Year	Category	Nominated work	Result	Ref.
1984	Best Picture	Terms of Endearment	Won	
1984	Best Director	Terms of Endearment	Won	
1984	Best Adapted Screenplay	Terms of Endearment	Won	
1988	Best Picture	Broadcast News	Nominated	
1988	Best Original Screenplay	Broadcast News	Nominated	
1997	Best Picture	Jerry Maguire	Nominated	
1998	Best Picture	As Good as it Gets	Nominated	
1998	Best Original Screenplay	As Good as it Gets	Nominated	

=== Golden Globe Award ===
Year	Category	Nominated work	Result	Ref.
1984	Best Director	Terms of Endearment	Nominated	
1984	Best Screenplay	Terms of Endearment	Won	
1988	Best Director	Broadcast News	Nominated	
1988	Best Screenplay	Broadcast News	Nominated	
1998	Best Director	As Good as it Gets	Nominated	
1998	Best Screenplay	As Good as it Gets	Nominated	

=== Primetime Emmy Awards ===
Year	Category	Nominated work	Result	Ref.
1971	Outstanding Comedy Series	The Mary Tyler Moore Show	Nominated	
1971	Outstanding New Series	The Mary Tyler Moore Show	Nominated	
1971	Outstanding Writing for a Comedy Series	The Mary Tyler Moore Show for "Support Your Local Mothers"	Won	
1972	Outstanding Comedy Series	The Mary Tyler Moore Show	Nominated	
1973	Outstanding Comedy Series	The Mary Tyler Moore Show	Nominated	
1973	Outstanding Writing for a Comedy Series	The Mary Tyler Moore Show for "The Good-Time News"	Nominated	
1974	Outstanding Comedy Series	The Mary Tyler Moore Show	Nominated	
1975	Outstanding Comedy Series	The Mary Tyler Moore Show	Won	
1975	Outstanding Comedy Series	Rhoda	Nominated	
1975	Outstanding Writing for a Comedy Series	Rhoda for "Rhoda's Wedding"	Nominated	
1976	Outstanding Comedy Series	The Mary Tyler Moore Show	Won	
1977	Outstanding Comedy Series	The Mary Tyler Moore Show	Won	
1977	Outstanding Writing for a Comedy Series	The Mary Tyler Moore Show for "The Last Show"	Won	
1978	Outstanding Drama Series	Lou Grant	Nominated	
1979	Outstanding Comedy Series	Taxi	Won	
1980	Outstanding Comedy Series	Taxi	Won	
1981	Outstanding Comedy Series	Taxi	Won	
1982	Outstanding Comedy Series	Taxi	Nominated	
1983	Outstanding Comedy Series	Taxi	Nominated	
1987	Outstanding Variety, Music or Comedy Program	The Tracey Ullman Show	Nominated	
1987	Outstanding Writing for a Variety, Music or Comedy Program	The Tracey Ullman Show	Nominated	
1988	Outstanding Variety, Music or Comedy Program	The Tracey Ullman Show	Nominated	
1988	Outstanding Writing for a Variety, Music or Comedy Program	The Tracey Ullman Show	Nominated	
1989	Outstanding Variety, Music or Comedy Program	The Tracey Ullman Show	Won	
1989	Outstanding Writing for a Variety, Music or Comedy Program	The Tracey Ullman Show	Nominated	
1990	Outstanding Animated Program (for Programming One Hour or Less)	The Simpsons for "Life on the Fast Lane"	Won	
1990	Outstanding Animated Program (for Programming One Hour or Less)	The Simpsons for "Simpsons Roasting on an Open Fire"	Nominated	
1990	Outstanding Variety, Music or Comedy Series	The Tracey Ullman Show	Nominated	
1990	Outstanding Variety, Music or Comedy Special	The Best of the Tracey Ullman Show	Nominated	
1990	Outstanding Writing for a Variety or Music Program	The Tracey Ullman Show	Won	
1991	Outstanding Animated Program (for Programming One Hour or Less)	The Simpsons for "Homer vs. Lisa and the 8th Commandment"	Won	
1992	Outstanding Animated Program (for Programming One Hour or Less)	The Simpsons for "Radio Bart"	Nominated	
1995	Outstanding Animated Program (for Programming One Hour or Less)	The Simpsons for "Lisa's Wedding"	Won	
1996	Outstanding Animated Program (for Programming One Hour or Less)	The Simpsons for "Treehouse of Horror VI"	Nominated	
1997	Outstanding Animated Program (for Programming One Hour or Less)	The Simpsons for "Homer's Phobia"	Won	
1998	Outstanding Animated Program (for Programming One Hour or Less)	The Simpsons for "Trash of the Titans"	Won	
1999	Outstanding Animated Program (for Programming One Hour or Less)	The Simpsons for "Viva Ned Flanders"	Nominated	
2000	Outstanding Animated Program (for Programming One Hour or Less)	The Simpsons for "Behind the Laughter"	Won	
2001	Outstanding Animated Program (for Programming One Hour or Less)	The Simpsons for "HOMR"	Won	
2002	Outstanding Animated Program (for Programming One Hour or Less)	The Simpsons for "She of Little Faith"	Nominated	
2003	Outstanding Animated Program (for Programming One Hour or Less)	The Simpsons for "Three Gays of the Condo"	Won	
2004	Outstanding Animated Program (for Programming One Hour or Less)	The Simpsons for "The Way We Weren't"	Nominated	
2005	Outstanding Animated Program (for Programming One Hour or Less)	The Simpsons for "Future-Drama"	Nominated	
2006	Outstanding Animated Program (for Programming One Hour or Less)	The Simpsons for "The Seemingly Never-Ending Story"	Won	
2007	Outstanding Animated Program (for Programming One Hour or Less)	The Simpsons for "The Haw-Hawed Couple"	Nominated	
2008	Outstanding Animated Program (for Programming One Hour or Less)	The Simpsons for "Eternal Moonshine of the Simpson Mind"	Won	
2009	Outstanding Animated Program (for Programming One Hour or Less)	The Simpsons for "Gone Maggie Gone"	Nominated	
2010	Outstanding Animated Program	The Simpsons for "Once Upon a Time in Springfield"	Nominated	
2011	Outstanding Animated Program	The Simpsons for "Angry Dad: The Movie"	Nominated	
2012	Outstanding Animated Program	The Simpsons for "Holidays of Future Passed"	Nominated	
2013	Outstanding Animated Program	The Simpsons for "Treehouse of Horror XXIII"	Nominated	
2015	Outstanding Animated Program	The Simpsons for "Treehouse of Horror XXV"	Nominated	
2016	Outstanding Animated Program	The Simpsons for "Halloween of Horror"	Nominated	
2017	Outstanding Animated Program	The Simpsons for "The Town"	Nominated	
2017	Outstanding Creative Achievement in Interactive Media within a Scripted Program	The Simpsons for "Planet of the Couches"	Nominated	
2018	Outstanding Animated Program	The Simpsons for "Gone Boy"	Nominated	
2019	Outstanding Animated Program	The Simpsons for "Mad About the Toy"	Won	
2020	Outstanding Animated Program	The Simpsons for "Thanksgiving of Horror"	Nominated	
2021	Outstanding Animated Program	The Simpsons for "The Dad-Feelings Limited"	Nominated	
2021	Outstanding Short Form Animated Program	The Simpsons for "The Force Awakens from Its Nap"	Nominated	
2022	Outstanding Animated Program	The Simpsons for "Pixelated and Afraid"	Nominated	
2022	Outstanding Short Form Animated Program	The Simpsons for "When Billie Met Lisa"	Nominated	
2023	Outstanding Animated Program	The Simpsons for "Treehouse of Horror XXXIII"	Won	
2024	Outstanding Animated Program	The Simpsons for "Night of the Living Wage"	Nominated	

== Guild awards ==
=== Directors Guild of America Awards ===
Year	Category	Nominated work	Result	Ref.
1983	Outstanding Director - Feature Film	Terms of Endearment	Won	
1987	Outstanding Director - Feature Film	Broadcast News	Nominated	
1997	Outstanding Director - Feature Film	As Good as it Gets	Nominated	

=== Producers Guild of America Awards ===
Year	Category	Nominated work	Result	Ref.
1997	Best Theatrical Motion Picture	As Good as it Gets	Nominated	
2017	Norman Lear Achievement Award In Television	n/a	Won	

=== Writers Guild of America Awards ===
Year	Category	Nominated work	Result	Ref.
1983	Best Adapted Screenplay	Terms of Endearment	Won	
1987	Best Original Screenplay	Broadcast News	Nominated	
1997	Best Original Screenplay	As Good as it Gets	Won	

== Miscellaneous awards ==
Year	Award	Category	Nominated work	Result	Ref.
1983	Los Angeles Film Critics Association	Best Director	Terms of Endearment	Won	
1983	Los Angeles Film Critics Association	Best Screenplay	Terms of Endearment	Won	
1983	National Board of Review	Best Director	Terms of Endearment	Won	
1987	Berlin International Film Festival	Golden Bear	Broadcast News	Nominated	
1987	Los Angeles Film Critics Association	Best Director	Broadcast News	2nd place	
1987	New York Film Critics Circle	Best Director	Broadcast News	Won	
1987	New York Film Critics Circle	Best Screenplay	Broadcast News	Won	
1987	Chicago Film Critics Association	Best Director	Broadcast News	Nominated	
1987	San Diego Film Critics Society	Best Original Screenplay	Broadcast News	Won	
1987	Satellite Award	Best Film	Broadcast News	Won	
1987	Southeastern Film Critics Association	Best Original Screenplay	Broadcast News	Won	
1987	Saturn Award	Best Fantasy Film	Big	Nominated	
2007	Saturn Award	Best Animated Film	The Simpsons Movie	Nominated	
