= BB-8 =

Robot character set in the Star Wars universe

- Star Wars character
- BB-8 from The Force Awakens
- First appearance: Star Wars: The Force Awakens (2015)
- Created by: Lawrence Kasdan; J. J. Abrams; Michael Arndt
- Voiced by: Ben Schwartz (consultant); Bill Hader (modulated via synthesizer)
- Performed by: Dave Chapman; Brian Herring

In-universe information
- Species: Astromech droid
- Affiliation: New Republic; Resistance; Team Fireball

BB-8 (or Beebee-Ate) is a droid character in the Star Wars franchise. He appeared in the three films of the sequel trilogy, Star Wars: The Force Awakens (2015), Star Wars: The Last Jedi (2017), and Star Wars: The Rise of Skywalker (2019). He also appeared as a major supporting character in the animated series Star Wars Resistance, appearing in the first 17 episodes of season 1. He is a BB astromech droid serving the Resistance, and is owned by Poe Dameron. Spherical with a free-moving domed head, BB-8 is portrayed by both a rod puppet and a remote-controlled robotic unit. The character has been well received by critics and fans, and has become one of the most beloved and recognizable characters of the Star Wars saga in recent years.

== Conception ==
=== Idea and design ===
BB-8's design was based on a sketch by The Force Awakens director J. J. Abrams. According to special effects artist Neal Scanlan, "It was a very simple sketch, beautiful in its simplicity of a ball with this little dome on top." His design included asymmetrical panels to make it easier for the viewer to track motion, because, Scanlan says, "If you had parallel patterns that ran around the circumference, they would be less informative as to the direction BB-8 was traveling".

Abrams also named the character, saying, "I named him BB-8 because it was almost onomatopoeia. It was sort of how he looked to me, with the 8, obviously, and then the two B's." The name was conceived early on in the film's production and was one of the few to remain unchanged. Before receiving his final name, the droid was nicknamed "Surly" by the pre-production team.

=== Constraints and realization ===
In August 2013, The Force Awakens cinematographer Daniel Mindel and Episode VIII director Rian Johnson each stated that Abrams would use little computer-generated imagery (CGI) and more practical, traditional special effects in order to recreate the visual realism and authenticity of the original Star Wars film. To that end, the droid BB-8 was a physical prop developed by Disney Research, created by Neal Scanlan and operated live on set with the actors. Seven BB-8 puppets were constructed for filming. The most prominent was a rod puppet, controlled by puppeteers Dave Chapman and Brian Herring. In addition, there were several radio controlled units and some static prop versions. A fully functioning, self-contained robotic unit was not practical for shooting, so most of the "walking" scenes were achieved by the puppet, with rods removed in post production. Later a self-standing remote controlled unit was constructed and used at promotional events.

=== Description ===
BB-8 is a spherical robot with a free-moving domed head. It is white, with orange and silver accents and a black optical lens on its headpiece. BB-8 also possesses multiple panels containing various tools or ports. Scanlan said of the robot's personality, "We always imagined BB-8 as being quite manipulative. I think he knows he's cute. He knows that he can win people over. And he uses that, like children do, to get his own way. In this film, he has a very important mission that he has to accomplish and so he uses his personality, his coyness, and all of those things." Of BB-8's gender he said, "I'm still not sure, dare I say, whether BB-8 is male or female ... BB-8 was female in our eyes. And then he or she became male. And that's all part of the evolution, not only visually, but in the way they move, how they hold themselves."

Calling the robot a "Swiss Army Knife that shouldn't be trusted", he noted that while each of the BB-8's panels has a specific purpose, like a port or tool, not all of them have been absolutely defined to leave options for future films.

=== Voice ===
The voice of BB-8 was supplied by comedians Bill Hader and Ben Schwartz, both credited as "BB-8 vocal consultants" in the film. The effect was created by Abrams manipulating Hader and Schwartz's voices through a talkbox attached to an iPad running a sound effects app.

== Appearances ==
=== In film ===
==== The Force Awakens (2015) ====
BB-8 was first seen in the 88-second The Force Awakens teaser trailer released by Lucasfilm on November 28, 2014. Its name was revealed by Entertainment Weekly in a Lucasfilm-designed Topps-style trading card mockup in December 2014.

In the film, the robot is the astromech droid of the Resistance X-wing fighter pilot Poe Dameron (Oscar Isaac). Poe entrusts it with a map that must be delivered to the Resistance headquarters in order to determine the whereabouts of Jedi Knight Luke Skywalker. While Poe is captured and interrogated by the sinister First Order warlord Kylo Ren, BB-8 flees across the desert of the planet Jakku and finds sanctuary with the plucky scavenger Rey. Eventually Rey, the renegade stormtrooper Finn, Han Solo, and Chewbacca bring BB-8 to Resistance leader Leia Organa, and ultimately reunite him with Poe.

==== The Last Jedi (2017) ====
In The Last Jedi, BB-8 fixes Poe's X-wing weapons system by smashing his head into it. In Canto Bight, a drunken gambler repeatedly inserts coins into a slot in BB-8, thinking he is a slot machine. The droid later subdues several guards, allowing Finn and Rose to escape imprisonment. BB-8 then uses the coins to subdue a fourth guard. Later, he operates a First Order AT-ST in order to rescue Finn and Rose after they are captured by the First Order.

==== The Rise of Skywalker (2019) ====
BB-8 appeared in The Rise of Skywalker where, in mission with Rey, Finn, Poe, Chewie and C-3PO on Pasaana eventually befriended a droid named D-O. Later followed them on Kef Bir and Exegol in the last war against Emperor Palpatine and the Sith Eternal. After celebrating the victory of the Resistance on Ajan Kloss, BB-8 followed Rey on Tatooine where she buried Luke and Leia's lightsabers in the Lars homestead and, in the end, the droid watched the binary sunrise along with her.

=== In television ===
==== Forces of Destiny (2017–18) ====
BB-8 makes several appearances in Star Wars Forces of Destiny. In "Sands of Jakku" and "BB-8 Bandits", both of which take place shortly after Rey finds him in The Force Awakens, Rey helps the droid evade a Nightwatcher worm and several bandits. In "Tracker Trouble", the droid, Rey, Finn, and Han help to get a tracker off the Millennium Falcon shortly after leaving Jakku. In "Shuttle Shock", which takes place during the journey to Canto Bight in The Last Jedi, BB-8 is overloaded by electrical shocks from a jellyfish monster, forcing Finn and Rose to try and fix it.

==== Star Wars Resistance (2018) ====
BB-8 is a supporting character in the 2018 first season of the animated television series Star Wars Resistance.

=== Other appearances ===
BB-8 appears in an episode of American Dad! named "The Witches of Langley" briefly as well as in the Family Guy episode "The Elle Word".

BB-8 made guests appearances in The Simpsons Disney+ shorts series The Force Awakens from Its Nap, Plusaversary, Rogue Not Quite One, and May the 12th Be with You.

==== Related media ====
BB-8 is a point of view character in both the 2015 novelization of The Force Awakens by Alan Dean Foster, and the 2017 novelization of The Last Jedi by Jason Fry. The droid also appears in the comic book series Star Wars: Poe Dameron, published by Marvel Comics in April 2016.

==== Merchandising ====
The official September 4, 2015 launch of all merchandise for The Force Awakens included an 11.4-centimeter-tall (4.5-inch) mobile app-enabled BB-8 robot toy developed by Sphero. Sphero had participated in a Disney-run startup accelerator program in July 2014, during which Disney CEO Bob Iger showed Sphero executives on-set photos and imagery of BB-8 before anyone outside of the production team knew of the robot's existence. Sphero acquired the license in November 2014, completing the development and production of the toy in time for its September 2015 release. Wired called the BB-8 toy "the only truly cutting-edge item" in the Force Awakens collection. In 2015, Sphero sold over 1 million of the robots.

Other BB-8 merchandising includes household items, luggage and bags, a life-size plush, a Lego Star Wars playset called Poe's X-wing Fighter, Hasbro's Star Wars: The Force Awakens Takodana Encounter set, and other action figures and other toys. The Lego versions of Poe and BB-8 have also appeared in the 2016 short form animated series Lego Star Wars: The Resistance Rises, and the short Poe Dameron vs the First Order Snowspeeder.

== Reception ==
Anthony Breznican of Entertainment Weekly wrote of BB-8 in November 2015, "He bowled us over immediately. From the moment Star Wars fans laid eyes on the droid with the roly-poly body and the babyface, it was love." The droid has been called a breakout character of the film, and of 2015. Time's Alex Fitzpatrick wrote in September 2015, "As a movie character, BB-8 feels destined to become a fan favorite. Some Star Wars fans have already tattooed likenesses of the droid on various parts of their body, and the movie isn't even out until December." Richard Roeper of the Chicago Sun-Times noted that "the hype for The Force Awakens has been so insane and the marketing so intense, we knew about BB-8 as a pricey and cool toy well before BB-8 ever made his big-screen debut. According to Tor.com:

We haven't even seen Star Wars: The Force Awakens but we (as in: humanity) don't need to in order to know that BB-8 is the break-out star. This soccer ball that thinks it is a robot is a masterpiece of evocative design that instantly evokes a galaxy far, far away. You see BB-8, even if only in silhouette, and you immediately think Star Wars. Rey and Finn and Poe's little pal is a hint of the continuing universe that will unfold with The Force Awakens, and a promise to fans that the filmmakers of the new films have a deep understanding of what makes Star Wars fun and mythic.

Peter Travers of Rolling Stone wrote that "no one can steal a scene from BB-8". The Hollywood Reporter's Todd McCarthy explained that the droid "serves as a welcome robot reboot from the sidelined (but hardly vanquished) R2-D2", and Emmet Asher-Perrin of Tor.com described BB-8 as "the perfect hybrid of R2-D2 and WALL-E". Entertainment Weekly's Chris Nashawaty called BB-8 "that rolling gyroscopic weeble that, if possible, may out-cute R2-D2". Ann Hornaday wrote in The Washington Post that "BB-8, a roly-poly little WALL-E of a creature, rolls, beeps and blinks with such puppy-ish charisma that R2-D2 and C-3PO might want to call their agents to make sure they're in the next installment. Stephanie Zacharek of Time also praised BB-8:

Abrams and his team of designers and technicians introduce a new star ... A roly-poly cueball with a surprisingly expressive half-dome for a head—and a vocabulary of squeaks and squiggles that are more eloquent than mere words—BB-8 is both modernist and old-fashioned at once, a marvelous creation that could have sprung from the imagination of Jules Verne.

BB-8 appeared with several other Force Awakens characters on the December 2015 cover of Rolling Stone, and alone on the cover of the December 18, 2015 issue of The Hollywood Reporter. The droid was also featured alone on one of two alternate covers of the December 14, 2015, issue of Time (the other cover featuring R2-D2). This was the first time the magazine has offered two covers for editions worldwide. The Time cover photographer, Marco Grob, said, "The moment you meet BB-8, you almost build some form of weird human connection. It has this really cute way of looking at you."

The Force Awakens received seven Visual Effects Society Award nominations, including one for Outstanding Models in a Photoreal or Animated Project for BB-8.
