= The Good, the Bart, and the Loki =

- Promotional poster
- Directed by: David Silverman
- Written by: Elisabeth Kiernan Averick; Jessica Conrad; John Frink; Al Jean; Jeff Westbrook
- Based on: The Simpsons by Matt Groening
- Produced by: James L. Brooks; Matt Groening; Al Jean; Matt Selman; John Frink; Richard Sakai; Denise Sirkot; Richard Raynis
- Starring: Dan Castellaneta; Nancy Cartwright; Yeardley Smith; Maurice LaMarche; Dawnn Lewis; Tom Hiddleston
- Edited by: Roger Injarusorn
- Production companies: Gracie Films; 20th Television Animation; AKOM Production Co.; 20th Television
- Distributed by: Disney Platform Distribution
- Release date: July 7, 2021
- Running time: 6 minutes
- Country: United States
- Language: English

The Good, the Bart, and the Loki (also known as The Simpsons: The Good, the Bart, and the Loki) is an American animated short film based on the television series The Simpsons produced by Gracie Films and 20th Television Animation for Disney+. It is the fourth short film in The Simpsons franchise, and the second promotional short, after The Force Awakens from Its Nap (2021), that ties in with Disney+'s brands and titles. The Good, the Bart, and the Loki is directed by David Silverman and celebrates the Marvel Cinematic Universe, particularly its television series Loki, with Tom Hiddleston reprising his role as Loki. The short was released on July 7, 2021, on Disney+, alongside the fifth episode of Loki.

== Plot ==
Odin banishes Loki to Springfield, where he lands at the Simpsons' home. Bart Simpson welcomes him inside, and while at dinner, Loki banishes Lisa to Asgard. There, Lisa comes across Mjolnir, granting her the powers of Thor. Lisa returns to Springfield with the "Springfield Avengers" (other citizens dressed as various Marvel Cinematic Universe characters) to exile Loki, who has since switched guises with Bart, resulting in Bart being exiled. Later that night while in Bart's room, Loki changes back, and is happy to finally be part of a functional family.

In a mid-credits scene, Loki disguised as Moe Szyslak gives patrons at Moe's Tavern free drinks. In two post-credits scenes, Ralph Wiggum as the Hulk smashes Loki similarly to a scene from The Avengers (2012), and Loki stands before Ravonna Renslayer at the Time Variance Authority, where she finds him guilty of his various crimes, such as crossing over to the Simpsons universe.

== Cast and characters ==
- Dan Castellaneta as Homer Simpson, Barney Gumble
- Nancy Cartwright as Bart Simpson, Ralph Wiggum
- Yeardley Smith as Lisa Simpson
- Maurice LaMarche as Odin: The ruler of Asgard, father of Thor, and adoptive father of Loki, based on the mythological deity of the same name.
- Dawnn Lewis as Ravonna Renslayer: A judge at the Time Variance Authority.
- Tom Hiddleston as Loki: Thor's adopted brother and the god of mischief, based on the Norse mythological deity of the same name.

== Production ==
=== Development ===
When The Simpsons was added to Disney+, co-creator and executive producer James L. Brooks had suggested the creation of a series of short films in which the Simpsons would "invade the rest of Disney+" as a way to promote The Simpsons and reach viewers who may not have been familiar with the series. By April 2021, which was the end of production on the first short, The Force Awakens from Its Nap, executive producer Al Jean felt the then-upcoming Marvel Studios series Loki would be a good candidate for the next crossover short and was hopeful to get Tom Hiddleston to reprise his role as Loki. In June 2021, The Good, the Bart, and the Loki was announced, with Hiddleston attached. The short's title is a parody of the Sergio Leone film The Good, the Bad and the Ugly (1966), and was directed by David Silverman.

=== Writing ===
Jean felt choosing which Springfield residents would be which members of the Avengers was "the most fun thing". Lisa Simpson was chosen to become Thor as a reference to Natalie Portman's Jane Foster becoming Thor in the Marvel Cinematic Universe (MCU) film Thor: Love and Thunder (2022), with Jean noting the parallels between Thor and Loki and Lisa and Bart Simpson were "pretty clear". The creative team had hoped to include a cameo appearance from Stan Lee, but Marvel Studios told them they stopped featuring Lee in cameos after his death in 2018. The team also wanted to include a "ridiculous amount of post-credit sequences for a four-minute short". The post-credits scene from Loki was based only on the first episode of the series, with the team having a week to complete it and add it to the film.

=== Casting ===
Tom Hiddleston reprises his role as Loki in the short. Marvel helped the Simpsons team get Hiddleston "on board"; he recorded his part remotely in England. Regular Simpsons voice actors Dan Castellaneta, Nancy Cartwright, and Yeardley Smith reprise their roles as Homer Simpson, Bart Simpson, and Lisa Simpson, respectively, while Maurice LaMarche voices Odin, and Dawnn Lewis voices Ravonna Renslayer.

== Music ==
Marvel Studios provided the music from The Avengers (2012) composed by Alan Silvestri to feature in The Good, the Bart, and the Loki.

== Release ==
The Good, the Bart, and the Loki was released on Disney+ on July 7, 2021, alongside "Journey into Mystery", the fifth episode of Loki. The promotional poster for the short was inspired by the poster for Avengers: Endgame (2019).

== Reception ==
Max Marriner at GameRant gave the short 2 out of 5 stars, saying it "embodies The Walt Disney Company at its coldest and most corporate" and was disappointed it did not feature any of the series' "signature snappy satire and absurdity", calling the humor "tired and drab". He did enjoy the art in the credits and the Simpsons design of Loki, but ultimately felt The Good, the Bart, and the Loki lacked the same passion Marvel Studios gave to their projects. In April 2022, Rich Knight of CinemaBlend ranked The Good, the Bart, and the Loki second on their list of The Simpsons shorts, believing it to be funnier than The Force Awakens from Its Nap and called the several mid-credits scenes the short's best part.
