= Playdate with Destiny =

2020 animated Simpsons short film

- Disney+ promotional poster
- Directed by: David Silverman
- Written by: Al Jean; Tom Gammill Max Pross; James L. Brooks; Matt Groening; Michael Price; Matt Selman; David Silverman
- Based on: The Simpsons by Matt Groening
- Produced by: James L. Brooks; Matt Groening; Al Jean; Matt Selman; Richard Raynis; Richard Sakai
- Starring: Chris Edgerly
- Music by: Jim Dooley
- Production companies: 20th Century Studios (Note: Animation outsourced to AKOM.); Gracie Films
- Distributed by: 20th Century Studios
- Release dates: March 6, 2020 (with Onward); April 10, 2020 (standalone, on Disney+)
- Running time: 5 minutes
- Country: United States
- Language: English

Maggie Simpson in "Playdate with Destiny", also known as Playdate with Destiny, is a 2020 American animated short film based on the animated television series The Simpsons. The film features Maggie Simpson. It is the first Simpsons short film released after the Disney acquisition of 20th Century Studios (formerly 20th Century Fox).

The film premiered on February 29, 2020, attached to advance screenings of the Disney/Pixar release Onward, with its general rollout on March 6, 2020. It is the third Simpsons film made for theatrical release, after The Simpsons Movie (2007) and The Longest Daycare (2012). The short was released on April 10, 2020 on Disney+.

== Plot ==
Maggie Simpson is taken to a playground by Marge. When another baby goes down the slide and almost crashes into her, she is saved by a boy named Hudson. Maggie becomes smitten with Hudson, and that's when the two play games together, which Maggie fantasizes as a whirlwind romance. At the end of the day, Maggie gives Hudson her blue bow to remember her by, and that night, she dreams about Hudson in her sleep.

The next day, Homer looks after Maggie instead of Marge, and decides he takes her to a different park with food trucks. Maggie sees Hudson waiting for her in the adjacent park, and desperately tries to get his attention, but fails when Homer pulls her away before she can. That night, Maggie drowns her sorrows in baby formula and becomes despondent over not being able to see Hudson.

The next day, Homer babysits Maggie again. Before he can take her to the same park as the day before, Maggie grabs hold of the car's steering wheel and steers it into the park where she met Hudson. She sees him boarding a train for children and runs across the park to catch up with him.

When Hudson sees Maggie trying to catch up with the train, he reaches out to her with her blue bow, but as she grabs her bow, Maggie fails to catch up before the train pulls away out of her reach. Maggie believes Hudson is gone forever, but is unaware that the train (running on a circular closed track) loops around to the station at which it started. Maggie and Hudson reunite on the train engine's cowcatcher, and exchange pacifiers (in lieu of sharing a kiss).

== Cast ==
- Chris Edgerly as Phonic Frog

== Production ==
Playdate with Destiny's plot was pitched by The Simpsons writers Tom Gammill and Max Pross as part of the episode of season 31, "The Incredible Lightness of Being a Baby." They began working on the episode, and executive producer Jim Brooks suggested using the plot for a short instead.

After 21st Century Fox's purchase by Disney, the Simpsons staff sent Playdate with Destiny to Bob Iger and the Disney staff. According to Al Jean, they asked "Can we please, please go in front of a Pixar movie?" Once approved, they requested to be shown with "something that's compatible"; the staff were "ecstatic" when offered Onward.

Disney's acquisition of 20th Century Studios is reflected in the short's introduction, showing a silhouette of Mickey Mouse before transitioning to Homer Simpson holding two donuts. Likewise, the logo for Gracie Films seen at the end of the short replaces one of the patrons with Mickey Mouse.

== Release ==
Playdate with Destiny was first announced to the public on the show's official Instagram on February 27, 2020. It was revealed that the short would be shown in theaters in the United States prior to screenings of the film Onward, starting on March 6, 2020.

It was released to the streaming service Disney+ on April 10, 2020.

== Followups ==
The Simpsons episode "The Incredible Lightness of Being a Baby" has been described as "an extension" and "a sequel," featuring a reappearance of Hudson.

A further short film featuring Maggie Simpson titled The Force Awakens from Its Nap released on Disney+ on May 4, 2021, Star Wars Day. It is the first of a series of shorts of The Simpsons, crossing over with other franchises on Disney+, throughout 2021. In 2023, another short film was released with Maggie Simpson celebrating Star Wars Day called Rogue Not Quite One.
