= The Longest Daycare =

2012 animated Simpsons short film directed by David Silverman

- Poster for the short film
- Directed by: David Silverman
- Written by: James L. Brooks; Matt Groening; Al Jean; David Mirkin; Michael Price; Joel H. Cohen
- Based on: The Simpsons by Matt Groening
- Produced by: James L. Brooks; Matt Groening; Al Jean; Richard Raynis; Richard Sakai
- Music by: Hans Zimmer
- Production companies: 20th Century Fox Animation (Note: Animation outsourced to AKOM Studios and Film Roman.); Gracie Films
- Distributed by: 20th Century Fox
- Release date: July 13, 2012 (with Ice Age: Continental Drift)
- Running time: 4 minutes
- Country: United States

Maggie Simpson in "The Longest Daycare" or simply The Longest Daycare, is a 2012 American animated 3D comedy short film based on the animated television series The Simpsons. In the film, Maggie Simpson is enrolled at a new daycare facility where she squares off with the foul-tempered Baby Gerald when she befriends a caterpillar. The short originated with Simpsons producer James L. Brooks, who enlisted long-time veteran of the series David Silverman to direct the film. The picture was written by producers Brooks, Al Jean, David Mirkin, writers Michael Price and Joel H. Cohen, as well as the show's creator Matt Groening, who also produced the short.

The film premiered on July 13, 2012, where it was attached to screenings of the 20th Century Fox release Ice Age: Continental Drift. The film is the second Simpsons theatrical release. The short was re-released on February 15, 2013, and played before the film Life of Pi in selected theaters in United States. Reception has been positive, praising the storytelling and animation. The film was nominated for an Academy Award for Best Animated Short Film in 2013.

== Plot ==
Marge Simpson drops off Maggie at the Ayn Rand School for Tots, where, after going through a security screening, she is classified as being of "average intelligence", by a machine manufactured by "Often-Wrong Technologies". A guard then carries her past the "Room for Gifted Babies" and puts her in the "Nothing Special" dreary corner. The playtime items are either taken away or eaten by the other babies. A butterfly then makes its way into the room as Maggie's nemesis, Baby Gerald, squashes and kills it on the wall with a mallet and draws a box around it with a crayon. Another butterfly also meets the same fate. Maggie finds a caterpillar and a pop-up book about the life cycle of the butterfly. Realizing that the caterpillar could also meet the fate of the first two butterflies, she tries to protect it from Gerald. The caterpillar later encases itself in a chrysalis and starts to transform. Once the newly formed butterfly emerges, Maggie tries to help it fly out of the window, but Gerald seemingly kills it by shutting the blinds on it as it attempts to pass through. Maggie dramatically mourns as she falls to the floor. Marge then arrives to pick her up, when it is revealed Maggie's scene was only a ruse to cover the truth: she had slipped her hair bow onto the windowsill and wore the butterfly on her forehead in its place. She then sets the butterfly free as Marge drives her home.

== Production ==
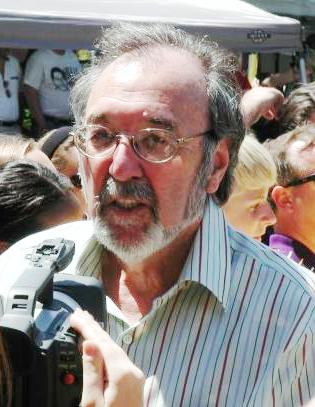
The Simpsons executive producer James L. Brooks conceived the idea of producing a short film based on the series.

In 2011, The Simpsons executive producer James L. Brooks proposed the idea of making a short film and releasing it in cinemas in front of a feature film, similar to how animation film studio Pixar creates shorts to play before their feature films. "He didn’t say anything about doing it in 3D, per se, but that was sort of the idea…that we would be doing it in 3D." He wanted the short to be a fun gift for the fans of The Simpsons, and according to the series' showrunner Al Jean, "We [the staff] just wanted to do this as a way of saying, 'We appreciate how much people have stayed with the show and watched it for 25 years.'" Brooks picked David Silverman, long-time veteran of the series and director of The Simpsons Movie (2007) to oversee the film. Silverman gave credit to Richard Sakai for the idea to produce the film in stereoscopic 3-D. He considered the reasoning for employing 3-D "hard to describe," noting that was largely an experiment and its genesis was born out of "having fun."

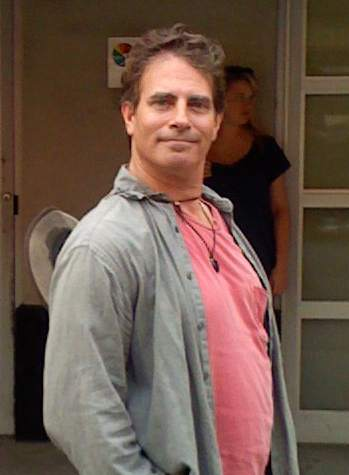
The film was directed by David Silverman.

The group first gathered in March 2011—consisting of Brooks, Silverman, Al Jean, David Mirkin, writers Joel Cohen and Michael Price, and Simpsons creator Matt Groening via phone—to pitch ideas for a short. Early on, it was decided to keep it entirely silent and employ Maggie as the lead character, and the setting of a daycare was decided upon. Jean wrote the treatment for the film, and Silverman completed an animatic of early story reels in June 2011. By the following February, the team regrouped to structure the story and formulate more ideas. With the help of Brad Ableson, Erick Tran and Ben Lane, the storyboards and animatic for the short were approved and the film entered production. Silverman himself animated two shots present in the final film.

Silverman and his crew began animation work on the short in March 2012, completing in May after just under ten weeks of production. He considered his crew "very experienced", noting that he worked with stereographer Eric Kurland for the 3-D shots. It was animated with The Simpsons's usual production pipeline, which involved sending shots to AKOM in South Korea, but with an amplified focus on the 3-D. The team would attempt to complete ten scenes to send to AKOM per week, which would be returned in a cleaned-up form after two weeks. Shots were then composited together at Film Roman out of necessity as the backgrounds relied on the 3-D. Most stereo elements for 3-D were picked out after shots were cleaned up, while others were manipulated in post-production with After Effects. The short was more costly than the average episode of the television show.

== Release ==
The Longest Daycare was first announced to the public in a title card at the end of the series' twenty-third-season finale "Lisa Goes Gaga" that aired on May 20, 2012. It was revealed that the short would be shown in theaters in the United States prior to screenings of the film Ice Age: Continental Drift, starting on July 13, 2012. A teaser trailer for The Longest Daycare, lasting approximately five seconds, was released on July 3, 2012. A 2D version of the short was displayed by the producers of The Simpsons at the series' panel at San Diego Comic-Con on July 14, 2012. It also played before the film Life of Pi in selected theaters in United States. After being nominated for the Academy Award for Best Animated Short Film in 2013, The Longest Daycare was released along with all the other 15 Oscar-nominated short films in theaters by ShortsHD.

The short was edited into The Simpsons 4D alongside Postcards from the Wedge

== Reception ==
The Longest Daycare has received critical acclaim. Many film critics have said that the short was better than Ice Age: Continental Drift. Claudia Puig of USA Today argued that "the brief tale is far more clever and whimsical than any sequence in Ice Age." Similarly, Sun Herald critic Leigh Paatsch said the short "displays all the wit and creativity missing from Continental Drift." San Francisco Chronicle writer Amy Biancolli commented that the short is "only a few minutes long, but those few minutes boast more imagination, pathos and suspense than the entire film that follows." Joe Williams of the St. Louis Post-Dispatch wrote that while the short takes place in a daycare, it ironically features more "artistic maturity" than Continental Drift.

The Longest Daycare has been praised for being both humorous and emotional. Puig and Biancolli described the short as "hilarious". Bill Goodykoontz of The Arizona Republic stated that the film is "terrific—sweet, sad, funny, surprising," and Kristian Lin of Fort Worth Weekly said it is "clever" and "surprisingly moving". Writing for Pioneer Press, Chris Hewitt noted that Maggie's interaction with Gerald "is hilarious and, ultimately, poignant in an animated film that covers more territory, all without dialogue, than most full-length movies." He went on to call the short a "triumph of storytelling, pacing and big-hearted humor."

A. O. Scott of The New York Times called the short a "charming 3-D cartoon" that is "witty and touching and marvelously concise". He added that it "cleverly blends the bright-colored flatness of the television show with the gimmickry of 3-D. It also upholds (more than the TV series itself) one of the golden rules of animation: no talking." Tim Martain of The Mercury has also described the short as "touching". The Boston Globe's Tom Russo thought the short was "a welcome throwback to the days when The Simpsons had more sentiment at its core, and wasn’t so much about the latest batch of newbie Ivy League writers taking their cues from Family Guy." In a joint review of the episode "Hardly Kirk-ing", Teresa Lopez of TV fanatic said "The Longest Daycare was a beautiful piece of animation showcasing a tender story of hope in an otherwise bleak environment. I feel like the only time The Simpsons can really exercise some creativity and depth is in these shorts and during the show's opening sequence."

== Spiritual sequels ==
Subsequent episodes involving Maggie as a protagonist have been produced including 2015's "Puffless" and 2020's "The Incredible Lightness of Being a Baby."

On March 6, 2020, a new short film with Maggie Simpson called Playdate with Destiny premiered with the release of Onward from Disney and Pixar, with a further short featuring Maggie Simpson titled The Force Awakens from Its Nap released on Disney+ on May 4, 2021, Star Wars Day. It is the first of a series of shorts featuring The Simpsons, crossing over with other franchises on Disney+, throughout 2021. In 2023, another short film was released with Maggie Simpson celebrating Star Wars Day called Rogue Not Quite One.
