= Welcome to the Club (2022 film) =

- Directed by: David Silverman
- Written by: J. Stewart Burns; Joel H. Cohen; Al Jean; Christine Nangle; Loni Steele Sosthand
- Based on: The Simpsons by Matt Groening
- Produced by: James L. Brooks; Matt Groening; Al Jean; Matt Selman; Joel H. Cohen; Richard Sakai; Denise Sirkot; Richard Raynis
- Music by: Bleeding Fingers Music
- Production companies: Gracie Films; 20th Television Animation
- Distributed by: Disney+ (Disney Platform Distribution)
- Release date: September 8, 2022
- Running time: 3 minutes
- Country: United States
- Language: English

Welcome to the Club is an American animated short film based on the television series The Simpsons produced by Gracie Films and 20th Television Animation, debuting on the streaming service Disney+ on September 8, 2022, and received mixed reviews from critics. Like the previous shorts, it was directed by David Silverman.

== Plot ==
Lisa and Bart approach a castle, and Lisa is excited to become an officially recognized Disney Princess. However, Bart turns out to have been a disguise by Loki to trick Lisa into instead joining forces with the Disney Villains. A musical number is performed by many Disney animated villains, such as Ursula from The Little Mermaid, Cruella de Vil from One Hundred and One Dalmatians, Captain Hook from Peter Pan, the Queen of Hearts from Alice in Wonderland, Maleficent from Sleeping Beauty, Evil Queen from Snow White and the Seven Dwarfs (in her witch form), Jafar from Aladdin, Hades from Hercules, Scar from The Lion King and Kaa from The Jungle Book, to try to convince Lisa to become a Disney villain. Lisa then points out that many Disney villains end up dying, to which the villains point out that it is better than living “happily ever after” with a generic Disney prince, with the musical number being followed by several Disney prince characters singing. Mickey Mouse interrupts the number, and the short ends with many of the Disney princes forming together the shape of Mickey's head on the floor.

== Release ==
Welcome to the Club was released on Disney+ Day on September 8, 2022. On September 1, the first promotional poster had been revealed, portraying Lisa Simpson and Ursula from The Little Mermaid parodying the last scene of the 1991 Ridley Scott film Thelma & Louise. Another poster, also portraying Lisa and Ursula, was released on the Disney+ Day.

== Cast ==
- Nancy Cartwright as Bart Simpson (actually Loki disguised as Bart) and Mickey Mouse
- Yeardley Smith as Lisa Simpson and Snow White
- Chris Edgerly as Prince Charming and Disney princes
- Dawnn Lewis as Kaa and Ursula
- Tress MacNeille as Cruella de Vil, Evil Queen and the Queen of Hearts
- Kevin Michael Richardson as Captain Hook and Disney princes
- Tom Hiddleston as Loki

== Reception ==
John Schwarz of Bubbleblabber gave Welcome to the Club a five out of ten stating "The late Pat Carroll is spinning in her grave for this one. Yes, we get another Tom Hiddleston cameo, but really this short is quite skippable. The song, while containing some funny lyrics, abruptly ends and really features no resolve to the initial bit the producers were trying to pull off with Lisa. As cool as it was to see The Simpsons again after several months off, the shorts are starting to irk me a bit in their execution".

Stacey Henley, journalist of TheGamer, criticized latest Disney+ short films, stating "Lisa sings a silly song, Kevin Michael Richardson voices Captain Hook with a ridiculously deep baritone, and the credits roll. Another entirely pointless venture that wastes what might have been a good idea. Even as a Treehouse short, which are desperately hit and miss these days, this might have had a chance. Instead the idea is wasted as a short that serves nobody aside from probably getting some curiosity clicks for Disney Plus."

J.S. Gornael of Collider ranked Welcome to the Club fifth of eleven in their top of The Simpsons shorts available on Disney+.
