= James L. Brooks =

American filmmaker (born 1940)

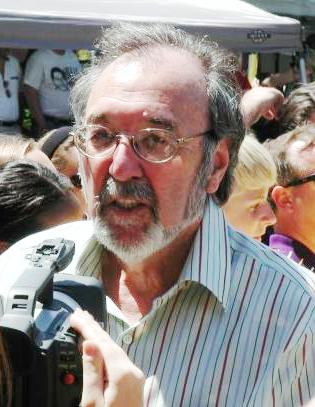
- Brooks in 2007
- Born: James Lawrence Brooks; May 9, 1940 (age 86); New York City, U.S.
- Occupations: Film director; producer; screenwriter
- Years active: 1965–present
- Political party: Democratic
- Spouses: Marianne Catherine Morrissey (m. 1964; div. 1972); Holly Beth Holmberg (m. 1978; div. 1999); Jennifer Simchowitz (m. 2024)
- Children: 4
- Awards: Full list

James Lawrence Brooks (born May 9, 1940) is an American filmmaker. He is the founder of Gracie Films and co-created the sitcoms The Mary Tyler Moore Show and Taxi, as well as co-developed The Simpsons. He also directed the films Terms of Endearment (1983), Broadcast News (1987), and As Good as It Gets (1997). In a career spanning six decades, Brooks received numerous accolades including three Academy Awards, 22 Emmy Awards, and a Golden Globe Award.

Brooks started his career as an usher at CBS, going on to write for the CBS News broadcasts. He then moved to Los Angeles in 1965 to work on David L. Wolper's documentaries. He wrote for My Mother the Car and My Friend Tony and created the series Room 222. Grant Tinker hired Brooks and producer Allan Burns at MTM Productions to create The Mary Tyler Moore Show in 1970. The series was successful, ran for seven season, and won numerous Primetime Emmy Awards. Brooks and Burns then created two successful spin-offs from Mary Tyler Moore: Rhoda (a comedy) and Lou Grant (a drama). Brooks left MTM Productions in 1978 to co-create the sitcom Taxi (1978–1983).

Brooks moved into feature film work when he wrote and co-produced Starting Over (1979). His next film was the acclaimed Terms of Endearment, which he produced, directed, and wrote, winning Academy Awards (for Best Picture, Best Director, and Best Adapted Screenplay) for all three roles. He subsequently earned acclaim for his films Broadcast News and As Good as It Gets. He received mixed reviews for I'll Do Anything (1994), Spanglish (2004), and How Do You Know (2010), and negative reviews for Ella McCay (2025). Brooks also produced the directorial debuts of Cameron Crowe–Say Anything... (1989)–and Wes Anderson, Bottle Rocket (1996).

In 1986, Brooks founded Gracie Films, a film and television production company. Although he did not intend to do so, Brooks returned to television in 1987 as the producer of The Tracey Ullman Show. He hired cartoonist Matt Groening to create a series of shorts for the television show, which led in 1989 to The Simpsons. It won numerous awards and is still running after over 37 years, becoming the longest-serving American primetime television series and the longest-serving American animated series and sitcom. Brooks also co-produced and co-wrote The Simpsons Movie (2007). Brooks has received 62 Emmy nominations, winning 22 of them.

== Early life ==
James Lawrence Brooks was born on May 9, 1940, in the Brooklyn borough of New York City, and raised in North Bergen, New Jersey. His parents, Dorothy Helen (née Sheinheit) and Edward M. Brooks, were both salespeople (his mother sold children's clothes; his father furniture). The Brooks family was Jewish; Edward Brooks changed his surname from Bernstein and claimed to be Irish. Brooks's father abandoned his mother when he found out she was pregnant with him, and lost contact with his son when Brooks was twelve. During the pregnancy, Brooks' father sent his wife a postcard stating that "If it's a boy, name him Jim." His mother died when he was 22. He has described his early life as "tough" with a "broken home, [and him being] poor and sort of lonely, that sort of stuff," later adding: "My father was sort of in-and-out and my mother worked long hours, so there was no choice but for me to be alone in the apartment a lot." He has an older sister, Diane, who helped look after him as a child and to whom he dedicated As Good as It Gets.

Brooks spent much of his childhood "surviving" and reading numerous comedic and scripted works, as well as writing. He sent comedic short stories out to publishers, and occasionally got positive responses, although none were published, and he did not believe he could make a career as a writer. Brooks attended Weehawken High School, but was not a high achiever. He was on his high school newspaper team and frequently secured interviews with celebrities, including Louis Armstrong. He lists some of his influences as Sid Caesar, Jack Benny, Lenny Bruce, Mike Nichols and Elaine May, as well as writers Mark Twain, Paddy Chayefsky and F. Scott Fitzgerald.

== Career ==
=== Television ===
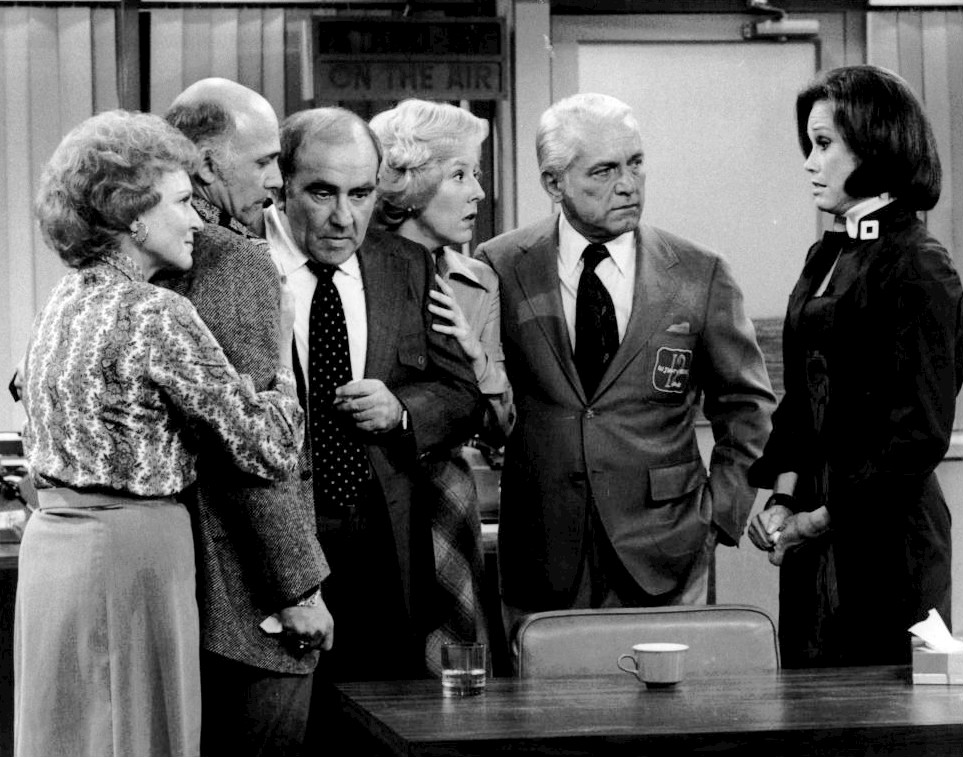
Brooks won several Emmy Awards for The Mary Tyler Moore Show.

Brooks dropped out of a public-relations program at New York University. Through his sister, who knew a secretary at CBS, he obtained a hosting job at the network's New York office — a position that typically required a college degree. For two weeks he filled in as a copywriter for CBS News and was given the job permanently when the original employee never returned. Brooks went on to become a writer for the news broadcasts, joining the Writers Guild of America and writing reports on events such as the assassination of President Kennedy. He moved to Los Angeles in 1965, to write for documentaries being produced by David L. Wolper, something he "still [hasn't] quite figured out how [he] got the guts to do," as his job at CBS was secure and well-paid. He worked as an associate producer on series such as Men in Crisis, but after six months he was laid off as the company was trying to cut back on expenses. Brooks did occasionally work for Wolper's company again, including on a National Geographic insect special.

Failing to find another job at a news agency, he met producer Allan Burns at a party. Burns got him a job on My Mother the Car where he was hired to rewrite a script after pitching some story ideas. Brooks then went on to write episodes of That Girl, The Andy Griffith Show and My Three Sons before Sheldon Leonard hired him as a story editor on My Friend Tony. In 1969 he created the series Room 222 for ABC, which lasted until 1974. Room 222 was the second series in American history to feature a black lead character, in this case high school teacher Pete Dixon played by Lloyd Haynes. The network felt the show was sensitive and so attempted to change the pilot story so that Dixon helped a white student rather than a black one, but Brooks prevented it. On the show Brooks worked with Gene Reynolds who taught him the importance of extensive and diligent research, which he conducted at Los Angeles High School for Room 222, and he used the technique on his subsequent works. Brooks left Room 222 as head writer after one year to work on other pilots and brought Burns in to produce the show. The Television Academy Foundation would point out that Room 222 "broke new narrative ground that would later be developed by the major sitcom factories of the 1970s, Grant Tinker's MTM Enterprises and Norman Lear's Tandem Productions" and also noted how the show even preceded Lear's 1970s sitcoms when it came to discussing "serious contemporary issues."

Brooks and Burns were hired by CBS programming executive Grant Tinker to create a series together with MTM Productions for Tinker's wife Mary Tyler Moore which became The Mary Tyler Moore Show. Drawing on his own background in journalism, Brooks set the show in a newsroom. Initially the show was unpopular with CBS executives who demanded Tinker fire Brooks and Burns. However the show was one of the beneficiaries of network president Fred Silverman's "rural purge"; executive Bob Wood also liked the show and moved it into a better timeslot. Brooks and Burns hired all of the show's staff themselves and eventually ended it of their own accord. The Mary Tyler Moore Show became a critical and commercial success and was the first show to feature an independent-minded, working woman, not reliant on a man, as its lead. Geoff Hammill of the Museum of Broadcast Communications described it as "one of the most acclaimed television programs ever produced" in US television history. During its seven-year period it received high praise from critics and numerous Primetime Emmy Awards, including for three years in a row Outstanding Comedy Series. In 2003 USA Today called it "one of the best shows ever to air on TV". In 1997 TV Guide selected a Mary Tyler Moore Show episode as the best TV episode ever and in 1999, Entertainment Weekly picked Mary's hat toss in the opening credits as television's second greatest moment.

With Mary Tyler Moore going strong, Brooks produced and wrote the TV film Thursday's Game, before creating the short-lived series Paul Sand in Friends and Lovers in 1974. He and Burns moved on to Rhoda, a spin-off of Mary Tyler Moore, taking Valerie Harper's character Rhoda Morgenstern into her own show. It was well received, lasting four years and earning Brooks several Emmys. The duo's next project came in 1977 in the shape of Lou Grant, a second Mary Tyler Moore spin-off starring Edward Asner as Grant, which they created along with Tinker. Unlike its source, however, the series was a drama. James Brown of the Museum of Broadcast Communications said it "explore[d] a knotty issue facing media people in contemporary society, focusing on how investigating and reporting those issues impact on the layers of personalities populating a complex newspaper publishing company." The show was also critically acclaimed, twice winning the Primetime Emmy Award for Outstanding Drama Series and also a Peabody Award.

Brooks left MTM Productions in 1978 and formed the John Charles Walters Company along with David Davis, Stan Daniels and Ed. Weinberger. They decided to produce Taxi, a show about a New York taxi company, which unlike the other MTM Productions focused on the "blue-collar male experience". Brooks and Davis had been inspired by the article "Night-Shifting for the Hip Fleet" by Mark Jacobson, which appeared in the September 22, 1975, issue of New York magazine. The show began on ABC in 1978 airing on Tuesday nights after Three's Company which generated high ratings and after two seasons it was moved to Wednesday. Its ratings fell and in 1982 it was canceled; NBC picked it up, but the ratings remained low and it was dropped after one season. Despite its ratings, it won three consecutive Outstanding Comedy Series Emmys. Brooks' last TV show produced before he began making films was The Associates (1979–1980) for ABC. Despite positive critical attention, the show was quickly canceled.

Alex Simon of Venice Magazine described Brooks as "[bringing] realism to the previously overstated world of television comedy. Brooks' fingerprints can now be seen in shows such as Seinfeld, Friends, Ally McBeal and numerous other shows from the 1980s and 1990s." Brooks' sitcoms were some of the first with a "focus on character" using an ensemble cast in a non-domestic situation.

=== Film ===
When I broke into movies, it was hard for anyone who had previously worked in television to break into the movies. It's easier now, but was almost impossible back then.

— Brooks in 2000

In 1978, Brooks began work on feature films. His first project was the 1979 film Starting Over which he wrote and co-produced with Alan J. Pakula. He adapted the screenplay from a novel by Dan Wakefield into a film The Washington Post called "a good-humored, heartening update of traditional romantic comedy" unlike the "drab" novel. The film received Oscar nominations for lead actress Jill Clayburgh and Candice Bergen for her supporting role.

Brooks' next project came in 1983, when he wrote, produced and directed Terms of Endearment, adapting the screenplay from Larry McMurtry's novel of the same name. It took Brooks four years to convince a studio to finance the film, which cost $8.5 million (equivalent to $28 million in 2026). Brooks won the Academy Awards for Best Picture, Director and Adapted Screenplay, while actors Shirley MacLaine and Jack Nicholson won Best Actress and Best Supporting Actor, respectively.

Brooks was fearful of the attention Oscar success would bring as he would be "deprived of a low profile", finding it "hard to work with the spotlight shining in your eyes." He added: "There's a danger of being seduced into being self-conscious, of being aware of your 'career'. That can be lethal." He also grew more concerned of the "threatening" corporate influence into the film industry at the expense of "the idea of the creative spirit". He channeled this ambivalence into Broadcast News. As a romantic comedy, Brooks felt he could say "something new...with that form", adding, "One of the things you're supposed to do every once in a while as a filmmaker is capture time and place. I was just glad there was some way to do it in a comedy." He cast William Hurt, Holly Hunter and Albert Brooks (no relation) in the three main roles.

He wished to set the film in a field he understood and opted for broadcast journalism. After talking with network journalists at the 1984 Republican National Convention, Brooks realized the field had "changed so much since I had been near it", and so "did about a year and a half of solid research" into the industry. When he began writing the screenplay, Brooks felt he "didn't like any of the three [main] characters", but decided not to change them and after two months had reversed his original opinion. Brooks stated that this also happens to the audience: "You're always supposed to arc your characters and you have this change and that's your dramatic purpose. But what I hope happens in this film is that the audience takes part in the arc. So what happens is that the movie doesn't select its own hero. It plays differently with each audience. The audience helps create the experience, depending on which character they hook onto." He did not decide on the ending of the film until the rest of it had been completed. Brooks wrote, directed, and produced Broadcast News, which was released on December 18, 1987, and received seven Academy Award nominations, including Best Picture and Best Original Screenplay for Brooks. At the 38th Berlin International Film Festival, the film was nominated for the Golden Bear and Holly Hunter won the Silver Bear for Best Actress.

His 1994 film I'll Do Anything, starring Nick Nolte, was conceived and filmed by Brooks as an old-fashioned movie musical and parody of "Hollywood lifestyles and movie clichés", costing $40 million ($90 million in 2026). It featured songs by Carole King, Prince, and Sinéad O'Connor, among others, with choreography by Twyla Tharp. When preview audience reactions to the music were overwhelmingly negative, all production numbers from the film were cut and Brooks wrote several new scenes, filming them over three days and spending seven weeks editing the film down to two hours. Brooks said, "Something like this not only tries one's soul – it threatens one's soul." While it was not unusual for Brooks to edit his films substantially after preview screenings, on this occasion he was "denied any privacy" because the media reported the negative reviews before its release and "it had to be good enough to counter all this bad publicity." It was a commercial failure, and Brooks attempted to produce a documentary about it four years later but was scuppered by failing to obtain the rights to Prince's song.

Brooks agreed to produce and direct Old Friends, a screenplay by Mark Andrus. Brooks said the screenplay "needed you to suspend disbelief" but realized that "my style when directing is that I really don't know how to get people to suspend disbelief." Brooks spent a year reworking the screenplay: "There were changes made and the emphasis was changed but it's the product, really, of a very unusual writing team," and the project became As Good as It Gets, taking a year to produce after funding had been secured. According to The New York Times, Brooks took an improvisational approach to directing the film, and "was constantly experimenting, constantly reshooting, constantly re-editing," and gave the actors the freedom to explore different tones.

The film garnered more praise than I'll Do Anything and Brooks was again nominated for the Academy Awards for Best Picture and Best Original Screenplay. As Good as It Gets received a total of seven Academy Award nominations and won two: Best Actress for Helen Hunt and Best Actor for Jack Nicholson—the second time Nicholson won the award for a role cast by Brooks. Jonathan Rosenbaum of the Chicago Reader labelled it Brooks' best film, writing that "what Brooks manages to do with [the characters] as they struggle mightily to connect with one another is funny, painful, beautiful, and basically truthful—a triumph for everyone involved." It ranked 140 in Empire's 2008 list of "The 500 Greatest Movies of All Time".

Brooks did not direct and write a film again for seven years until 2004's Spanglish. Filming took six months, ending in June with three days of additional filming in October; Brooks produced three endings for the film, shooting several scenes in "15 to 25 takes" as he did not feel the film was tonally complete, although the script did not change much during filming. He opted to cast Adam Sandler in a more dramatic role than his usual goofball comedy parts based on his performance in Punch-Drunk Love and Sandler's relationship with his family. Describing the length of production, Brooks said: "It's amazing how much more perverse you are as a writer than as a director. I remember just being so happy that I'd painted myself into some corners [while writing]. I thought that would make it interesting. When I had to wrestle with that as a director, it was a different story." Brooks's directing style "drove [the cast] bats", especially Téa Leoni, with Cloris Leachman (who replaced an ill Anne Bancroft a month into filming) describing it as "free-falling. You're not going for some result. It's just, throw it in the air and see where it lands." The film received mixed reviews from critics and was a box-office failure, grossing $55 million worldwide on an $80 million production budget.

His next film, entitled How Do You Know, was released December 17, 2010; Brooks produced, directed and wrote it. The film stars Reese Witherspoon as a professional softball player involved in a love triangle. Brooks began work on the film in 2005, wishing to create a film about a young female athlete. While interviewing numerous women for hundreds of hours in his research for the film he also became interested in "the dilemmas of contemporary business executives, who are sometimes held accountable by the law for corporate behavior of which they may not even be aware." He created Paul Rudd and Jack Nicholson's characters for this concept. Filming finished in November 2009, although Brooks later reshot the film's opening and ending. The New York Times described it as "perhaps the most closely guarded of Columbia's movies this year." Brooks was paid $10 million for the project, which cost $100 million. The film was negatively received. Patrick Goldstein wrote in the Los Angeles Times that "the characters were stick figures, the jokes were flat, the situations felt scarily insular." He felt the film showed Brooks had "finally lost his comic mojo" concluding "his films used to have a wonderfully restless, neurotic energy, but How Do You Know feels like it was phoned in from someone resting uncomfortably on his laurels." Variety's Peter Debruge also felt the film showed Brooks had lost his "spark". Richard Corliss of Time was more positive, writing "without being great, it's still the flat-out finest romantic comedy of the year," while "Brooks hasn't lost his gift for dreaming up heroes and heroines who worry amusingly."

After a fifteen-year break from feature filmmaking, Brooks directed Ella McCay (2025), a political comedy-drama film starring Emma Mackey in the title role and co-starring Jamie Lee Curtis, Woody Harrelson, Jack Lowden, Julie Kavner, and Albert Brooks.

Brooks started his own film and television production company, Gracie Films, in 1986. He produced Big (1988) and The War of the Roses (1989). Brooks mentored Cameron Crowe; he was the executive producer of Crowe's directorial debut Say Anything... (1989) and produced Jerry Maguire (1996), which was nominated for five Oscars and won one. Brooks also helped Owen Wilson and Wes Anderson after their feature-length script and short film version of Bottle Rocket (1996) were brought to his attention. Brooks went to Wilson and Anderson's apartment in Dallas after agreeing to produce the film. Wilson stated: "I think he felt kind of sorry for us". Despite having "the worst [script] reading [Brooks] had ever heard", Brooks kept faith in the project. Brooks produced and directed Brooklyn Laundry, his first theatrical production, in 1990. It starred Glenn Close, Woody Harrelson and Laura Dern. In 2007 Brooks appeared—along with Nora Ephron, Carrie Fisher and others in Dreams on Spec, a documentary about screenwriting in Hollywood.

=== Return to television ===
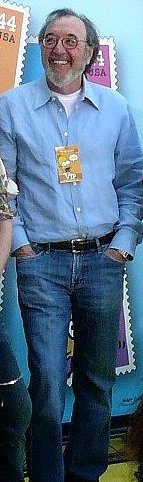
Brooks in 2009

Although Brooks "never meant" to return to television in the late 1980s, he was helping Tracey Ullman start The Tracey Ullman Show and when she could not find another producer, he stepped in. On the suggestion of friend and colleague Polly Platt, who gave Brooks the nine-panel Life in Hell cartoon entitled "The Los Angeles Way of Death" which hangs outside Brooks' Gracie Films office, Brooks asked Life in Hell cartoonist Matt Groening to pitch an idea for a series of animated shorts to appear on The Tracey Ullman Show. Groening initially intended to present an animated version of his Life in Hell series. However, when Groening realized that animating Life in Hell would require the rescinding of publication rights for his life's work, he chose another approach and formulated his version of a dysfunctional family in the lobby of Brooks' office. After the success of the shorts, the Fox Broadcasting Company in 1989 commissioned a series of half-hour episodes of the show, now called The Simpsons, which Brooks produced alongside Groening and Sam Simon. Brooks negotiated a provision in the contract with the Fox network that prevented Fox from interfering with the show's content. The Simpsons garnered critical and commercial acclaim, winning numerous awards including 37 Emmy Awards and two Peabody Awards as of January 2025. The Simpsons was still producing original content 35 years after it debuted in 1990. In a 1998 issue celebrating the 20th century's greatest achievements in arts and entertainment, Time magazine named The Simpsons the century's best television series. In 1997 Brooks was inducted into the Television Hall of Fame.

In 1995, Brooks and Groening were involved in a public dispute over the episode "A Star Is Burns". Groening felt that the episode was a thirty-minute advertisement for Brooks' show The Critic (which had moved to Fox from ABC for its second season), which was created by former The Simpsons showrunners Al Jean and Mike Reiss, and whose lead character Jay Sherman appears in the episode. He hoped Brooks would pull the episode because "articles began to appear in several newspapers around the country saying that [Groening] created The Critic", and remove his name from the credits. In response, Brooks said "I am furious with Matt. He's been going to everybody who wears a suit at Fox and complaining about this. When he voiced his concerns about how to draw The Critic into the Simpsons' universe, he was right and we agreed to his changes. Certainly, he's allowed his opinion, but airing this publicly in the press is going too far....He is a gifted, adorable, cuddly ingrate. But his behavior right now is rotten."

The Critic was short-lived, broadcasting ten episodes on Fox before its cancellation. A total of 23 episodes were produced, and it returned briefly in 2000 with a series of ten internet broadcast webisodes. The series has since developed a cult following thanks to reruns on Comedy Central and its complete-series release on DVD. Brooks' early-1990s shows Sibs and Phenom, both produced as part of a multi-show deal with ABC, and the 2001 show What About Joan for the same network, were all similarly short-lived.

Brooks co-produced and co-wrote the 2007 feature-length film adaptation of The Simpsons, The Simpsons Movie, which grossed $500 million. He directed the voice cast for the first time since the television show's early seasons. Dan Castellaneta found the recording sessions "more intense" than recording the television series, and "more emotionally dramatic". Some scenes, such as Marge's video message to Homer, were recorded over one hundred times, leaving the voice cast exhausted. Brooks conceived the idea for, co-produced and co-wrote the Maggie-centric short film The Longest Daycare, which played in front of Ice Age: Continental Drift in 2012. It was nominated for the Academy Award for Best Animated Short Film in 2013.

== Personal life ==
Brooks has been married three times. His first wife was Marianne Catherine Morrissey, whom he married in 1964; they have one daughter, Amy Lorraine. They divorced in 1972. In 1978, he married Holly Beth Holmberg, and they had three children together: daughter Chloe and sons Cooper and Joseph. They divorced in 1999. As of 2025, Brooks is married to Jennifer Simchowitz, whom he married in 2024.

He is also a member of the Alpha Epsilon Pi fraternity. In January 2017, Brooks stated in an interview with The Hollywood Reporter that his career was now just focused staying on with The Simpsons until the show ends and continuing to run into Steven Spielberg "in the market."

Brooks is an avid fan of the Los Angeles Clippers.

== Filmography ==
=== Film ===
Year	Title	Director	Writer	Producer
1979	Starting Over	No	Yes	Yes
1983	Terms of Endearment	Yes	Yes	Yes
1987	Broadcast News	Yes	Yes	Yes
1994	I'll Do Anything	Yes	Yes	Yes
1997	As Good as It Gets	Yes	Yes	Yes
2004	Spanglish	Yes	Yes	Yes
2007	The Simpsons Movie	No	Yes	Yes
2010	How Do You Know	Yes	Yes	Yes
2025	Ella McCay	Yes	Yes	Yes

Producer

- Big (1988)
- The War of the Roses (1989)
- Jerry Maguire (1996)
- Riding in Cars with Boys (2001)
- The Edge of Seventeen (2016)
- Are You There God? It's Me, Margaret. (2023)

Executive producer

- Say Anything... (1989)
- Bottle Rocket (1996)

Acting roles

Year	Title	Role	Notes
1979	Real Life	Driving Evaluator	
1981	Modern Romance	David	
1985	Lost in America	Party Guest	Uncredited

=== Short film ===
Year	Title	Writer	Producer
2012	The Longest Daycare	Yes	Yes
2020	Playdate with Destiny	Yes	Yes
2021	The Force Awakens from Its Nap	No	Yes
2021	The Good, the Bart, and the Loki	No	Yes
2021	The Simpsons | Balenciaga	No	Yes
2021	Plusaversary	No	Yes
2022	When Billie Met Lisa	No	Yes
2022	Welcome to the Club	No	Yes
2022	The Simpsons Meet the Bocellis in "Feliz Navidad"	No	Yes
2023	Rogue Not Quite One	No	Yes

=== Television ===
Year	Title	Writer	Creator	Producer	Notes
1965	Men in Crisis	Yes	No	Yes	2 episodes
1965	October Madness: The World Series	Yes	No	No	Television documentary
1965–1966	Time-Life Specials: The March of Time	Yes	No	No	3 episodes
1966	My Mother the Car	Yes	No	No	2 episodes
1966–1967	That Girl	Yes	No	No	3 episodes
1967	Hey, Landlord	Yes	No	No	Episode: "Sharin' Sharon"
1967	Accidental Family	Yes	No	No	Episode: "Hot Kid in a Cold Town"
1968	The Andy Griffith Show	Yes	No	No	2 episodes
1968	My Three Sons	Yes	No	No	Episode: "The Perfect Separation"
1968	The Doris Day Show	Yes	No	No	Episode: "The Job"
1968	Good Morning World	Yes	No	No	Episode: "Pot Luckless"
1968	Mayberry R.F.D.	Yes	No	No	Episode: "Youth Takes Over"
1969	My Friend Tony	Yes	No	No	Episode: "Encounter"
1969–1974	Room 222	Yes	Yes	No	113 episodes
1970–1977	The Mary Tyler Moore Show	Yes	Yes	Yes	168 episodes
1973	Going Places	Yes	No	No	TV short
1974	Paul Sand in Friends and Lovers	Yes	Yes	No	15 episodes
1974	Thursday's Game	No	Yes	Yes	TV movie
1974–1978	Rhoda	Yes	Yes	Yes	110 episodes
1975–1977	Phyllis	No	Yes	No	48 episodes, Also consultant
1977–1982	Lou Grant	Yes	Yes	Yes	114 episodes
1978	Cindy	No	No	Yes	TV movie
1978–1983	Taxi	Yes	Yes	Yes	114 episodes
1979–1980	The Associates	No	Yes	Yes	13 episodes
1980	Carlton Your Doorman	Yes	No	No	TV short
1987–1990	The Tracey Ullman Show	Yes	Yes	Yes	81 episodes
1989–present	The Simpsons	Yes	Developer	Yes	Also executive creative consultant
1991–1992	Sibs	No	No	Yes	22 episodes
1993	Phenom	No	No	Yes	22 episodes
1994–1995	The Critic	No	No	Yes	7 episodes
2001	What About Joan	No	No	Yes	21 episodes

Acting roles

Year	Title	Role	Episode
1972	The Mary Tyler Moore Show	Rabbi	"Enter Rhoda's Parents"
1974	Rhoda	Subway Passenger	"Rhoda's Wedding"
1976	Saturday Night Live	Paul Reynold	"Elliott Gould/Anne Murray"
2003	The Simpsons	Himself (voice)	"A Star Is Born Again"

== Accolades and honours ==
Brooks has received eight Academy Award nominations for Terms of Endearment (1983), Broadcast News (1987), Jerry Maguire (1996), and As Good as It Gets (1997). In 1984, Brooks received three Academy Awards for Best Picture, Best Director, and Best Adapted Screenplay for Terms of Endearment (1983). He has also earned 54 Primetime Emmy Awards nominations for his work on television. He has won for The Mary Tyler Moore Show, Taxi, Lou Grant, The Tracey Ullman Show, and The Simpsons. On August 11, 2024, he was awarded the title of Disney Legend at the D23 Expo. Brooks received two lifetime achievement awards from the Writers Guild of America: The Laurel Award for TV Writing Achievement in 1998 and the 2018 Laurel Award for Screenwriting Achievement in film.

Awards and nominations received by Brooks' films
Year	Title	Academy Awards		BAFTA Awards		Golden Globe Awards	
Year	Title	Nominations	Wins	Nominations	Wins	Nominations	Wins
1983	Terms of Endearment	11	5	1		6	3
1987	Broadcast News	7				5	
1997	As Good as It Gets	7	2			6	3
2004	Spanglish					1	
Total		25	7	1		18	6

Directed Academy Award performances
Under Brooks' direction, these actors have received Academy Award wins and nominations for their performances in their respective roles.

Year	Performer	Film	Results
Academy Award for Best Actor
1987	William Hurt	Broadcast News	Nominated
1997	Jack Nicholson	As Good as It Gets	Won
Academy Award for Best Actress
1983	Debra Winger	Terms of Endearment	Nominated
1983	Shirley MacLaine	Terms of Endearment	Won
1987	Holly Hunter	Broadcast News	Nominated
1997	Helen Hunt	As Good as It Gets	Won
Academy Award for Best Supporting Actor
1983	Jack Nicholson	Terms of Endearment	Won
1983	John Lithgow	Terms of Endearment	Nominated
1987	Albert Brooks	Broadcast News	Nominated
1997	Greg Kinnear	As Good as It Gets	Nominated
