= Plusaversary =

The Simpsons in Plusaversary
- Promotional image featuring Homer Simpson and Goofy
- Directed by: David Silverman
- Written by: Joel H. Cohen; Jessica Conrad; Al Jean; Loni Steele Sosthand; Dan Vebber
- Based on: The Simpsons by Matt Groening
- Produced by: James L. Brooks; Matt Groening; Al Jean; Matt Selman; Joel H. Cohen; Richard Sakai; Denise Sirkot; Richard Raynis
- Starring: Dan Castellaneta; Nancy Cartwright; Yeardley Smith; Hank Azaria; Tress MacNeille
- Edited by: Taylor Allen
- Music by: Bleeding Fingers Music
- Production companies: Gracie Films; 20th Television Animation
- Distributed by: Disney+ (Disney Platform Distribution)
- Release date: November 12, 2021
- Running time: 4 minutes
- Country: United States
- Language: English

The Simpsons in Plusaversary, or simply Plusaversary, is an American animated short film based on the television series The Simpsons produced by Gracie Films and 20th Television Animation, debuting on streaming service Disney+'s 2nd anniversary in 2021. It is the fifth short film in The Simpsons franchise, and the third promotional short produced for Disney+. The short was directed by David Silverman and released on November 12, 2021 – Disney+ Day. In the short film, there is a Disney+ party at Moe's Tavern and everyone is invited except Homer.

== Plot ==
Several Disney, Pixar, Marvel, Star Wars, and Simpsons characters are lined up to enter Moe's Tavern, where Maleficent is checking the guest list to enter, and Homer is complaining that he is not on the list. However, when Goofy appears, he forces him to be his +1.

At the Tavern, Darth Vader is drinking a beer, Doctor Strange is playing pool along with Carl and Lenny, Homer and Goofy are drinking beers, Elsa is creating some ice in a bucket that a Fantasia's broom is filling with beer, while Buzz Lightyear and The Mandalorian are having an arm wrestling contest, that Buzz loses, and Moe thinks that Donald Duck is choking, so Barney tries to do a Heimlich maneuver on him.

At the table, Homer and Goofy are discussing, while Happy is complaining how the party stinks before complaining to Grumpy, and they get divided by Lisa who comes to the Tavern to collect Homer, who gets his beer struck by BB-8. Lisa then cheers the place up with a song about Disney+.

After the song, Mickey Mouse's shadow appears over the door to the Tavern, overjoying everyone as the boss is arriving, but Bart appears instead, dressed as Mickey, telling them to get back to work, and dragging Goofy away, while Barney drags Homer the other way.

== Cast and characters ==
- Dan Castellaneta as Homer Simpson, Donald Duck, Barney Gumble, Sideshow Mel, Happy, Grumpy and Winnie the Pooh
- Nancy Cartwright as Bart Simpson and Maggie Simpson
- Yeardley Smith as Lisa Simpson
- Hank Azaria as Moe Szyslak, Goofy, Horatio McCallister and Buzz Lightyear
- Tress MacNeille as Maleficent

=== Cameo appearances ===
Plusaversary includes a number of non-vocal cameo appearances from various Disney properties.

Additionally Disney characters, Baymax, Beast, a Broomstick, Cobra Bubbles, Cinderella, Heihei, Clarabelle Cow, Ferdinand, Jiminy Cricket, Cruella de Vil, Elsa, Gaston, Hades, Pinocchio, Captain Hook, Jafar, Lady, Maui, Mowgli, Mulan, Olaf, Wreck-It Ralph, Scar, Sebastian, Snow White, Tiana, Tinker Bell, Tramp, the White Rabbit and the One Hundred and One Dalmatians make an appearance.

Ant-Man, Loki and Doctor Strange appear from the Marvel Cinematic Universe. The Pixar characters – Bao, Joe Gardner, Hamm, Jessie, Miguel Rivera, Sulley, WALL-E and Woody also appear. Star Wars characters – BB-8, Lando Calrissian, Darth Vader, The Mandalorian, Max Rebo, Ahsoka Tano and multiple Stormtroopers make an appearance.

== Reception ==
Rich Knight of CinemaBlend ranked The Simpsons in Plusaversary first in their top of The Simpsons Disney+ shorts, stated it manages to be the best short film from the franchise, praised the humor and the gags, and complimented the film for satirizing Disney and its characters. Mike Celestino of LaughingPlace.com gave a positive review, writing, "The Simpson clan has been part of the Disney family for about two and a half years now, and it's good to see the powers that be at the House of Mouse letting them run amok with familiar characters like this. And as a franchise, The Simpsons has become something of an in-house court jester for The Walt Disney Company, skewering their otherwise straightforward takes on treasured properties like Marvel and Star Wars".

John Schwarz of Bubbleblabber gave Plusaversary a five out of ten stating "Personally, I think Family Guy and South Park over the years has beaten The Simpsons to this punch on a number of different and much funnier occasions. While the other shorts did a better job of really showcasing The Simpsons' writers influence on Disney characters, this one seemed the most hands-off because, as we know, Disney seldom understands comedy."

Luke Savage of Jacobin wrote a scathing review in which he attributed the short to a mass media landscape in which a small number of conglomerates controlled the majority of content. He disapproved of having Lisa Simpson sing a song endorsing Disney+. Jeremy Brown of What'sOnDisneyPlus.com gave the short 1.5 out of 5, writing that "This seems to have no real purpose other than trying to shoehorn as many characters into one six-minute short as possible [...] overall this is just kinda dumb. It feels like Disney patting itself on the back for providing the service, but there's no real reason to do that". Jamie Sylvester of Inside the Magic.com was disturbed by the portrayal of Goofy as a drinker complaining about his work, and was thankful that the short was not marketed towards children.
