= May the 12th Be with You =

2024 American animated short film

- Promotional poster
- Directed by: David Silverman
- Written by: Joel H. Cohen; Al Jean; David Mirkin; Jeff Westbrook
- Based on: The Simpsons by Matt Groening
- Production companies: Gracie Films; 20th Television Animation
- Distributed by: Disney+ (Disney Platform Distribution)
- Release date: May 10, 2024
- Running time: 5 minutes
- Country: United States

May the 12th Be with You is an animated short film based on the television series The Simpsons. The short was released on May 10, 2024, on Disney+ in celebration of both Star Wars Day and Mother's Day.

It is the eighth Simpsons Disney+ short film and the third Simpsons short film related to Star Wars after The Force Awakens from Its Nap (2021) and Rogue Not Quite One (2023).

In its first week of release, the short film topped the most watched films on Disney+.

== Plot ==
Marge and other moms and children of Disney+ are getting ready for a Mother's Day outing, get in the car, but Homer hasn't fixed it yet, but the day is saved when Ahsoka Tano comes to the rescue. On Ahsoka's T-6 shuttle, Marge gets sick and opens a window, ejecting BB-8 out of the ship. Right after they arrive at the Disney Playground Planet, the Evil Queen in her witch form informs them they need to go to the Disney Parking Planet first.

On the planet, a battle with lightsabers ensues against Stormtroopers and Maggie and the other kids join too. Marge gets a little too eager to fight when she gets stopped by a stormtrooper saying it's just a simulation and tells others she ruined the simulation. She gets booed and to apologize, she organizes a party at the Simpsons house. At the party, Hulu kids join, and Homer takes Stewie Griffin to Moe's Tavern.

== Cast ==
- Julie Kavner as Marge Simpson
- Dan Castellaneta as Homer Simpson, Grampa Simpson, and Goofy
- Nancy Cartwright as Maggie Simpson and Mickey Mouse
- Tress MacNeille as Bambi's mother, the Evil Queen, and Mrs. Potts
- Carolyn Omine as Nani Pelekai
- Maggie Roswell as Mary Poppins
- Maurice LaMarche as Darth Vader
- Chris Edgerly as Chewbacca and Eeyore
- Seth MacFarlane as Stewie Griffin

== Reception ==
John Schwarz of Bubbleblabber gave May the 12th Be with You an 8.5 out of 10, stating,

The producers for The Simpsons do shorts like this all of the time and I think this one’s by far the best one for two reasons: 1) We get far more talking than the previous shorts 2) It was actually funny! And that last part is the most important because whilst the previous shorts seemed to forget that, even in four minutes, you gotta get a laugh, “May the 12th Be With You” is by far the funniest, gag-filled effort of the bunch and you should definitely add it to your watchlist this weekend.
