= When Billie Met Lisa =

- Directed by: David Silverman
- Written by: Elisabeth Kiernan Averick; Broti Gupta; Al Jean; Cesar Mazariegos; David Mirkin
- Based on: The Simpsons by Matt Groening
- Produced by: James L. Brooks; Matt Groening; Al Jean; Matt Selman; Richard Sakai
- Starring: Nancy Cartwright; Yeardley Smith; Billie Eilish; Finneas O'Connell
- Music by: Bleeding Fingers Music
- Production companies: Gracie Films; 20th Television Animation
- Distributed by: Disney+ (Disney Platform Distribution)
- Release date: April 22, 2022
- Running time: 3 minutes
- Country: United States
- Language: English

When Billie Met Lisa is an animated short film based on the American singer Billie Eilish, produced by Gracie Films and 20th Television Animation, debuting on the streaming service Disney+. It is the sixth short film in The Simpsons franchise, and the fourth promotional short produced for Disney+. Like the previous shorts, it was directed by David Silverman and released on April 22, 2022.

== Plot ==
Lisa is playing her saxophone on the couch, when she receives a message on her phone by Homer to stop playing so he can work in peace. Marge comes in the room to clean up and starts bothering her, cleaning the sax too. Lisa moves to the treehouse, but Bart starts using a chainsaw to bother her too, so she relocates to the music class at the school, where she finds other kids playing. Not finding peace, she relocates under an overpass, where a car stops nearby, and Billie Eilish notices her and invites her to jam at a recording studio owned by Billie, where they play the Simpsons theme and everyone in Springfield appreciates it, while Bart talks about Lisa with Billie's brother, Finneas O'Connell. In the end they end up stargazing above the car where they discuss her family appreciating her music.

== Cast ==
- Nancy Cartwright as Bart Simpson, Maggie Simpson
- Yeardley Smith as Lisa Simpson
- Billie Eilish as Herself
- Finneas O'Connell as Himself
- Chris Edgerly and Sunkrish Bala as band members

== Production ==
Producer James L. Brooks came up with the idea of making a film with Billie Eilish during a conversation with Al Jean. They worked with Disney+ to arrange it, as they had already collaborated with Eilish on Happier Than Ever: A Love Letter to Los Angeles.

== Release ==
When Billie Met Lisa was released on Disney+ on April 22, 2022.

== Reception ==
Rich Knight of CinemaBlend ranked When Billie Met Lisa fourth in their top of The Simpsons shorts, praised the humor of the short film, and complimented the references to Billie Eilish and her work. Paul Bradshaw of NME found agreeable that the short film provides gags centered on Eilish and O'Connell, praised the new record of The Simpsons Theme, and complimented the end credits for its humor. Mike Celestino of LaughingPlace.com gave a positive review, writing, "On the whole, When Billie Met Lisa makes for a fun diversion that is sure to delight crossover fans of The Simpsons and Eilish, though a few of the jokes do fall flat here and there, and like the other above-mentioned shorts it goes by very quickly."

John Schwarz of Bubbleblabber gave When Billie Met Lisa an eight out of ten stating "A few solid jokes jab in before the climax make this a delicious morsel of a snack though I do hope that Billie comes back in the future because it seems the gag department had a bunch of early fun with her that I think can be more fully fleshed out across 22-minutes."

Stacey Henley of TheGamer complimented the humor of When Billie Met Lisa across its gags, acknowledged the references of Eilish and her work, but stated that the short film should have provided a full story and more screen time for Eilish and O'Connell. Jeremy Brown of What'sOnDisneyPlus.com gave the short 2 out of 5, writing, "I'm just not sure what the point of this was other than to put Billie Eilish in a The Simpsons short. It's all technically well done. The animation is beautiful. The voice acting is wonderful. Objectively, there's nothing wrong with it, but, subjectively, I still don't get why it needed to be done."

The short was nominated for an Primetime Emmy Award for Outstanding Short Form Animated Program at the Primetime Emmy Awards.

The episode provoked some controversy with Simpsons fans online after its release, due to the ending scene with Lisa saying that Homer never supported her, due to the continuity issues of previous episodes in which Homer was supportive, such as "Lisa's Sax".
