= The Simpsons Balenciaga =

2021 animated Simpsons fashion film

The Simpsons | Balenciaga
- Directed by: David Silverman
- Written by: Joel H. Cohen; Al Jean; Michael Price
- Based on: The Simpsons by Matt Groening
- Produced by: James L. Brooks; Matt Groening; Al Jean; Richard Raynis; Denise Sirkot
- Starring: Dan Castellaneta; Julie Kavner; Nancy Cartwright; Yeardley Smith; Harry Shearer; Hank Azaria
- Music by: Bleeding Fingers Music
- Production companies: Gracie Films; 20th Television Animation
- Release dates: October 2, 2021; (Paris and YouTube)
- Running time: 10 minutes
- Languages: English; French

The Simpsons | Balenciaga (Note: The film has no official title, and is sometimes referred to as "The Simpsons | Balenciaga" or "The Simpsons × Balenciaga".) is a 2021 animated short film based on the television series The Simpsons. The production staff of The Simpsons collaborated with French/Spanish luxury fashion house Balenciaga to produce the film that premiered on October 2, 2021 during Paris Fashion Week. The ten-minute film, directed by David Silverman, parodies the fashion industry and highlights Balenciaga's recent clothing.

== Plot ==
Homer forgets to buy Marge a birthday present, and while looking for ideas finds her sleeping with a Balenciaga catalog and writes to them, asking if they can send him their cheapest product with the Balenciaga logo on it, or even just a tag. Balenciaga responds by sending him the dress on the cover of the catalog. On Marge's birthday, she is thrilled by the dress, but Homer finds out it costs €19,000. Homer and Marge go out for the evening, and Homer tries to stop anything from staining the dress so he can return it. Marge returns the dress with a note saying she will always remember "those 30 minutes of feeling just a little special."

Demna Gvasalia, the creative director of Balenciaga, receives the dress, and after reading Marge's note decides to go to Springfield where, after finding the town "style-deprived", tells the townspeople he will fly them to Paris to model Balenciaga's clothing during Paris Fashion Week. (Note: The Simpson family previously visited Paris during Fashion Week in "To Courier with Love".) In Paris, the show starts with everyone modeling different outfits. The spectators express disapproval at first, but change their tune after Anna Wintour says she enjoys the models. Bart moons the crowd, who are unoffended and moon him back. Lisa is reluctant to model, but decides to participate as "research" and enjoys it. The designers struggle to get Homer into his outfit before they send him onto the catwalk. Marge models a bowed ballgown in the finale of the show, where she is cheered. Following the show, the Springfield townspeople take a boat ride down the Seine and Homer sings "La Mer" to Marge. Homer's clothing catches fire from a cigar and Gvasalia tries to put it out with an expensive bottle of champagne. The fire is put out by covering him with a Balenciaga sheet.

== Cast and characters ==
- Dan Castellaneta as Homer Simpson / Barney Gumble
- Julie Kavner as Marge Simpson
- Nancy Cartwright as Bart Simpson
- Yeardley Smith as Lisa Simpson
- Harry Shearer as Waylon Smithers
- Hank Azaria as Moe Szyslak / Comic Book Guy
- Chris Edgerly as Demna Gvasalia
- Tress MacNeille as Anna Wintour

Patty and Selma, Sideshow Mel, Sideshow Bob, Groundskeeper Willie, Chief Wiggum, Julio, Agnes Skinner, Sherri and Terri, and Maggie Simpson also appear as non-speaking models.

== Production ==
After Demna Gvasalia, a longtime fan of The Simpsons, presented the idea to the show's creator Matt Groening in April 2020, the short film was produced in secret for almost a year. The original outline from the Simpsons writers had Balenciaga holding their fashion show in Springfield, but the location was changed to Paris at Balenciaga's insistence. All of the clothing featured in the short are designs by Balenciaga, with the exception of the fictional dress Marge receives at the beginning. Though Gvasalia was heavily involved with the production, he declined to voice himself. Anna Wintour approved of her likeness being used but declined to voice herself. Director David Silverman said animating the distinct look and movement of fabrics was particularly challenging.

== Release ==
The film premiered at Balenciaga's "Red Carpet Collection" event for their spring 2022 fashion line at the Théâtre du Châtelet during Paris Fashion Week on October 2, 2021. The film was used in place of a traditional catwalk presentation of their clothing, and received a standing ovation. Balenciaga posted the film on their YouTube channel the same day, where it received over five million views in its first week. Balenciaga also released a tie-in Simpsons clothing collection.

== Links ==
- The Simpsons | Balenciaga on YouTube
- The Simpsons | Balenciaga at IMDb
