= The Simpsons Meet the Bocellis in "Feliz Navidad" =

2022 animated short film

- Promotional poster
- Directed by: David Silverman
- Written by: Joel H. Cohen; Al Jean; Ryan Koh; David Mirkin
- Based on: The Simpsons by Matt Groening
- Production companies: Gracie Films; 20th Television Animation
- Distributed by: Disney+ (Disney Platform Distribution)
- Release date: December 15, 2022
- Running time: 3 minutes
- Country: United States
- Languages: English; Italian; Spanish

The Simpsons Meet the Bocellis in "Feliz Navidad" is an American animated short film based on the television series The Simpsons produced by Gracie Films and 20th Television Animation, debuting on the streaming service Disney+ on December 15, 2022. Like the previous Simpsons shorts, it was directed by David Silverman.

== Plot ==
On Christmas, Bart, Lisa, and Maggie rush downstairs to open their presents. Homer stops them to let Marge go first and reveals that Italian tenor Andrea Bocelli is hiding behind the tree. Marge and Lisa are excited to see him whilst Bart doesn't care and just wants to open his presents. As Bocelli starts to sing "Con te partirò", Bart gets into the music and sings along with Bocelli. After they stop, Homer asks Andrea for a Christmas song. Andrea turns to his children Matteo and Virginia for help. Virginia suggests that they sing "Feliz Navidad", and the three of them sing it to the Simpsons, with the Simpsons joining in.

Across town, Chief Wiggum uses the electric chair on a turkey, which Snake Jailbird carves. Ralph Wiggum is dressed as the Easter bunny and tries to put an egg in his basket, which has a hole in. Itchy in "Steamboat Itchy" is seen in a Santa hat, Cletus Spuckler and Brandine Spuckler put up Christmas stockings for their children, and Groundskeeper Willie gives Sideshow Bob a rake, which he then steps on. During the song, Bart unwraps his bike and cycles off across the Mickey Mouse icon, much to his annoyance.

== Production ==
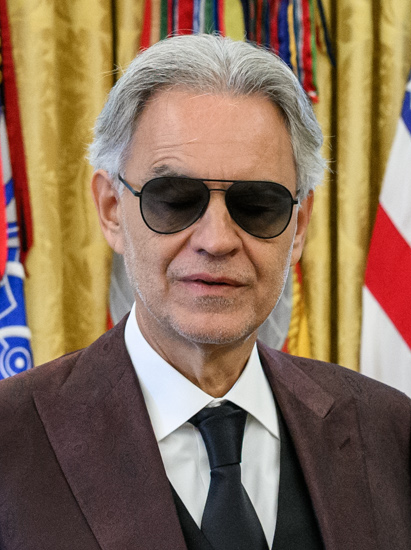
Andrea Bocelli himself suggested the idea of appearing on The Simpsons, requesting that his children could, as well.

The Simpsons Meet the Bocellis in "Feliz Navidad" was first announced on December 7, 2022, and was to be the sixth of the series' exclusive Disney+ shorts. Alongside the announcement came a poster and a release date of December 15. It starred opera singer Andrea Bocelli, alongside his son Matteo and daughter Virginia.

According to showrunner Al Jean, Andrea Bocelli was the one to reach out to the Simpsons staff, requesting a cameo appearance on the series, also asking for his children to be able to star alongside him. While pitching the idea, he also came up with the narrative of the episode revolving around Homer gifting a song from Bocelli and his family to Marge for Christmas. Jean stated that he was surprised at how well Nancy Cartwright was able to sing near the end of the episode's musical sequence, also asserting that the song stayed with him for several days after recording.

== Cast ==
- Dan Castellaneta as Homer Simpson, Santa's Little Helper
- Julie Kavner as Marge Simpson
- Nancy Cartwright as Bart Simpson, Maggie Simpson, Mickey Mouse
- Yeardley Smith as Lisa Simpson
- Andrea Bocelli as himself
- Matteo Bocelli as himself
- Virginia Bocelli as herself

== Reception ==
John Schwarz of Bubbleblabber gave the film a nine out of ten, stating: "With barely enough time for a proper joke setup, the latest short from The Simpsons is probably the most innocent of the bunch yet. Still very much a commercial for the longest running animated series in primetime with the added bonus of the Bocellis getting a music video produced by David Silverman and the best animation producers in the business."

Mike Celestino of LaughingPlace.com gave a positive review, stating: "Overall it's a very nice, if somewhat slight, holiday treat from 'Our Favorite Family,' the Bocellis, and the citizens of Springfield for Disney+ viewers to enjoy this Christmas."

== See also ==
- A Family Christmas - the album on which the song released
