= Star Wars Day =

Informal commemorative holiday on May 4

- Lucasfilm's official marketing logo
- Observed by: Star Wars fans
- Type: Secular
- Significance: Celebrating Star Wars
- Date: May 4
- Next time: May 4, 2027
- Frequency: Annual
- First time: 2011
- Related to: Geek Pride Day

Star Wars Day is an informal commemorative day observed annually on May 4 to celebrate the Star Wars media franchise created by filmmaker George Lucas. Observance of the day has spread quickly through media and grassroots celebrations since the franchise began in 1977.

The date originated from the pun "May the Fourth be with you", from the Star Wars catchphrase "May the Force be with you." Even though the holiday was not created or declared by Lucasfilm, many Star Wars fans have chosen to celebrate it. It has since been embraced by Lucasfilm and the Walt Disney Company as an annual celebration of Star Wars.

The release date of the original Star Wars movie, May 25, 1977, is celebrated by some as Geek Pride Day.

== History ==
The first recorded reference of the phrase being used to refer to the date was on Thursday May 3, 1979, the day of the 1979 United Kingdom general election, in which Margaret Thatcher was elected Prime Minister of the United Kingdom. To express their support before the votes were counted, her political party, the Conservatives, purchased a half-page advertisement on page 13 of the London Evening News reading "Dear Maggie, May the Fourth Be with You. Your Party Workers."

In a 1988 episode of Count Duckula, "The Vampire Strikes Back", a space-faring superhero, Tremendous Terrance, asks Duckula the date and is told, "May the Fourth". As Terrance departs, he tells all below, "May the Fourth be with you."

The phrase was used in a UK Parliament defence debate on May 4, 1994.

Astrophysicist and author Jeanne Cavelos used the saying on page 94 of her 1999 book The Science of Star Wars.

In 2008, the first Facebook groups appeared, celebrating Luke Skywalker Day, with the same catchphrase.

In 2011, the first organized celebration of Star Wars Day took place in Toronto, Ontario, Canada, at the Toronto Underground Cinema. Produced by Sean Ward and Alice Quinn, festivities included an original trilogy trivia game show; a costume contest with celebrity judges; and the web's best tribute films, mash-ups, parodies, and remixes on the big screen. The second annual edition took place on Friday, May 4, 2012.

Fans (including government officials, such as Boris Johnson) have celebrated Star Wars in a variety of ways in social media and on television.

Major League Baseball, association football, and college sports teams have paid tribute to Star Wars in different ways. Minor League Baseball teams such as the Toledo Mud Hens and the Durham Bulls have worn special uniforms as part of Star Wars Day promotions.

On Star Wars Day 2015, astronauts in the International Space Station watched Star Wars. Also in 2015, the carillon bells inside the Peace Tower on Parliament Hill in Ottawa, Canada, played "The Imperial March" theme from Star Wars, among other space-related tunes.

In June 2021, it was announced that Carrie Fisher would receive a star on the Hollywood Walk of Fame in 2022. She received the star on Star Wars Day, May 4, 2023.

== Disney ==
Since 2013, The Walt Disney Company has officially observed the holiday with several Star Wars events and festivities at Disneyland and Walt Disney World. Disney had purchased Lucasfilm, including the rights to Star Wars, in late 2012.

The finale of The Clone Wars was made available on Disney+ on May 4, 2020. Star Wars: The Rise of Skywalker, as well as the documentary series Disney Gallery: The Mandalorian, were also made available on Disney+ the same day. On Star Wars Day 2021, the animated series Star Wars: The Bad Batch also premiered on Disney+, along with the short film Maggie Simpson in "The Force Awakens from Its Nap". The second trailer for Obi-Wan Kenobi was released on May 4, 2022, as well as Disney Gallery: The Book of Boba Fett. The second volume of Star Wars: Visions, the short film Maggie Simpson in "Rogue Not Quite One", and Star Wars: Young Jedi Adventures were all released May 4, 2023, on Disney+. On May 10, 2024, a Simpsons short film "May the 12th Be with You" released to Disney+, the title being a wordplay on "May the Fourth be with you" by changing the Fourth to the Twelfth, corresponding with Mother's Day. The short film was made as a celebration of both Star Wars Day and Mother's Day.

The second installment of Star Wars: Tales, titled Tales of the Empire, premiered on May 4, 2024. Its follow-up, Tales from the Underworld, arrived exactly a year later in 2025. In 2026, Disney announced that the final two episodes of Star Wars: Maul – Shadow Lord would air on May the fourth.

== Additional dates ==
=== Revenge of the Fifth/Sixth ===
Some recognize the day after, May 5, as "Revenge of the Fifth", a play on Star Wars: Episode III – Revenge of the Sith, and celebrate the Sith Lords and other villainous characters from the Star Wars series rather than the Jedi. Others celebrate this one day later, on May 6, citing "Revenge of the Sixth" as a better pun on "Sith". The 6th of May is also commonly known as "Return of the 6th" as a play on Return of the Jedi and the trilogy aspect of the Star Wars films.

=== May 25 ===
In honor of the 30th anniversary of the release date of Star Wars on May 25, 1977, the Los Angeles City Council declared May 25, 2007, as Star Wars Day. A separate initiative for observing Geek Pride Day on May 25 is based on the Star Wars connection along with ties to The Hitchhiker's Guide to the Galaxy (Towel Day) and Discworld. Solo: A Star Wars Story was also released on May 25, 2018, 41 years after the original Star Wars.

== See also ==
- Cinco de Mayo, a celebration held on May 5
- Star Trek Day, held on September 8, marking the premiere of the original Star Trek television series
- Mario Day, another unofficial holiday chosen because the date (Mar. 10) visually resembles the name “Mario.”
- Free Comic Book Day, which occasionally falls on May 4
- Geek Pride Day, held on May 25, the release date of the first Star Wars movie
