= The Force Awakens from Its Nap =

- Disney+ promotional poster
- Directed by: David Silverman
- Written by: Joel H. Cohen; Al Jean; Michael Price
- Based on: The Simpsons by Matt Groening
- Produced by: James L. Brooks; Matt Groening; Al Jean; Richard Raynis; Richard Sakai; Matt Selman; Denise Sirkot
- Production companies: Gracie Films; 20th Television
- Distributed by: Disney+ (Disney Platform Distribution)
- Release date: May 4, 2021
- Running time: 3 minutes
- Country: United States

Maggie Simpson in "The Force Awakens from Its Nap" is an animated short film based on the television series The Simpsons. The short was released on May 4, 2021, on Disney+ in celebration of Star Wars Day.

It is the third short film featuring Maggie Simpson, following The Longest Daycare (2012) and Playdate with Destiny (2020). It is the first Simpsons short film related to Star Wars, followed by Rogue Not Quite One (2023; also featuring Maggie Simpson) and May the 12th Be with You (2024). The promotional short is the first of several from The Simpsons that Disney+ has released since 2021, to tie in with the service's marquee brands and titles.

== Plot ==
Marge drives Maggie to The Ayn Rand School for Tots daycare, but Maggie refuses, so Marge takes her to the Jabba's Hut Jedi Preschool, entering through the Sky toddlers door. In there, they see a Jedi prepare sandwiches with the use of a lightsaber and the force, while Ahsoka Tano puts a baby in carbonite for being bad.

Marge takes her to General Grievous that was changing a kid's diaper next to R2-D2, using it as a trash bin. The cyborg takes the pacifier and throws it away. Maggie panics and is approached by BB-8, which wants to help her retrieve the pacifier, so Maggie gives it her bow tie.

BB-8 starts running toward the next room but finds itself trapped in the middle of many other BB-8s. Maggie tries to reach it but the other BB-8s attack and damage it. BB-8 manages to find and give Maggie the pacifier before Baby Gerald, dressed as Darth Maul, stabs it in the back.

Maggie and Gerald start fighting, Maggie using a prolonged pacifier, and when she reaches a "new improved Death Star guaranteed unexplodable" she hits it, making it explode on Gerald. However, he is not stopped and makes her lose the pacifier. Maggie retrieves it and makes him lose his diaper.

Gerald uses the Force to crush her under a wardrobe. BB-8, still alive, arrives at the scene, and Maggie emerges from the wardrobe, alive, with Yoda ears. BB-8 wonders how she's alive and she shows it how in the Star Wars rules, beloved characters never really die. In the end, Maggie and a restored BB-8 watch the twin suns of Tatooine set.

== Production ==
The idea behind a Star Wars short starring Maggie Simpson came up in January 2021. As The Simpsons library of Disney+ was well received, executive producer James L. Brooks proposed to do a series of shorts where the show interacted with other franchises available in the streaming service. Showrunner Al Jean, a long-time Star Wars fan, pitched the idea of making a Star Wars-centric short in which Maggie is sent to a Jedi preschool. Two shorts starring Maggie, The Longest Daycare and Playdate with Destiny, had been previously produced in 2012 and 2020, respectively. Both Lucasfilm and Disney+ showed enthusiasm for the idea, and asked the Simpsons crew to have the short ready for May 4, 2021, given how "Star Wars Day" is celebrated on that date.

Jean wrote the script along with Joel Cohen and Mike Price and the Simpsons director David Silverman directed the short. The first draft for the short was ready by January 18. They worked closely with Lucasfilm throughout the short's development, providing suggestions and making sure that the Simpsons crew used the full universe of their characters. Among the characters included in the short was a "Darth Maul Baby" and BB-8, but Grogu (better known as "Baby Yoda") was only referenced yet not included, as Jean felt that the character is probably the most sought-after of Disney, so they did not want him to be overexposed. The Lucasfilm team also helped them to transliterate the chalkboard writing to Aurebesh. The short was finished on April 30, four days before its release date.

== Reception ==
=== Critical reception ===
Rich Knight of CinemaBlend ranked Maggie Simpson in "The Force Awakens from Its Nap" third in their top of The Simpsons Short, acknowledged the references to the Star Wars franchise, and praised the humor and the gags of the animated short film, despite stating that The Force Awakens from Its Nap does not offer much of a story. Eden Arnold of Bleeding Cool found the short film to be an endearing celebration of Star Wars Day, while saying it shows off Disney's properties. Raul Velasquez of TheGamer.com complimented the humor of the short film, stating it manages to be a cheerful and carefree short that is funny enough to entertain Star Wars fans, and claimed that the crossover manages to capture the humor of The Simpsons franchise at the same time.

=== Accolades ===
Year	Award	Category	Nominee(s)	Result	Ref.
2021	Primetime Emmy Awards	Outstanding Short Form Animated Program	James L. Brooks, Matt Groening, Matt Selman, Richard Sakai, Denise Sirkot, Richard Raynis, Tom Klein, Joel H. Cohen, Al Jean, Michael Price, David Silverman, Acacia Caputo, K.C. Johnson and Mike Frank Polcino	Nominated	
2021	Online Film & Television Association	Best Animated Program	The Force Awakens from Its Nap	Nominated	

== Followups ==
In 2023, another short film was released with Maggie Simpson celebrating Star Wars Day called Rogue Not Quite One.
