= Rogue Not Quite One =

2023 American animated short film

- Poster of the film
- Directed by: David Silverman
- Written by: Al Jean; Ryan Koh; Loni Steele Sosthand; Dan Vebber; Jeff Westbrook
- Based on: The Simpsons by Matt Groening
- Production companies: Gracie Films; 20th Television Animation
- Distributed by: Disney+ (Disney Platform Distribution)
- Release date: May 4, 2023
- Running time: 4 minutes
- Country: United States

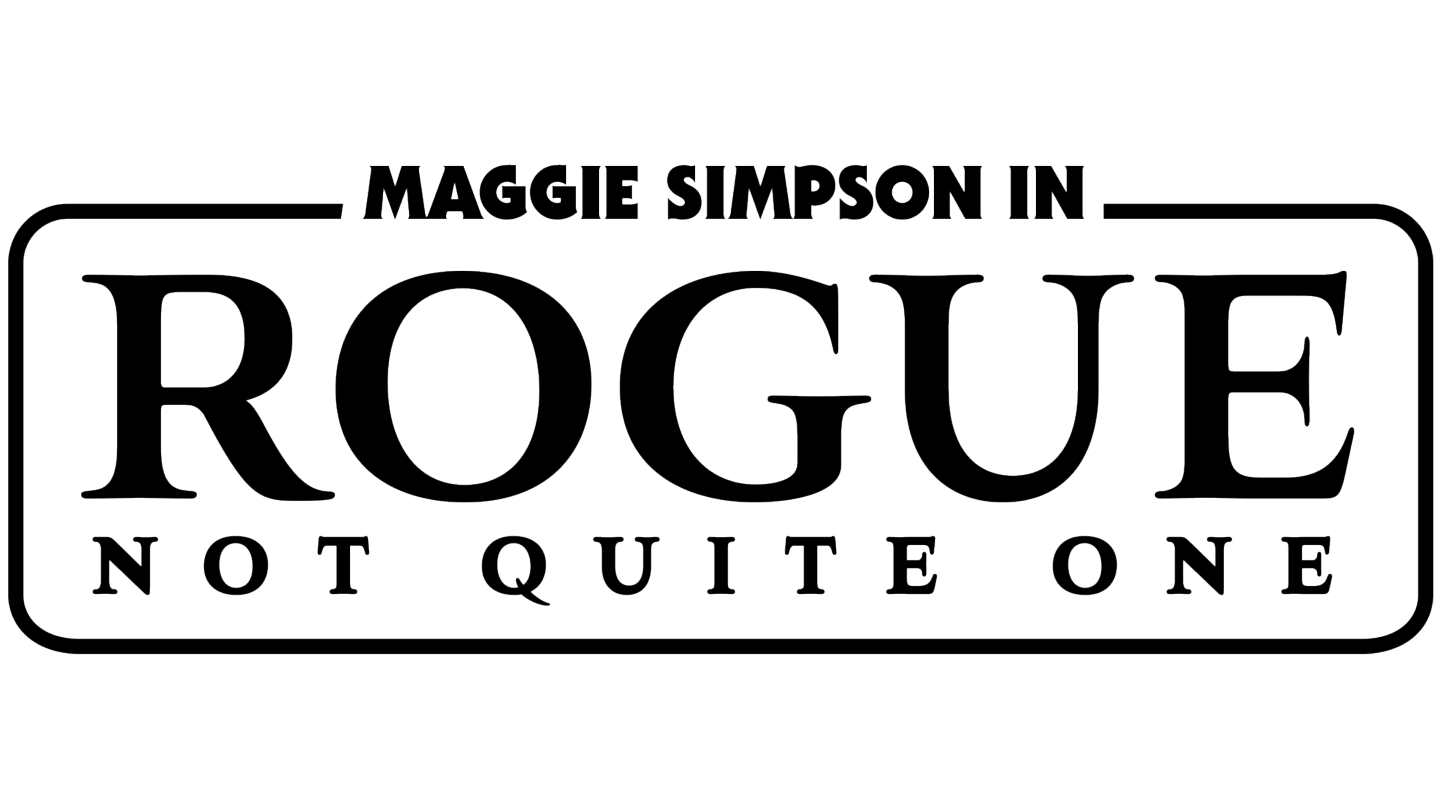
Logo of the film in black

Maggie Simpson in "Rogue Not Quite One", also known as Rogue Not Quite One, is an animated short film based on the television series The Simpsons. The short was released on May 4, 2023, on Disney+ in celebration of Star Wars Day and Disney's 100th anniversary. On May 2, this short was announced alongside the promotional poster. The film's title references the 2016 film Rogue One: A Star Wars Story.

It is the fourth short film featuring Maggie Simpson, following The Longest Daycare (2012), Playdate with Destiny (2020), and The Force Awakens from Its Nap (2021), as well as the seventh Disney+ short film. It is also the second Simpsons short film related to Star Wars after The Force Awakens from Its Nap (2021), followed by May the 12th Be with You (2024).

== Plot ==
The Mandalorian approaches a Stormtrooper who tells him to not bring weapons, outside food, strollers, or discounts at the Mom Mothma and Me area. High Mando places his pistol and a donut on Grogu's pram. Homer Simpson approaches the Stormtrooper but sees Chewbacca guarding Moe's Cantina, so he places his baby Maggie on Grogu's pram just as Homer enters the Cantina and approaches Moe who serves him a drink but encounters a customer who swallows him while Maggie stares at the Cantina. Just as Maggie sees a control panel on the pram, she then notices a sign on the pram reading "Baby Yodas only" which Mando approaches Maggie and arms himself with the Darksaber and attempts to get Maggie out of Grogu's pram only to note that the pram launches itself into the air, just as Maggie finds herself in Springfield. Suddenly, Chief Wiggum and his assistant Lou approach Maggie on Grogu's pram just as the police chase them across the street whom Wiggum mistakes the pram for a donut only for Maggie to end up in the Springfield Elementary School. However, Maggie presses the hyperdrive on the pram just as the pram speeds into Outer Space. Baby Gerald in a Darth Maul costume attacks Maggie only for Gerald to see the words "Nap time" and "No excuses" on the signs, causing him to cancel his attack and fall asleep.

Back at Moe's Cantina, the green alien spits out Homer which Homer hi-fives it only for Homer to encounter the Mandalorian who tells him to know where Grogu's pram is. Homer uses the "Find My Baby" app to find Maggie which Homer finds out that his baby is in the Galactic Core, which Homer reads over the complicated directions of out to get there. The opening crawl from the Star Wars franchise plays only for the credits to be disrupted as Maggie flies past the texts where Baby Gerald plans to go after Maggie, sending an entire fleet of TIE Fighters which form the words "Bye Bye Baby!" just before Maggie presses the hyperdrive button to return to Earth while Maggie is chased by the fleet attempting to shoot her down where she passes by Homer and Mando. Throughout the chase, two TIE Fighters crash into the Lard Lad Donuts sign, followed by a Blinky devouring another one. The rest of the TIE Fighters surround Maggie and attempt to shoot her down only for Kang and Kodos on their UFO to arrive, blasting away the entire fleet to save Maggie. However, Gerald attacks Maggie, causing damage on Grogu's pram which Maggie fires Mando's grappling hook onto the TIE Fighter as Maggie tosses her pacifier into Gerald's mouth, as he transforms from his Darth Maul alter ego to his human self, causing him to leave in despair. As Maggie feels sad that she lost her pacifier, BB-8 pops up next to her and gives her a replacement of her pacifier just as Maggie and BB-8 set off into the sky as she flies off into space with BB-8.

== Cast ==
- Hank Azaria as Chief Wiggum
- Chris Edgerly
- Dawnn Lewis as TIE Interceptor System

== Reception ==
John Schwarz of Bubbleblabber gave Rogue Not Quite One an eight out of ten, stating: "This short from The Simpsons has everything you want, even some poking satire at the head studios on lack of real estate on the streamer. The action sequences were out-of-control, and Maggie is cute-as-the-dickens."

Mike Celestino of LaughingPlace.com stated "Maggie Simpson in Rogue Not Quite One is about on par with The Simpsons’ Disney+ shorts, though Star Wars fans who appreciate the franchise (and its current parent company Disney) being poked fun at will probably be the ones to appreciate it the most. There are some good chuckles to be had here, and the short's extremely... well, short... running time means it doesn't take too much of a commitment to get through it. Like 2021's Maggie Simpson in The Force Awakens from Its Nap before it, it's a fitting, funny tribute from Our Favorite Family to our favorite space opera saga."
