= Richard Sakai =

American television and film producer (born 1954)

- Born: January 28, 1954 (age 72); San Francisco, California, U.S.
- Occupations: Producer; director
- Writing career
- Genres: Situation comedy; romantic comedy

Richard Sakai (born January 28, 1954) is an American television and film producer. He is best known for his work on the animated sitcom The Simpsons, for which he is one of the original producers. In 1997, Sakai was nominated for an Academy Award for Best Picture for his work on the film Jerry Maguire (1996).

== Career ==
Sakai began his career as an assistant to James L. Brooks in 1977. In 1984, Brooks invited Sakai to become a producer in his new film production company, Gracie Films. Sakai ultimately produced many of Brooks' films, such as Jerry Maguire, As Good as It Gets (1997), and Spanglish (2004). Sakai also produced Bottle Rocket (1996) and Riding in Cars with Boys (2001). Additionally, he was a producer for The Simpsons Movie (2007).

As a television producer and director, Sakai has worked on many different shows. He has directed episodes of Taxi, Newhart, and Who's the Boss?. He has also produced episodes of The Tracey Ullman Show, The Critic, Phenom, and What About Joan? in addition to his work on The Simpsons, for which he has won several Emmy Awards.

On The Simpsons, Sakai has been animated several times, most notably as: a karaoke singer in the episode "One Fish, Two Fish, Blowfish, Blue Fish"; an escaping prisoner in a commercial about "revolving door prisons" in "Sideshow Bob Roberts"; and a jazz vibraphone player in "Jazzy and the Pussycats".

Sakai is currently president of Gracie Films.
