= List of awards and nominations received by The Tracey Ullman Show =

The following is a list of awards and nominations received by the Fox sketch comedy variety series The Tracey Ullman Show. The series received a total of 33 Primetime Emmy Awards nominations, winning 10, a Golden Globe, and others.

== Awards and nominations ==
=== American Comedy Awards ===
| Year | Category | Nominee | Result |
|---|---|---|---|
| 1988 | Funniest Female Performer in a TV Series (Leading Role) Network, Cable or Syndication | Tracey Ullman | Won |
| 1989 | Funniest Female Performer in a TV Special (Leading or Supporting) Network, Cable or Syndication | Tracey Ullman | Won |
| 1990 | Funniest Supporting Female Performer in a TV Series | Julie Kavner | Won |
| 1990 | Funniest Female Performer in a TV Series (Leading Role) Network, Cable or Syndication | Tracey Ullman | Won |
| 1991 | Funniest Female Performer in a TV Series (Leading Role) Network, Cable or Syndication | Tracey Ullman | Won |

=== GLAAD Media Awards ===
| Year | Category | Nominee | Result |
|---|---|---|---|
| 1990 | Outstanding Comedy Episode | | Won |

=== Golden Globe Awards ===
| Year | Category | Nominee | Result |
|---|---|---|---|
| 1988 | Best Performance by an Actress in a Television Series – Comedy or Musical | Tracey Ullman | Won |
| 1989 | Best Performance by an Actress in a Television Series – Comedy or Musical | Tracey Ullman | Nominated |
| 1990 | Best Performance by an Actress in a Television Series – Comedy or Musical | Tracey Ullman | Nominated |

=== Primetime Emmy Awards ===
| Year | Category | Nominee(s) | Episodes(s) | Result |
|---|---|---|---|---|
| 1987 | Outstanding Writing in a Variety or Music Program | James L. Brooks, Jerry Belson, Heide Perlman, Ken Estin, Paul Flaherty, Dick Blasucci, Sue Herring, Matt Groening, Kim Fuller, Sam Simon, Marc Flanagan | For "The Lottery", "Girl on a Ledge" and "Ambulance Pick Up" | Nominated |
| 1987 | Outstanding Variety, Music or Comedy Program | James L. Brooks (executive producer), Jerry Belson (executive producer), Ken Estin (executive producer), Heide Perlman (executive producer), Richard Sakai (producer), Paul Flaherty (co-producer), Dick Blasucci (co-producer), Tracey Ullman (host) | | Nominated |
| 1987 | Outstanding Individual Performance in a Variety or Music Program | Julie Kavner | | Nominated |
| 1987 | Outstanding Directing in a Variety or Music Program | Ted Bessell, Stuart Margolin | For "Meg and Tina in August", "Pre-School" and "Golf" | Nominated |
| 1987 | Outstanding Makeup for a Series | Thomas R. Burman (special makeup), Bari Dreiband-Burman (makeup) | For "The Makeover" | Nominated |
| 1988 | Outstanding Writing in a Variety or Music Program | James L. Brooks, Heide Perlman, Jerry Belson, Ken Estin, Sam Simon, Marc Flanagan, Matt Groening, Wallace Wolodarsky, Jay Kogen, Dick Blasucci, Tracey Ullman | For "Ginny Redux", "Fear" and "Real Lace" | Nominated |
| 1988 | Outstanding Variety, Music or Comedy Program | James L. Brooks (executive producer), Heide Perlman (executive producer), Jerry Belson (executive producer), Ken Estin (executive producer), Richard Sakai (producer), Ted Bessell (producer), Marc Flanagan (co-producer), Tracey Ullman (host), Dick Blasucci (co-producer) | | Nominated |
| 1988 | Outstanding Individual Performance in a Variety or Music Program | Julie Kavner | For "Drugs and Guns" | Nominated |
| 1988 | Outstanding Editing for a Series – Multi-Camera Production | M. Pam Blumenthal (editor), Douglas Hines (editor) | For "Ginny Redux", "Fear" and "Real Lace" | Nominated |
| 1988 | Outstanding Achievement in Choreography | Paula Abdul (choreographer) | For "The Pits" | Nominated |
| 1989 | Outstanding Writing in a Variety or Music Program | James L. Brooks (writer), Heide Perlman (writer), Jerry Belson (writer), Ken Estin (writer), Sam Simon (writer), Marc Flanagan (writer), Jay Kogen (writer), Wallace Wolodarsky (writer), Michael Sardo (writer), Dick Blasucci (writer), Matt Groening (writer), Tracey Ullman (writer) | For "5W76" | Nominated |
| 1989 | Outstanding Individual Performance in a Variety or Music Program | Julie Kavner | For "Ginny vs. Roz"/"Dance Studio"/"The Simpsons" | Nominated |
| 1989 | Outstanding Editing for a Series – Multi-Camera Production | M. Pam Blumenthal (editor), Douglas Hines (editor) | For "To Masseur With Love" and "Conjugal Visit" | Nominated |
| 1989 | Outstanding Directing in a Variety or Music Program | Ted Bessell (director) | For "D.U.I.", "Family Therapy", "9 Minutes & 52 Seconds over Tokyo", "Conjugal Visit" | Nominated |
| 1989 | Outstanding Achievement in Hairstyling for a Series | Billy Laughridge (hairstylist) | For "The Subway" | Nominated |
| 1989 | Outstanding Achievement in Graphic Design and Title Sequences | Jeff Boortz (designer/animator), Ed Sullivan (designer/producer), Billy Pittard (production designer) | | Nominated |
| 1989 | Outstanding Variety, Music or Comedy Program | James L. Brooks (executive producer), Jerry Belson (executive producer), Heide Perlman (executive producer), Ken Estin (executive producer), Sam Simon (executive producer), Richard Sakai (producer), Ted Bessell (producer), Marc Flanagan (co-producer), Tracey Ullman (host) | | Won |
| 1989 | Outstanding Art Direction for a Variety or Music Program | Portia Iversen (set decorator) | For "All About Tammy Lee Maggie In Peril ", part II | Won |
| 1989 | Outstanding Achievement in Makeup for a Series | Thomas R. Burman (special makeup), Carol Schwartz (makeup artist), Bari Dreiband-Burman (special makeup), Robin LaVigne (makeup artist) | For "The Subway" | Won |
| 1989 | Outstanding Choreography | Paula Abdul (choreographer) | For "The Wave Girls", "D.U.I.", "The Cure" and "Maggie In Peril", part I | Won |
| 1990 | Outstanding Variety, Music or Comedy Series | Jerry Belson (executive producer), James L. Brooks (executive producer), Heide Perlman (executive producer), Sam Simon (executive producer), Marc Flanagan (supervising producer), Marilyn Suzanne Miller (senior producer), Richard Sakai (producer), Ted Bessell (producer), Dinah Kirgo (producer), Jay Kogen (co-producer), Wallace Wolodarsky (co-producer), Tracey Ullman (star) | | Nominated |
| 1990 | Outstanding Individual Performance in a Variety or Music Program | Julie Kavner | For "Parallel Existence (My Better Whole)"/"The Man That Got Away"/ "The Co-Op" | Nominated |
| 1990 | Outstanding Costume Design for a Variety or Music Program | Jane Ruhm (costume designer) | For "Creative Differences", "Tea" and "Jinx Haber Revisited" | Nominated |
| 1990 | Outstanding Art Direction for a Variety or Music Program | Stephen J. Lineweaver (production designer), Richard Lawrence (art director), Anne H. Ahrens (set decorator) | For "Creative Differences", "Tea" and "Jinx Haber Revisited" | Nominated |
| 1990 | Outstanding Makeup for a Series | Dale Bach-Siss (key makeup), Bari Dreiband-Burman (special effects makeup), Thomas R. Burman (special effects makeup), Dale Condit (makeup artist), Ron Walters (makeup artist) | For "Creative Differences" | Nominated |
| 1990 | Outstanding Variety, Music or Comedy Special | Jerry Belson (executive producer), James L. Brooks (executive producer), Heide Perlman (executive producer), Sam Simon (executive producer), Marc Flanagan (supervising producer), Richard Sakai (producer), Ted Bessell (producer), Dinah Kirgo (producer), Jay Kogen (co-producer), Wallace Wolodarsky (co-producer) | For "The Best of The Tracey Ullman Show" | Nominated |
| 1990 | Outstanding Makeup for a Miniseries or a Special | Dale Bach-Siss (key makeup), Dale Condit (makeup artist) | For "The Best of The Tracey Ullman Show" | Nominated |
| 1990 | Outstanding Writing in a Variety or Music Program | James L. Brooks (writer), Heide Perlman (writer), Sam Simon (writer), Jerry Belson (writer), Marc Flanagan (writer), Dinah Kirgo (writer), Jay Kogen (writer), Wallace Wolodarsky (writer), Ian Praiser (writer), Marilyn Suzanne Miller (writer), Tracey Ullman (writer) | For "Ginny Eats Escrow" & "I Hate Paris" | Won |
| 1990 | Outstanding Editing for a Series – Multi-Camera Production | Douglas Hines, M. Pam Blumenthal (film editor) | For "...And God Created Tillman" and "Rare Talent" | Won |
| 1990 | Outstanding Makeup for a Series | Thomas R. Burman (makeup artist), Bari Dreiband-Burman (makeup artist), Dale Condit (makeup artist), Ron Walters (makeup artist), Greg Nelson (makeup artist) | For "High School Sweethearts" | Won |
| 1990 | Outstanding Hairstyling for a Series | Linle White (hairstylist), Peggy Shannon (hairstylist) | For "My Date With Il Duce", "The Thrill Is Gone" and "The Wrong Message" | Won |
| 1990 | Outstanding Individual Performance in a Variety or Music Program | Tracey Ullman | For "The Best of The Tracey Ullman Show" | Won |
| 1990 | Outstanding Editing for a Miniseries or a Special – Multi-Camera Production | M. Pam Blumenthal (editor), Douglas Hines (editor), Brian K. Roberts (editor) | For "The Best of The Tracey Ullman Show" | Won |

=== Young Artist Awards ===
| Year | Category | Nominee | Episode | Result |
|---|---|---|---|---|
| 1998 | Best Young Actress Guest Starring in a Television Comedy Series | Tanya Fenmore | | Nominated |
| 1998 | Exceptional Performance by a Young Actor in a Television Comedy Series | Jacob Vargas | For "Viva Taco" | Nominated |
