= List of The Tracey Ullman Show episodes =

List of episodes of the Tracey Ulman Show

The following is an episode list for the American television sketch comedy variety show The Tracey Ullman Show, which ran for four seasons on Fox from April 5, 1987, to May 26, 1990, with a total of 81 episodes produced, along with one special.

Nearly every episode features a song; most of them covers. These are either incorporated into a sketch's score or performed by Ullman and/or the cast. They are noted in each episode summary. However, some episodes feature original songs; their titles remain unknown and thus unlisted.

The name Bonita Carlisle is the pseudonym for the show writing staff.

The Simpsons and Dr. N!Godatu (season one only) cartoon shorts are penned by Matt Groening and M.K. Brown, respectively. Season 4 does not feature any animated segments, except for a rerun of "Simpson Xmas" for the show's Christmas-themed episode.

== Series overview ==
Season	Segments	Episodes	Originally released	
Season	Segments	Episodes	First released	Last released
1	76	13	April 5, 1987	July 19, 1987
2	86	22	September 27, 1987	May 8, 1988
Special			October 30, 1988	
3	86	22	November 6, 1988	May 21, 1989
4	77	24	September 10, 1989	May 26, 1990

== Episodes ==
=== Season 1 (1987) ===
No. overall	No. in season	Title	Directed by	Written by	Original release date	Prod. code	Rating/share (households)
1	1	"The Makeover"	Harvey Miller	James L. Brooks & Jerry Belson & Ken Estin & Heide Perlman	April 5, 1987	4W02	4.7/8
1	1	"Dr. N!Godatu"	N/A	M.K. Brown	April 5, 1987	4W02	4.7/8
1	1	"Variety Act"	Harvey Miller	Ken Estin	April 5, 1987	4W02	4.7/8
1	1	"High Hopes"	Harvey Miller	N/A	April 5, 1987	4W02	4.7/8
1	1	"The Audition"	Harvey Miller	Miriam Trogdon	April 5, 1987	4W02	4.7/8
1	1	"Take Care"	Harvey Miller	Kim Fuller	April 5, 1987	4W02	4.7/8
The Makeover – A woman gets a makeover before meeting her prison pen pal. Dr. N!Godatu – Dr. N!Godatu wears her slippers to the office. Variety Act – Daniel Rosen performs. High Hopes – A young couple's dreams as dashed by Dreambuster. The Audition – A young woman auditions for a role. Take Care – Tracey decides to close the show by shouting "Go home!" Songs performed: "I Feel Pretty", "You Don't Own Me"
2	2	"The Letter"	Paul Flaherty	Heide Perlman	April 12, 1987	4W03	4.9/7
2	2	"Blind Date"	N/A	M.K. Brown	April 12, 1987	4W03	4.9/7
2	2	"Variety Act"	Paul Flaherty	N/A	April 12, 1987	4W03	4.9/7
2	2	"Quality Time"	Paul Flaherty	Ken Estin & Heide Perlman	April 12, 1987	4W03	4.9/7
2	2	"David Meets the Folks"	Paul Flaherty	Ken Estin & Heide Perlman	April 12, 1987	4W03	4.9/7
2	2	"British Men"	Paul Flaherty	Dick Blasucci	April 12, 1987	4W03	4.9/7
The Letter – A woman finds a letter from an old flame and decides to give him a call. Blind Date – Dr. N!Godatu goes on a date. Variety Act – Jamey Turner performs. Quality Time – The Downeys are forced to spend quality time with their son, Max. David Meets the Folks – A woman's stripper boyfriend meets her parents for the first time. British Men – Tracey discusses the differences between American and British men.
3	3	"Lottery"	Art Wolff	Ken Estin	April 19, 1987	4W04	N/A
3	3	"Good Night"	Wesley Archer & David Silverman & Bill Kopp	Matt Groening	April 19, 1987	4W04	N/A
3	3	"Ambulance Pick Up"	Art Wolff	Ken Estin & Heide Perlman	April 19, 1987	4W04	N/A
3	3	"Girl on a Ledge"	Harvey Miller	Susan Herring	April 19, 1987	4W04	N/A
3	3	"Golf"	Art Wolff	Paul Flaherty	April 19, 1987	4W04	N/A
Lottery – A woman refuses to split her lottery winnings with her best friend. Good Night – Homer and Marge put their kids to bed. Ambulance Pickup – An injured man tries to pick up the medic treating him. Girl on a Ledge – A suicidal woman and police officer dance together on a ledge. Golf – Tracey complains about Palm Springs, golf courses, and Allan's horrible golf trousers. Song performed: "If She Knew What She Wants"
4	4	"Like Mother"	Harvey Miller	Heide Perlman	April 26, 1987	4W01	N/A
4	4	"Freeway"	N/A	M.K. Brown	April 26, 1987	4W01	N/A
4	4	"Spontaneity"	Art Wolff	Ken Estin	April 26, 1987	4W01	N/A
4	4	"Answering Machine"	Harvey Miller	Ken Estin	April 26, 1987	4W01	N/A
4	4	"Inhale Pink"	Harvey Miller	Kim Fuller	April 26, 1987	4W01	N/A
Like Mother – A woman fears she's turning into her mother. Freeway – Dr. N!Godatu goes on the freeway and her friend Pat ends up having to drive on it. Spontaneity – A couple tries to be more spontaneous. Answering Machine – A woman unhappy with her outgoing answering machine message decides to jazz things up. Inhale Pink – Tracey talks about getting in shape for the show after having had a baby and her aerobics teacher teaching her to inhale pink and exhale blue.
5	5	"Opening"	Penny Marshall	N/A	May 3, 1987	4W06	N/A
5	5	"Comedian"	Penny Marshall	Miriam Trogdon	May 3, 1987	4W06	N/A
5	5	"Watching Television"	N/A	Matt Groening	May 3, 1987	4W06	N/A
5	5	"Kay and the Co-Worker"	Art Wolff	Miriam Trogdon	May 3, 1987	4W06	N/A
5	5	"The Right Guy"	Penny Marshall	Harvey Miller & Jane Lancellotti	May 3, 1987	4W06	N/A
5	5	"Mabel"	Penny Marshall	Kim Fuller	May 3, 1987	4W06	N/A
Opening – Tracey is opening the show, not just closing it. Comedian – A woman convinces her comedian boyfriend to change his act. Watching Television – Bart and Lisa fight over the TV. Kay and the Co-Worker – Kay thinks her new co-worker is a practical joke. The Right Guy – A man tries to get up the nerve to tell a woman how he feels about her through a song. Mabel – Tracey discusses her agent and her daughter, Mabel.
6	6	"Derek"	Art Wolff	Ken Estin & Heide Perlman	May 10, 1987	4W07	N/A
6	6	"Kay on Vacation"	Art Wolff	Miriam Trogdon	May 10, 1987	4W07	N/A
6	6	"Bart Jumps"	N/A	Matt Groening	May 10, 1987	4W07	N/A
6	6	"The Session"	Art Wolff	Ken Levine & David Isaacs	May 10, 1987	4W07	N/A
6	6	"Close to You"	Art Wolff	Kim Fuller	May 10, 1987	4W07	N/A
6	6	"Houses"	Art Wolff	Kim Fuller & Marc Flanagan	May 10, 1987	4W07	N/A
Derek – It's the second week of the format change and one viewer has written in saying he's enjoyed it. Kay on Vacation – Kay goes on vacation. Bart Jumps – Homer tries to get Bart to jump into his arms without much success. The Session – Dr. Gibson has a heart attack in his office and Brenda is forced to take action. Close to You – A lounge singer doesn't want to be close to "Steve". Houses – Tracey talks about looking for a house in California and dealing with realtors. Song performed: "(They Long to Be) Close to You"
7	7	"Opening"	Art Wolff	N/A	May 17, 1987	4W26	N/A
7	7	"Francesca – A Girl's Life"	Art Wolff	Heide Perlman	May 17, 1987	4W26	N/A
7	7	"Fishtank"	N/A	M.K. Brown	May 17, 1987	4W26	N/A
7	7	"Happy Lady"	Harvey Miller	Heide Perlman	May 17, 1987	4W26	N/A
7	7	"Vive La Different"	Penny Marshall	Marc Flanagan	May 17, 1987	4W26	N/A
7	7	"Closing"	Art Wolff	N/A	May 17, 1987	4W26	N/A
Opening – The third week of the format change and everything is running smoothly–oops, spoke too soon. Francesca – A Girl's Life – Francesca goes on her first date. Fishtank – Dr. N!Godatu is having problems with the fish in her fish tank. Happy Lady – A very happy lady makes life miserable for her hospital roommate. Vive La Different – A different kind of singer for a rock band. Closing – Tracey's getting ready to go to a wedding and discusses the suit Allan will be wearing. Note: Ken Estin & Heide Perlman receive an Additional Writing writing credit
8	8	"Opening"	Art Wolff	N/A	May 31, 1987	4W08	N/A
8	8	"Trapeze"	Art Wolff	Ken Estin	May 31, 1987	4W08	N/A
8	8	"Babysitting Maggie"	N/A	Matt Groening	May 31, 1987	4W08	N/A
8	8	"Smalls' Talk"	Art Wolff	Marc Flanagan	May 31, 1987	4W08	N/A
8	8	"Last Chance Commercial"	Paul Flaherty	Ken Estin & Heide Perlman	May 31, 1987	4W08	N/A
8	8	"Closing"	Art Wolff	N/A	May 31, 1987	4W08	N/A
Opening – Tracey's in the makeup chair talking about getting to be a trapeze artist in tonight's show. Trapeze – Two Russian trapeze artists, who are also family, have a falling out over a man. Babysitting Maggie – Bart and Lisa are supposed to be taking care of baby sister Maggie who gets into all sorts of mischief without their knowledge. Smalls' Talk – A talk radio psychologist decides to only take callers with insignificant problems. Last Chance Commercial – Sandra Decker gets a television commercial. Closing – Tracey talks about last week's wedding and the difference between American and British weddings. Song performed: "Stand by Me" Note: Jerry Belson receives an Additional Material writing credit
9	9	"Opening"	Ted Bessell	N/A	June 14, 1987	4W09	N/A
9	9	"Meg and Tina in August"	Ted Bessell	Susan Herring	June 14, 1987	4W09	N/A
9	9	"The Dream"	N/A	M.K. Browning	June 14, 1987	4W09	N/A
9	9	"Pre-School"	Stuart Margolin	Dick Blasucci & Paul Flaherty	June 14, 1987	4W09	N/A
9	9	"Kiki Howard-Smith Sings"	Ted Bessell	Ken Levine & David Isaacs	June 14, 1987	4W09	N/A
9	9	"Closing"	Ted Bessell	N/A	June 14, 1987	4W09	N/A
Opening – Tracey wonders why the producers keep casting her as sexy femme fatales. Meg and Tina in August – Meg is tired of Tina ditching her for guys when they go out together. The Dream – Dr. N!Godatu's strange dream. Pre-School – The Downeys try to get Max enrolled in preschool. Kiki Howard-Smith Sings – Kiki sings about golf and shoots a music video. Closing – The show is running a little late so Tracey won't have time to tell the audience her celebrity Jacuzzi story. Song performed: "War" (altered to "Golf") Note: Ken Estin & Heide Perlman receive a Special Writing writing credit
10	10	"Opening"	Ted Bessell	N/A	June 21, 1987	4W10	N/A
10	10	"Ariel's Comeback"	Ted Bessell	Heide Perlman	June 21, 1987	4W10	N/A
10	10	"The Pacifier"	N/A	Matt Groening	June 21, 1987	4W10	N/A
10	10	"Dance Challenge"	Ted Bessell	Ken Estin & Heide Perlman	June 21, 1987	4W10	N/A
10	10	"Sir"	Stuart Margolin	Bonita Carlisle	June 21, 1987	4W10	N/A
10	10	"Closing"	Ted Bessell	N/A	June 21, 1987	4W10	N/A
Opening – In tonight's show, Tracey reveals she's playing a woman who's trying to make a comeback; she's not, people love her. Ariel's Comeback – A tortured singer finds happiness. The Pacifier – Bart and Lisa try taking Maggie's pacifier away from her. Dance Challenge – A dancer goes on without her underwear. Sir – A man who's been serving a snobby woman lunch since she was a child announces it's his last day. Closing – An elaborate "Good night". Song performed: "To Sir with Love" Note: Ken Estin & Heide Perlman & Richard Sakai receive a Special Material writing credit
11	11	"Opening"	Ted Bessell	N/A	June 28, 1987	4W25	N/A
11	11	"Breakfast"	Ted Bessell	Michael Leeson	June 28, 1987	4W25	N/A
11	11	"Burp Contest"	N/A	Matt Groening	June 28, 1987	4W25	N/A
11	11	"Crisis on Elm Drive"	Ted Bessell	Ken Levine & David Isaacs	June 28, 1987	4W25	N/A
11	11	"Meg & Tina Get Pizza"	Stuart Margolin	Dick Blasucci & Paul Flaherty	June 28, 1987	4W25	N/A
11	11	"Closing"	Ted Bessell	N/A	June 28, 1987	4W25	N/A
Opening – Tracey talks about tonight's first sketch and why she's letting Julie Kavner play the role, even though she does a good impersonation of Julie herself. Breakfast – An unhappy married couple talk about their relationship over breakfast. Burp Contest – The Simpson kids hold a burping contest despite Marge's objections. Crisis on Elm Drive – Sara and Greg are forced to take care of Max when the nanny needs the weekend off. Meg & Tina Get Pizza – Tina dances with a guy in a parking lot. Closing – Tracey's gone and gotten a car phone. Songs performed: "Addicted to Love", "Brass in Pocket" Note: Marc Flanagan receives a Special Material writing credit
12	12	"Opening"	Stuart Margolin	N/A	July 12, 1987	4W11	N/A
12	12	"Francesca's Choice"	Stuart Margolin	Heide Perlman	July 12, 1987	4W11	N/A
12	12	"Eating Dinner"	N/A	Matt Groening	July 12, 1987	4W11	N/A
12	12	"Gotta Dance"	Stuart Margolin	Heide Perlman	July 12, 1987	4W11	N/A
12	12	"Scandal"	Art Wolff	Kim Fuller	July 12, 1987	4W11	N/A
12	12	"Closing"	Stuart Margolin	N/A	July 12, 1987	4W11	N/A
Opening – Tracey talks about playing a teenager. Francesca's Choice – Francesca's teacher tries to persuade her not to reveal that her parents are gay in an essay that she's to submit in a contest. Eating Dinner – Marge serves dinner. Gotta Dance – Dr. Gibson's patient finally opens up through dance. Scandal – The wife of a British MP tries to stand by her husband during a sex scandal. Closing – Tracey talks about her cat, Lucky. Note: Ken Estin & Heide Perlman receive a Special Material writing credit
13	13	"Opening"	Stuart Margolin	N/A	July 19, 1987	4W12	N/A
13	13	"Kay's Happy Hour"	Stuart Margolin	Dick Blasucci & Paul Flaherty	July 19, 1987	4W12	N/A
13	13	"Scanner"	N/A	M.K. Brown	July 19, 1987	4W12	N/A
13	13	"Click"	Ted Bessell	Ken Levine & David Isaacs	July 19, 1987	4W12	N/A
13	13	"What I Did for Love"	Stuart Margolin	Ken Estin & Heide Perlman	July 19, 1987	4W12	N/A
13	13	"Closing"	Stuart Margolin	N/A	July 19, 1987	4W12	N/A
Opening – Tracey talks about playing Kay in tonight's episode. Kay's Happy Hour – Kay quits her job. Scanner – Dr. N!Godatu uses her new machine that allows her to see patients' thoughts as they are thinking them. Click – A father finds it difficult to take his eyes off the boob tube. What I Did for Love – A mother and daughter audition together. Closing – Tracey continues the story of Lucky. Songs performed: "We'll Meet Again", "What I Did for Love" Guest star: Matthew Perry Note: Jack Winter receives a Special Material writing credit

=== Season 2 (1987–88) ===
No. overall	No. in season	Title	Directed by	Written by	Original release date	Prod. code	Rating/share (households)
14	1	"Opening"	Art Wolff	Bonita Carlise	September 27, 1987	4W16	2.7
14	1	"Meg's Lucky Night"	Art Wolff	Sam Simon	September 27, 1987	4W16	2.7
14	1	"Making Faces"	N/A	Matt Groening	September 27, 1987	4W16	2.7
14	1	"Skin the Duck"	Art Wolff	Bonita Carlise	September 27, 1987	4W16	2.7
14	1	"Closing"	Art Wolff	Bonita Carlise	September 27, 1987	4W16	2.7
Opening – Steve Martin has been duped into thinking he can sleep with Tracey. Meg's Lucky Night – Meg announces she's in love. Making Faces – Marge warns Bart and Lisa that if they keep making ugly faces they'll freeze that way. Skin the Duck – A dancer is given a bizarre dance routine to perform at an audition. Closing – Tracey talks about attending the Prince's Trust concert. Guest star: Steve Martin
15	2	"Opening"	Art Wolff	Bonita Carlise	October 4, 1987	4W17	3.0
15	2	"Kay's Old Love"	Art Wolff	Jay Kogen & Wallace Wolodarsky	October 4, 1987	4W17	3.0
15	2	"The Funeral"	N/A	Matt Groening	October 4, 1987	4W17	3.0
15	2	"Drugs & Guns"	Art Wolff	Jay Kogen & Wallace Wolodarsky	October 4, 1987	4W17	3.0
15	2	"Closing"	Art Wolff	Bonita Carlise	October 4, 1987	4W17	3.0
Opening – Tracey helps us learn the words to the show's theme song. Kay's Old Love – Kay meets an old flame who asks to run away with him. The Funeral – The Simpsons attend a funeral. Drugs and Guns – A suicidal pharmacist is held up after having already taken an overdose. Closing – Tracey attempts to introduce Julie Kavner. Song performed: "Mama Said"
16	3	"Opening"	Art Wolff	N/A	October 11, 1987	4W14	2.7
16	3	"Francesca's First Job"	Art Wolff	Sam Simon	October 11, 1987	4W14	2.7
16	3	"Maggie's Brain"	N/A	Matt Groening	October 11, 1987	4W14	2.7
16	3	"The Little Neurotic From Down Under"	Art Wolff	Sam Simon	October 11, 1987	4W14	2.7
16	3	"City of Strangers"	Sam Simon	Marc Flanagan	October 11, 1987	4W14	2.7
Opening – Tracey is sharing her dressing room with a werewolf. Francesca's First Job – Francesca gets her first job and learns the harsh realities of the real world. Maggie's Brain – What's Maggie thinking? The Little Neurotic From Down Under – Kiki Howard-Smith sees Dr. Gibson to combat her fear of flying. City of Strangers – A woman tries to get a bunch of strangers to sing at a New York City bus stop. Closing – Tracey is thrilled that Mabel isn't tone-deaf like her father. Song performed: "The Lion Sleeps Tonight" Note: Ken Estin & Heide Perlman & Tracey Ullman receive a Special Material writing credit
17	4	"Opening"	Sam Simon	Marc Flanagan	October 18, 1987	4W24	4.0
17	4	"The Affair"	Art Wolff	M.K. Brown	October 18, 1987	4W24	4.0
17	4	"Football"	N/A	Ken Estin	October 18, 1987	4W24	4.0
17	4	"When in Rome"	Stuart Margolin	Marc Flanagan	October 18, 1987	4W24	4.0
17	4	"Weather or Not"	Art Wolff	Dick Blasucci	October 18, 1987	4W24	4.0
17	4	"Closing"	Sam Simon	Bonita Carlisle & Tracey Ullman	October 18, 1987	4W24	4.0
Opening – Tracey shows off the rest of her dressing room. The Affair – The Downeys stay up all night dealing with Greg's office affair. Football – Bart tries to catch a football. When in Rome – A man in the witness relocation tries to fit in. Weather or Not – A USO show for one. Closing – Tracey discusses trying to get away with Allan. Songs performed: "Proud Mary", "I'll Be Seeing You"
18	5	"Opening"	Ted Bessell	N/A	October 25, 1987	4W15	3.4
18	5	"The Gardener on the Floor"	Art Wolff	Sam Simon	October 25, 1987	4W15	3.4
18	5	"House of Cards"	N/A	Matt Groening	October 25, 1987	4W15	3.4
18	5	"Calendar Girl"	Art Wolff	Ken Estin & Heide Perlman	October 25, 1987	4W15	3.4
18	5	"Decoration Day"	Art Wolff	Dick Blasucci & Marc Flanagan & Tony Berg & Dan Castellaneta	October 25, 1987	4W15	3.4
18	5	"Closing"	Art Wolff	N/A	October 25, 1987	4W15	3.4
Opening – Tracey performs a magic trick. The Gardener on the Floor – A woman tries to sell her play. House of Cards – Bart tries to build a house of cards. Calendar Girl – A model seeks inspiration during a photo shoot. Decoration Day – An indecisive woman decides to paint her kitchen black. Closing – Tracey talks about how her husband used to travel before they had Mabel. Songs performed: "I Dreamed a Dream", "Paint It Black" Note: Bonita Carlisle & Tracey Ullman receive a Special Material writing credit
19	6	"Opening"	Art Wolff	Marc Flanagan	November 1, 1987	4W05	2.9
19	6	"Monkey Wrench"	Art Wolff	Marc Flanagan	November 1, 1987	4W05	2.9
19	6	"Bart and Dad Eat Dinner"	N/A	Matt Groening	November 1, 1987	4W05	2.9
19	6	"The Concert"	Penny Marshall	Doug Steckler	November 1, 1987	4W05	2.9
19	6	"Birthday Boy"	Penny Marshall	Dick Blasucci & Paul Flaherty	November 1, 1987	4W05	2.9
19	6	"Closing"	Penny Marshall	Kim Fuller & Marc Flanagan	November 1, 1987	4W05	2.9
Opening – Tracey relates her own experience coming to America from England to tonight's first sketch. Monkey Wench – An anthropologist leaves her research in the jungle for the Big Apple to visit family with her orangutan. Bart and Dad Eat Dinner – Bart and Homer eat dinner. The Concert – A woman prepares to perform a piece on her organ at a hockey rink. Birthday Boy – A man receives a singing telegram. Closing – Tracey talks about her new car.
20	7	"Opening"	Ted Bessell	N/A	November 8, 1987	4W18	2.9
20	7	"Max's Birthday Party"	Ted Bessell	Heide Perlman	November 8, 1987	4W18	2.9
20	7	"Space Patrol"	N/A	Matt Groening	November 8, 1987	4W18	2.9
20	7	"Two Too Good People"	Ted Bessell	Sam Simon	November 8, 1987	4W18	2.9
20	7	"Beverly Hills Proc"	Ted Bessell	Dick Blasucci & Marc Flanagan	November 8, 1987	4W18	2.9
20	7	"Closing"	Art Wolff	N/A	November 8, 1987	4W18	2.9
Opening – Tracey introduces Dan, Sam, and Joe. Max's Birthday Party – Sara and Greg hire uncooperative Fuzzy Bear for Max's birthday party. Space Patrol – Lisa and Maggie battle the evil Bartron. Two Too Good People – A realtor and potential buyer fall in love. Beverly Hills Proc – Ginny and Lawrence work out the details of their divorce settlement in the presence of their attorneys (and Lawrence's new squeeze). Closing – Tracey reveals how someone who works on the lot and watches the show told her that they can't understand a word she's saying. Song performed: "Goldfinger" Note: Bonita Carlise & Tracey Ullman receive a Special Material writing credit
21	8	"Opening"	Ted Bessell	N/A	November 15, 1987	4W13	N/A
21	8	"Romantic Mommy"	Art Wolff	Heide Perlman	November 15, 1987	4W13	N/A
21	8	"Bart's Haircut"	N/A	Matt Groening	November 15, 1987	4W13	N/A
21	8	"K-AIR"	Art Wolff	Jay Kogen & Wallace Wolodarsky	November 15, 1987	4W13	N/A
21	8	"Closing"	Art Wolff	N/A	November 15, 1987	4W13	N/A
Opening – Tracey introduces her dogs. Romantic Mommy – Francesca's mother comes for a visit. Bart's Haircut – Bart is forced to get a haircut. K-AIR – Rock DJ Summer Storm tries to wake up her listeners. Closing – Tracey's mum is embarrassed that she hasn't been in the newspapers back home in England. Song performed: "Radio Radio" Note: Bonita Carlisle & Tracey Ullman receive a Special Material writing credit
22	9	"Opening"	Art Wolff	N/A	November 22, 1987	4W22	3.2
22	9	"Meg's Shower"	Ted Bessell	Jay Kogen & Wallace Wolodarsky	November 22, 1987	4W22	3.2
22	9	"World War III"	N/A	Matt Groening	November 22, 1987	4W22	3.2
22	9	"Foreign Exchange"	Art Wolff	Jay Kogen & Wallace Wolodarsky	November 22, 1987	4W22	3.2
22	9	"Closing"	Ted Bessell	N/A	November 22, 1987	4W22	3.2
Opening – Tracey introduces Cheech Marin. Meg's Shower – Meg and Tina fight at Meg's bridal shower. World War III – Homer runs drills for World War III. Foreign Exchange – A convenience store owner works up the nerve to ask out a delivery woman. Closing – Tracey reveals what she was doing during a recent earthquake in Los Angeles. Song performed: "Misty" Guest star: Cheech Marin Note: Bonita Carlisle & Tracey Ullman receive a Special Material writing credit
23	10	"Opening"	Sam Simon	N/A	December 13, 1987	4W19	3.1
23	10	"Kay's Adventure"	Sam Simon	Ken Levine & Davis Isaacs	December 13, 1987	4W19	3.1
23	10	"The Perfect Crime"	N/A	Matt Groening	December 13, 1987	4W19	3.1
23	10	"Variety Act"	Sam Simon	N/A	December 13, 1987	4W19	3.1
23	10	"Customs"	Art Wolff	Dick Blasucci & Paul Flaherty	December 13, 1987	4W19	3.1
23	10	"Closing"	Ted Bessell	N/A	December 13, 1987	4W19	3.1
Opening – Tracey shows off a new feature in her dressing room. Kay's Adventure – Kay wins a trip to Atlantic City. The Perfect Crime – Bart tries to steal cookies. Variety Act – Tom Noddy, bubble artist. Customs – A Scottish rock singer tries to get through customs as fast as possible. Closing – Tracey brings out her dogs. Songs performed: "Ladies' Night", "All by Myself", "You Are So Beautiful" Note: Bonita Carlisle & Tracey Ullman receive a Special Material writing credit
24	11	"Opening"	Ted Bessell	N/A	December 20, 1987	4W21	2.5
24	11	"Rock Bottom"	Art Wolff	Dick Blasucci & Marc Flanagan	December 20, 1987	4W21	2.5
24	11	"Scary Stories"	N/A	Matt Groening	December 20, 1987	4W21	2.5
24	11	"The Cryonic Man"	Ted Bessell	Ken Estin	December 20, 1987	4W21	2.5
24	11	"Closing"	Ted Bessell	N/A	December 20, 1987	4W21	2.5
Opening – Tracey can't find her dressing room. Rock Bottom – Summer Storm tries to clean up her act. Scary Stories– Bart tells Lisa and Maggie scary stories. The Cryonic Man – A woman learns that her husband has frozen himself. Closing – Tracey talks about looking for Bruce Willis and Cybill Shepherd on the Fox lot. Songs performed: "Born to Be Wild", "The Gambler", "When I Think of You", "Cold as Ice" Note: Bonita Carlisle & Tracey Ullman receive a Special Material writing credit
25	12	"Opening"	Ted Bessell	N/A	January 10, 1988	4W23	3.8
25	12	"Kay's Last Stand"	Art Wolff	Dick Blasucci & Paul Flaherty	January 10, 1988	4W23	3.8
25	12	"Grandpa and the Kids"	N/A	Matt Groening	January 10, 1988	4W23	3.8
25	12	"Auto Erotica"	Ted Bessell	Heide Perlman	January 10, 1988	4W23	3.8
25	12	"Waiting"	Art Wolff	Jay Kogen & Wallace Wolodarsky	January 10, 1988	4W23	3.8
25	12	"Closing"	Ted Bessell	N/A	January 10, 1988	4W23	3.8
Opening – Tracey opens the show sitting in the audience. Kay's Last Stand – Kay is horrified to learn that her mother's medical policy has been cancelled. Grandpa and the Kids – The Simpson kids are forced to spend time with Grandpa. Auto Erotica – Brenda comes up with a new way to meet men – have them arrested. Waiting – A woman waits for a washing machine repairman. Closing – Tracey talks about Mabel's alarm clock waking her up at night. Song performed: "It Must Be Him" Note: Bonita Carlisle & Tracey Ullman receive a Special Material writing credit
26	13	"Opening"	Ted Bessell	N/A	January 24, 1988	4W20	4.6
26	13	"On Her Toes"	Ted Bessell	Dick Blasucci	January 24, 1988	4W20	4.6
26	13	"Gone Fishin'"	N/A	Matt Groening	January 24, 1988	4W20	4.6
26	13	"Tina and the Professor"	Art Wolff	Ken Estin	January 24, 1988	4W20	4.6
26	13	"The High and the Not So Mighty"	Ted Bessell	Marc Flanagan	January 24, 1988	4W20	4.6
26	13	"Closing"	Ted Bessell	N/A	January 24, 1988	4W20	4.6
Opening – Tracey's gifts from viewers. On Her Toes – A ballerina gets her big break. Gone Fishin' – Bart and Homer go fishing. Tina and the Professor – Tina receives a lesson in ecstasy on a blind date. The High and the Not So Mighty – The USO troupe decide to give one final performance before their plane crashes. Closing – Tracey introduces the crew. Song performed: "Rescue Me" Note: Bonita Carlisle receives a Special Material writing credit
27	14	"Opening"	Art Wolff	N/A	February 7, 1988	5W01	3.1
27	14	"Valet"	Ted Bessell	Ken Estin	February 7, 1988	5W01	3.1
27	14	"Skateboarding"	N/A	Matt Groening	February 7, 1988	5W01	3.1
27	14	"Gold Diggers of 1988"	Ted Bessell	Jay Kogen & Wallace Wolodarsky	February 7, 1988	5W01	3.1
27	14	"Closing"	Ted Bessell	N/A	February 7, 1988	5W01	3.1
Opening – Tracey introduces George Clinton. Valet – A woman asks a valet attendant to spend the night with her. Skateboarding – Bart skateboards. Gold Diggers of 1988 – A May December wedding reception. Closing – Tracey talks about her holiday in Hawaii and the language. Song performed: "He's a Rebel" Guest star: George Clinton Note: Bonita Carlisle & Tracey Ullman receive a Special Material writing credit
28	15	"Opening"	Art Wolff	N/A	February 14, 1988	5W02	3.0
28	15	"Chained Melodies"	Ted Bessell	Dick Blasucci & Marc Flanagan	February 14, 1988	5W02	3.0
28	15	"The Pagans"	N/A	Matt Groening	February 14, 1988	5W02	3.0
28	15	"The Test"	Ted Bessell	Holly Holmberg Brooks & J.C. Scott	February 14, 1988	5W02	3.0
28	15	"Closing"	Ted Bessell	N/A	February 14, 1988	5W02	3.0
Opening – Tracey introduces Matt Groening. Chained Melodies – Angel and Marty Tish perform for prison inmates. The Pagans – The Simpson kids don't want to go to church – they're Pagans. The Test – Sara and Greg Downey prepare themselves, and their son, Max, for the results of a pregnancy test. Closing – Tracey talks about doing charity work. Song performed: "I Got You Babe" Guest star: Matt Groening Note: Sam Simon & Tracey Ullman receive a Special Material writing credit
29	16	"Opening"	Ted Bessell	N/A	February 21, 1988	5W03	3.2
29	16	"Storm at Sea"	Ted Bessell	Marc Flanagan	February 21, 1988	5W03	3.2
29	16	"The Closet"	N/A	Matt Groening	February 21, 1988	5W03	3.2
29	16	"A Little Stream of Consciousness from Down Under"	Sam Simon	Sam Simon	February 21, 1988	5W03	3.2
29	16	"The Pits"	Ted Bessell	Marc Flanagan	February 21, 1988	5W03	3.2
Opening – It's payday! Storm at Sea – Summer Storm DJs a pirate radio station. The Closet – Bart locks himself in the closet. A Little Stream of Consciousness from Down Under – Kiki can't concentrate on making a putt. The Pits – A woman tries to get a floor trader's attention. Closing – Mabel thinks Tracey is everyone. Song performed: "Shout" Note: Bonita Carlisle & Tracey Ullman receive a Special Material writing credit
30	17	"Opening"	Ted Bessell	N/A	February 28, 1988	5W04	4.2
30	17	"Changing Lanes"	Ted Bessell	Jay Kogen & Wallace Wolodarsky	February 28, 1988	5W04	4.2
30	17	"The Aquarium"	N/A	Matt Groening	February 28, 1988	5W04	4.2
30	17	"Treasure"	Ted Bessell	Ken Estin	February 28, 1988	5W04	4.2
30	17	"Wings of Love"	Ted Bessell	Ken Estin	February 28, 1988	5W04	4.2
30	17	"Closing"	Art Wolff	N/A	February 28, 1988	5W04	4.2
Opening – Tracey's story is cut short for time. Changing Lanes – An accomplished woman dying of a disease decides to change course and live with her sister in the suburbs. The Aquarium – The Simpsons spend the day at the aquarium. Treasure – Greed takes over the lives of a ship full of treasure hunters. Wings of Love – A woman needs a plane ticket in a hurry. Closing – Tracey talks about the doctored poster of her Fox erected on the Fox studio lot. Song performed: "The Letter" Note: Bonita Carlisle & Tracey Ullman receive a Special Material writing credit
31	18	"Opening"	Art Wolff	N/A	March 6, 1988	5W05	3.3
31	18	"Francessca Alone"	Ted Bessell	Jay Kogen & Wallace Wolodarsky	March 6, 1988	5W05	3.3
31	18	"Family Portrait"	N/A	Matt Groening	March 6, 1988	5W05	3.3
31	18	"People at Work"	Art Wolff	Craig Heller & Guy Shulman	March 6, 1988	5W05	3.3
31	18	"Closing"	Ted Bessell	N/A	March 6, 1988	5W05	3.3
Opening – How to get to the Fox network in parts of the country with a weak UHF signal. Francesca Alone – Francesca invites a boy over with her folks out of town. Family Portrait – Homer tries to take the perfect family portrait. People at Work – A woman working construction is worried the job has cost her her femininity. Closing – Tracey shows off her Golden Globe Awards dress. Song performed: "(You Make Me Feel Like) A Natural Woman" Note: Sam Simon & Tracey Ullman receive a Special Material writing credit
32	19	"Opening"	Art Wolff	N/A	March 13, 1988	5W06	3.1
32	19	"Ginny Redux"	Art Wolff	Marc Flanagan	March 13, 1988	5W06	3.1
32	19	"Bart's Hiccups"	N/A	Matt Groening	March 13, 1988	5W06	3.1
32	19	"Fear"	Ted Bessell	Jay Kogen & Wallace Wolodarsky	March 13, 1988	5W06	3.1
32	19	"Real Lace"	Ted Bessell	Marc Flanagan	March 13, 1988	5W06	3.1
32	19	"Closing"	Ted Bessell	N/A	March 13, 1988	5W06	3.1
Opening – Tracey is a spy. Ginny Redux – Ginny's first date since her divorce. Bart's Hiccups – Lisa and Maggie try to cure Bart of his hiccups. Fear – Dr. Gibson tries to help a patient with an abundance of fears. Real Lace – A Boston hotel with phenomenal service. Closing – Tracey talks about how Americans think because she's English she must know the royal family personally. Song performed: "The Castle of Dromore" Guest star: Frank Patterson Note: Sam Simon & Tracey Ullman receive a Special Material writing credit
33	20	"Opening"	Ted Bessell	N/A	March 20, 1988	5W07	3.3
33	20	"Kay: R.E.S.P.E.C.T."	Ted Bessell	Marc Flanagan	March 20, 1988	5W07	3.3
33	20	"The Money Jar"	N/A	Matt Groening	March 20, 1988	5W07	3.3
33	20	"Late Night Checkout"	Ted Bessell	Rob Bragin	March 20, 1988	5W07	3.3
33	20	"Closing"	Art Wolff	N/A	March 20, 1988	5W07	3.3
Opening – Watching the show the BBC way. Kay: R.E.S.P.E.C.T. – Kay discovers that her co-worker has been stealing from the office. The Money Jar – The Simpsons kids promise not to touch the money jar. Late Night Checkout – Confusing late night customers. Closing – Tracey's getting Liv Ullmann's mail. Songs performed: "Respect", "Three Little Maids" (lyric altered to "Two") Note: Bonita Carlisle & Tracey Ullman receive a Special Material writing credit
34	21	"Opening"	Ted Bessell	N/A	May 1, 1988	5W09	3.2
34	21	"The Sleepover"	Ted Bessell	J.C. Scott & Holly Holmberg Brooks	May 1, 1988	5W09	3.2
34	21	"The Art Museum"	N/A	Matt Groening	May 1, 1988	5W09	3.2
34	21	"Dr. Gibson's Mentor"	Ted Bessell	Jay Kogen & Wallace Wolodarsky	May 1, 1988	5W09	3.2
34	21	"Closing"	Ted Bessell	N/A	May 1, 1988	5W09	3.2
Opening – Tracey takes her physical examination. The Sleepover – Francesca has a sleepover. The Art Museum – The Simpsons visit an art museum. Dr. Gibson's Mentor – Dr. Gibson's mentor admits to being a fraud. Closing – Tracey brings out Doris Grau. Songs performed: "Time After Time", "Is This Love", "You'll Never Walk Alone" Note: Bonita Carlisle & Tracey Ullman receive a Special Material writing credit
35	22	"Opening"	Art Wolff	N/A	May 8, 1988	5W08	2.8
35	22	"Dinner Time"	Art Wolff	Manny Basanese & Debra Korbel	May 8, 1988	5W08	2.8
35	22	"Zoo Story"	N/A	Matt Groening	May 8, 1988	5W08	2.8
35	22	"Cinema Verite"	Art Wolff	Jay Kogen & Wallace Wolodarsky	May 8, 1988	5W08	2.8
35	22	"The Medley"	Ted Bessell	Ken Estin	May 8, 1988	5W08	2.8
35	22	"Closing"	Ted Bessell	N/A	May 8, 1988	5W08	2.8
Opening – Everyone has a suggestion for the show. Dinner Time – A tough crowd at a dinner theater. Zoo Story – The Simpsons visit the zoo. Cinema Verite – A reporter attempts to blow the lid off a woman's plight. The Medley – A musical duo sings a depressing medley of songs. Closing – Mabel's cry for attention. Songs performed: "Last Kiss", "Teen Angel", "Patches", "Laurie (Strange Things Happen)" Note: Sam Simon & Tracey Ullman receive a Special Material writing credit

=== Special (1988) ===
Title	Directed by	Written by	Original release date	Prod. code	Rating/share (households)
"Tracey Ullman Backstage"	Suzanne McCafferty	Rick Sublett	October 30, 1988	N/A	4.8/7
A one-hour behind-the-scenes making of special.

=== Season 3 (1988–89) ===
No. overall	No. in season	Title	Directed by	Written by	Original release date	Prod. code	Rating/share (households)
36	1	"9 Minutes and 52 Seconds Over Tokyo"	Ted Bessell	Dick Blasucci & Marc Flanagan	November 6, 1988	5W10	N/A
36	1	"Shut Up Simpsons"	N/A	Matt Groening	November 6, 1988	5W10	N/A
36	1	"Our Dinner at Troy's"	Ted Bessell	Heide Perlman	November 6, 1988	5W10	N/A
36	1	"Closing"	Ted Bessell	N/A	November 6, 1988	5W10	N/A
9 Minutes and 52 Seconds Over Tokyo – Marty Tish is reunited with the son he never knew he had. Shut Up Simpsons – The Simpsons attempt to get along after bickering. Our Dinner at Troy's – Sara and Greg are thrown out of a trendy restaurant. Closing – Tracey brings out Marty Jr. Songs performed: "Bad", "Sukiyaki"
37	2	"Tell and Kiss"	Ted Bessell	Sam Simon	November 13, 1988	5W11	N/A
37	2	"The Shell Game"	N/A	Matt Groening	November 13, 1988	5W11	N/A
37	2	"The Big Wheel"	Ted Bessell	Bonita Carlisle	November 13, 1988	5W11	N/A
37	2	"Closing"	Ted Bessell	N/A	November 13, 1988	5W11	N/A
Tell and Kiss – Sandra Decker publishes a scandalous tell-all. The Shell Game – Bart plays hide the cookie. The Big Wheel – A woman takes a spin to win $20 million. Closing – Tracey asks Cesar Romero what it's like working in front of a live audience. Guest star: Cesar Romero Note: Bonita Carlisle receives a Special Material writing credit
38	3	"To Masseur with Love"	Ted Bessell	Sam Simon	November 20, 1988	5W12	N/A
38	3	"The Bart Simpson Show"	N/A	Matt Groening	November 20, 1988	5W12	N/A
38	3	"Conjugal Visit"	Ted Bessell	Jay Kogen & Wallace Wolodarsky	November 20, 1988	5W12	N/A
38	3	"Closing"	Stuart Margolin	N/A	November 20, 1988	5W12	N/A
To Masseur with Love – Kay gets a massage. The Bart Simpson Show – When Homer decides "Itchy and Scratchy" is too violent to watch, Bart decides to put on his own show for Lisa and Maggie. Conjugal Visit – Prison penpals meet for the first time and have their first conjugal visit. Closing – Tracey apologizes to her neighbors for her dogs' barking and talks about her dog trainer, Billy. Song performed: "Slow Hand" Note: Tracey Ullman receives a Special Material writing credit
39	4	"Ginny vs. Roz"	Sam Simon	Marc Flanagan	November 27, 1988	5W13	N/A
39	4	"Stars Are Ours"	Ted Bessell	Story by : Craig Heller & Guy Shulman; Teleplay by : Marc Flanagan	November 27, 1988	5W13	N/A
39	4	"Punching Bag"	N/A	Matt Groening	November 27, 1988	5W13	N/A
39	4	"Dance Studio"	Sam Simon	Jay Kogen & Wallace Wolodarsky	November 27, 1988	5W13	N/A
39	4	"Closing"	Ted Bessell	N/A	November 27, 1988	5W13	N/A
Ginny vs. Roz – Ginny and her sister Roz decide who's going to care for their mother after their father's death. Stars Are Ours – Greg is having an existentialist crisis and Sara is concerned. Punching Bag – The Simpson kids play rough. Dance Studio – A police officer demands that a man claiming to be a dance instructor teach her how to dance. Closing – Tracey talks about Mabel's Australian nanny. Note: Tracey Ullman receives a Special Material writing credit
40	5	"Santa Baby"	Ted Bessell	Jay Kogen & Wallace Wolodarsky	December 18, 1988	5W14	6.2
40	5	"Simpson Xmas"	N/A	Matt Groening	December 18, 1988	5W14	6.2
40	5	"New Year's Eve"	Ted Bessell	Jay Kogen & Wallace Wolodarsky	December 18, 1988	5W14	6.2
40	5	"Closing"	Ted Bessell	N/A	December 18, 1988	5W14	6.2
Santa Baby – Tina has some fun with Santa. Simpson Xmas – Bart recites The Night Before Christmas. New Year's Eve – Three desperate women decide to do whatever it takes to get dates for New Year's Eve. Closing – Tracey wishes everyone a Merry Christmas, along with the cast and crew. Song performed: "Santa Baby" Note: Bonita Carlisle receives a Special Material writing credit
41	6	"Francesca's Autobiography"	Ted Bessell	Ken Estin & Heide Perlman	January 8, 1989	5W16	7.3
41	6	"Francesca's Autobiography: The Final Chapter"	Sam Simon	Ken Estin & Heide Perlman	January 8, 1989	5W16	7.3
Francesca writes her autobiography. Sketches: "Francesca's Choice", "Romantic Mommy", "Francesca's First Job", "Francesca – A Girl's Life" Note: This is a clip show. Producers acknowledge directors Stuart Margolin & Art Wolff, as well as writers Heide Perlman & Sam Simon for their contributions in the end credits
42	7	"Kay Babysits"	Ted Bessell	Jay Kogen & Wallace Wolodarsky	January 15, 1989	5W17	6.4
42	7	"The Krusty the Clown Show"	N/A	Matt Groening	January 15, 1989	5W17	6.4
42	7	"Check Please"	Ted Bessell	Bonita Carlisle	January 15, 1989	5W17	6.4
42	7	"Closing"	Ted Bessell	N/A	January 15, 1989	5W17	6.4
Kay Babysits – Kay is forced to babysit Mr. Leroy's daughter. The Krusty the Clown Show – Bart exposes Krusty. Check, Please – A man is forced to pick up the check. Closing – Juliet Sorci tells Tracey it's okay for her to tell people that she discovered her. Song performed: "Empty Chairs at Empty Tables" Note: Bonita Carlisle receives a Special Material writing credit
43	8	"Francesca's Task"	Sam Simon	Dick Blasucci & Marc Flanagan	January 29, 1989	5W18	6.2
43	8	"Bart the Hero"	N/A	Matt Groening	January 29, 1989	5W18	6.2
43	8	"The Nuclear Family"	Ted Bessell	Michael Sardo	January 29, 1989	5W18	6.2
43	8	"Closing"	Ted Bessell	N/A	January 29, 1989	5W18	6.2
Francesca's Task – Francesca waits until the last minute to finish her term paper. Bart the Hero – Bart captures the notorious candy robber. The Nuclear Family – The matriarch and head of a mom and pop nuclear weapons manufacturer is forced into retirement by her son. Closing – Tracey asks Doris Grau what it was like being in the Nuclear Family sketch. Song performed: "Back Stabbers" Note: Bonita Carlisle receives a Special Material writing credit
44	9	"Special Skills"	Ted Bessell	Marc Flanagan	February 5, 1989	5W19	5.8
44	9	"Bart's Little Fantasy"	N/A	Matt Groening	February 5, 1989	5W19	5.8
44	9	"Flesh and Desire"	Ted Bessell	Jay Kogen & Wallace Wolodarsky	February 5, 1989	5W19	5.8
44	9	"Heaven"	Ted Bessell	Jay Kogen & Wallace Wolodarsky	February 5, 1989	5W19	5.8
44	9	"Closing"	Ted Bessell	N/A	February 5, 1989	5W19	5.8
Special Skills – Three people who are hoping to become business executives are forced to compete for the position. Bart's Little Fantasy – Bart imagines a planet where the children are the parents and parents are the children. Flesh and Desire – David catches William eating meat. Heaven – Two astronauts take their relationship to new international space heights. Closing – Tracey brings out Janeen Rae Heller, who played the saw in the Special Skills sketch. Song performed: "Somewhere Over the Rainbow" Note: Bonita Carlisle receives a Special Material writing credit
45	10	"Francesca: A Physical Education"	Sam Simon	Marc Flanagan	February 12, 1989	5W20	6.9
45	10	"Scary Movie"	N/A	Matt Groening	February 12, 1989	5W20	6.9
45	10	"Someone to Watch Over Me"	Sam Simon	Ken Estin & Heide Perlman	February 12, 1989	5W20	6.9
45	10	"Closing"	Sam Simon	N/A	February 12, 1989	5W20	6.9
Francesca: A Physical Education – Francesca takes a stand in gym class. Scary Movie – The Simpson kids see a scary movie. Someone to Watch Over Me – Kay is forced to see a psychiatrist. Closing – Tracey says goodbye to Betty Thomas. Songs performed: "(What's So Funny 'Bout) Peace, Love, and Understanding", "Someone to Watch Over Me" Guest star: Betty Thomas Note: Bonita Carlisle receives a Special Material writing credit
46	11	"The Subway"	Ted Bessell	Marc Flanagan	February 19, 1989	5W21	6.4
46	11	"Home Hypnotism"	N/A	Matt Groening	February 19, 1989	5W21	6.4
46	11	"I Do, I Will"	Ted Bessell	Marc Flanagan	February 19, 1989	5W21	6.4
46	11	"Closing"	Ted Bessell	N/A	February 19, 1989	5W21	6.4
The Subway – Passengers are stuck in a subway car. Home Hypnotism – Homer and Marge hypnotize the Simpson kids into being good. I Do, I Will – Gary and Joanie decide to comprise. Closing – Tracey performs one final song with Rose and Alfie. Songs performed: "Sit Down, You're Rockin' the Boat", "Do Right Woman, Do Right Man" Guest stars: Rose Banks, Alfie Silas Note: Bonita Carlisle receives a Special Material writing credit
47	12	"Rock on the Block"	Sam Simon	Sam Simon	February 26, 1989	5W22	6.4
47	12	"Shoplifting"	N/A	Matt Groening	February 26, 1989	5W22	6.4
47	12	"The Height of Friendship"	Sam Simon	Jay Kogen & Wallace Wolodarsky	February 26, 1989	5W22	6.4
47	12	"The Orange Badge of Courage"	Sam Simon	Sam Simon	February 26, 1989	5W22	6.4
47	12	"Closing"	Sam Simon	N/A	February 26, 1989	5W22	6.4
Rock on the Block – A rock star auctions off his most prized possessions. Shoplifting – Bart is caught shoplifting. The Height of Friendship – Window cleaners fight over an affair. The Orange Badge of Courage – The Downeys play war games. Closing – Tracey and Tim Curry perform "I Do the Rock" together. Songs performed: "Lonely at the Top", "I Do the Rock" Guest star: Tim Curry Note: Bonita Carlisle receives a Special Material writing credit
48	13	"Goodbye Butchie"	Ted Bessell	Jay Kogen & Wallace Wolodarsky	March 12, 1989	5W23	6.9
48	13	"Echo Canyon"	N/A	Matt Groening	March 12, 1989	5W23	6.9
48	13	"The Handout"	Ted Bessell	Ellis Weiner	March 12, 1989	5W23	6.9
48	13	"Teamies"	Sam Simon	Ken Estin	March 12, 1989	5W23	6.9
48	13	"Closing"	Ted Bessell	N/A	March 12, 1989	5W23	6.9
Goodbye, Butchie – Summer Storm's dog Butchie dies. Echo Canyon – The Simpsons visit a canyon. The Handout – A group decides to give a homeless man some money after giving him the third degree. Teamies – A trio of race walkers discover that they're going to be competing against one another. Closing – Tracey announces that next week's guest stars will be from America's Most Wanted. Song performed: "Walk On By" Note: Bonita Carlisle receives a Special Material writing credit
49	14	"Occupied"	Ted Bessell	Harvey Miller	March 19, 1989	5W24	3.9
49	14	"Bathtime"	N/A	Matt Groening	March 19, 1989	5W24	3.9
49	14	"Mr. Right"	Sam Simon	Jay Kogen & Wallace Wolodarsky	March 19, 1989	5W24	3.9
49	14	"Closing"	Sam Simon	N/A	March 19, 1989	5W24	3.9
Occupied – Kiki attempts to join the mile high club after being dumped by her husband. Bathtime – Bart is forced to take a bath. Mr. Right – A couple is introduced to their friend's new beau who's a real dummy. Closing – Tracey brings out Dan Castellaneta. Song performed: "Crazy" Note: Jay Kogen receives a Special Material writing credit
50	15	"Stress Management"	Ted Bessell	Michael Sardo	March 26, 1989	5W25	5.6
50	15	"Bart's Nightmare"	N/A	Matt Groening	March 26, 1989	5W25	5.6
50	15	"Rudy Visits Omi"	Ted Bessell	Marc Flanagan	March 26, 1989	5W25	5.6
50	15	"Brick House"	Ted Bessell	Dan Castellaneta & Deb Lacusta	March 26, 1989	5W25	5.6
50	15	"Closing"	Ted Bessell	N/A	March 26, 1989	5W25	5.6
Stress Management – The Downeys take a stress management class. Bart's Nightmare – Bart has a nightmare after eating too many cookies. Rudy Visits Omi – A man visits his grandmother. Brick House – A prudish woman goes shopping for some sexy underwear. Closing – Tracey shows off her prosthetic chest. Song performed: "Brick House" Note: Bonita Carlisle receives a Special Material writing credit
51	16	"Kay: Trapped"	Ted Bessell	Jay Kogen & Wallace Wolodarsky	April 9, 1989	5W26	5.0
Kay is trapped in an elevator with a stranger. Sketches: "Kay's Old Love", "Kay's Last Stand", "Kay's Adventure", "Someone to Watch Over Me" Note: This is a clip show. Producers acknowledge directors Sam Simon & Art Wolff, as well as writers Dick Blasucci & Paul Flaherty, Ken Estin & Heide Perlman, Jay Kogen & Wallace Wolodarsky, and Ken Levine & David Isaacs, for their contributions in the end credits
52	17	"Tinker, Tailor, Soldier, Kay"	Ted Bessell	Michael Sardo	April 16, 1989	5W27	5.4
52	17	"Bart of the Jungle"	N/A	Matt Groening	April 16, 1989	5W27	5.4
52	17	"Sweet Dreams"	Ted Bessell	Bonita Carlisle	April 16, 1989	5W27	5.4
52	17	"Pumping Irony"	Ted Bessell	Jay Kogen & Wallace Wolodarsky	April 16, 1989	5W27	5.4
52	17	"Closing"	Ted Bessell	N/A	April 16, 1989	5W27	5.4
Tinker, Tailor, Soldier, Kay – Kay discovers that her boss is having an affair. Bart of the Jungle – The Simpson kids play outside. Sweet Dreams – Newlyweds Joanie and Gary have gone without sex for two nights in a row and Joanie is upset. Pumping Irony – The Downeys get pumped. Closing – Tracey responds to a letter written about her in the Los Angeles Times. Note: Bonita Carlisle receives a Special Material writing credit
53	18	"Maid Service"	Ted Bessell	Manny Basanese & Debra Korbel	April 23, 1989	5W28	5.9
53	18	"Family Therapy"	N/A	Matt Groening	April 23, 1989	5W28	5.9
53	18	"Code of Silence"	Ted Bessell	Michael Sardo	April 23, 1989	5W28	5.9
53	18	"Clowns D'Amore"	Ted Bessell	Jay Kogen & Wallace Wolodarsky	April 23, 1989	5W28	5.9
53	18	"Closing"	Sam Simon	N/A	April 23, 1989	5W28	5.9
Maid Service – Maria, a maid, discovers how her boss really feels about her. Family Therapy – The Simpsons try family therapy. Code of Silence – A woman runs into her old boyfriend who's now a Queen's Guard. Clowns D'Amore – Two professional clowns are uncomfortable not wearing their makeup and costumes. Closing – Tracey announces Sam McMurray's new baby daughter. Song performed: "Spread a Little Happiness" Note: Bonita Carlisle receives a Special Material writing credit
54	19	"The Wave Girls"	Ted Bessell	Heide Perlman & Sam Simon	April 30, 1989	5W29	6.8
54	19	"Maggie in Peril: Chapter One"	N/A	Matt Groening	April 30, 1989	5W29	6.8
54	19	"The Cure"	Ted Bessell	Jay Kogen & Wallace Wolodarsky	April 30, 1989	5W29	6.8
54	19	"D.U.I."	Ted Bessell	Jay Kogen & Wallace Wolodarsky	April 30, 1989	5W29	6.8
54	19	"Closing"	Ted Bessell	Michael Sardo	April 30, 1989	5W29	6.8
The Wave Girls – An aging cheerleader wants to continue with the squad. Maggie in Peril: Chapter One – Maggie goes after her ball and ends up in danger. The Cure – Dr. Gibson announces to his patient that she's cured. D.U.I. – An extremely complicated sobriety test. Closing – Tracey brings out the show's choreographer, Paula Abdul. Song performed: "(It's Just) The Way That You Love Me" Note: Bonita Carlisle received a Special Material writing credit
55	20	"All About Tammy Lee"	Ted Bessell	Dick Blasucci & Marc Flanagan	May 7, 1989	5W30	5.8
55	20	"Maggie in Peril: The Thrilling Conclusion"	N/A	Matt Groening	May 7, 1989	5W30	5.8
55	20	"Closing"	Ted Bessell	N/A	May 7, 1989	5W30	5.8
All About Tammy Lee – A troubled country-western star D.D.'s career is taken over by her much younger, very ambitious assistant Tammy Lee. Maggie in Peril: The Thrilling Conclusion – Maggie returns home safely, along with her ball, with the Simpsons none the wiser. Closing – The real violinists come out. Songs performed: "I'm Down to My Last Cigarette", "Rocky Top", "I Fall to Pieces" Note: Sam Simon receives a Special Material writing credit
56	21	"Psychiatric Hour"	Ted Bessell	Susan Gauthier	May 14, 1989	5W15	4.4
56	21	"T.V. Simpsons"	N/A	Matt Groening	May 14, 1989	5W15	4.4
56	21	"Summer Goes Shopping"	Ted Bessell	Heide Perlman	May 14, 1989	5W15	4.4
56	21	"Who Now, Brown Cow?"	Ted Bessell	Michael Sardo	May 14, 1989	5W15	4.4
56	21	"Closing"	Ted Bessell	N/A	May 14, 1989	5W15	4.4
Psychiatric Hour – Who's the shrink and who's the patient? T.V. Simpsons – Bart's kite gets caught in the Simpsons' television antenna. Summer Goes Shopping – Summer Storm accidentally shoplifts a bag of dog food. Who Now, Brown Cow? – A cow dancing duo have creative differences. Closing – Tracey brings out Andrea Martin. Guest star: Andrea Martin Note: Bonita Carlisle receives a Special Material writing credit
57	22	"Best of the Tracey Ullman Show: Season 3"	Ted Bessell	N/A	May 21, 1989	TBA	6.8
Tracey opens the show by welcoming viewers into her home. Sketches: "D.U.I.", "Mr. Right", "Family Therapy", "9 Minutes and 52 Seconds Over Tokyo", "Conjugal Visit", "Special Skills" Note: Bonita Carlisle receives a Special Material writing credit

=== Season 4 (1989–90) ===
No. overall	No. in season	Title	Directed by	Written by	Original release date	Prod. code	Rating/share (households)
58	1	"...And God Created Tillman"	Ted Bessell	Heide Perlman & Sam Simon	September 10, 1989	7W01	8.7
58	1	"A Rare Talent"	Ted Bessell	Marc Flanagan	September 10, 1989	7W01	8.7
58	1	"Closing"	Ted Bessell	N/A	September 10, 1989	7W01	8.7
...And God Created Tillman – Ginny meets Lawrence's new girlfriend, Mae (Isabella Rosellini). A Rare Talent – A woman who can fly auditions for the role of Peter Pan. Closing – Tracey reveals how she was able to fly. Song performed: "Never Never Land" Guest star: Isabella Rosellini Note: Bonita Carlisle receives a Special Material writing credit
59	2	"My Date With Il Duce"	Ted Bessell	Paul Haggis	October 1, 1989	7W02	7.2
59	2	"The Wrong Message"	Ted Bessell	Michael J. Weithorn	October 1, 1989	7W02	7.2
59	2	"The Thrill Is Gone"	Ted Bessell	Jay Kogen & Wallace Wolodarsky	October 1, 1989	7W02	7.2
59	2	"Closing"	Ted Bessell	N/A	October 1, 1989	7W02	7.2
My Date With Il Duce – On the eve of her wedding, a woman's grandmother recounts her affair with Benito Mussolini. The Wrong Message – A woman leaves an embarrassing message on a man's answering machine. The Thrill is Gone – Brenda is dumped on a bungee jump. Closing – Tracey and Isabelli Rosellini compare green cards. Song performed: "Since I Fell for You" Guest star: Isabella Rosellini Note: Bonita Carlisle receives a Special Material writing credit
60	3	"Da Me La Mano"	Ted Bessell	Lisa-Maria Radano	October 8, 1989	7W03	8.0
60	3	"Needle in a Haystack"	Ted Bessell	Cameron Crowe	October 8, 1989	7W03	8.0
60	3	"Closing"	Ted Bessell	N/A	October 8, 1989	7W03	8.0
Da Me La Mano – The truth about Richie comes out during a manicure. Needle in a Haystack – A woman goes on a date with a doctor who is obsessed with Elvis Presley. Closing – Tracey brings out Martin Short. Guest star: Martin Short Note: Bonita Carlisle receives a Special Material writing credit
61	4	"The Final Polka"	Ted Bessell	Marc Flanagan	October 22, 1989	7W04	7.0
61	4	"Sermon on the Mound"	Ted Bessell	Michael J. Weithorn	October 22, 1989	7W04	7.0
61	4	"My Baby"	Ted Bessell	Marc Flanagan	October 22, 1989	7W04	7.0
61	4	"Closing"	Ted Bessell	N/A	October 22, 1989	7W04	7.0
The Final Polka – A man rethinks an arranged marriage. Sermon on the Mound – A strange conference on the pitcher's mound. My Baby – Three overdue women go into labor at the same time. Closing – Tracey talks to Marilu Henner about playing a pregnant woman in the My Baby sketch. Songs performed: "Do You Love Me", "Be My Baby" Guest star: Marilu Henner Note: Jay Kogen receives a Special Material writing credit
62	5	"The Co-Op"	Ted Bessell	Jay Kogen & Wallace Wolodarsky	October 29, 1989	7W05	7.0
62	5	"The Man Who Got Away"	Ted Bessell	Dinah Kirgo	October 29, 1989	7W05	7.0
62	5	"Parallel Existence (My Better Whole)"	Ted Bessell	Dinah Kirgo	October 29, 1989	7W05	7.0
62	5	"Closing"	Ted Bessell	N/A	October 29, 1989	7W05	7.0
The Co-Op – David and William are worried that their application to rent an apartment won't be approved because they're a gay couple. The Man Who Got Away – A successful entrepreneur interviews Dr. Gibson before agreeing to become his patient. Parallel Existence (My Better Whole) – A woman is visited by her more outgoing and successful self from a parallel universe. Closing – Tracey doesn't want to be in the show's bumpers. Song performed: "Down for Double" Note: Bonita Carlisle receives a Special Material writing credit
63	6	"Two Time Losers"	Ted Bessell	Bonita Carlisle	November 5, 1989	7W06	5.4
63	6	"The Closing"	Ted Bessell	Marilyn Suzanne Miller	November 5, 1989	7W06	5.4
63	6	"Closing"	Ted Bessell	N/A	November 5, 1989	7W06	5.4
Two Time Losers – Gulliver Dark sues his manager. The Gate – A woman visits Steven Spielberg. Closing – Steven Spielberg reveals the reason he did the show. Songs performed: "The Man That Got Away", "It's a Small World" Guest star: Steven Spielberg Note: Bonita Carlisle receives a Special Material writing credit
64	7	"The Crisis"	Ted Bessell	Heide Perlman	November 12, 1989	7W07	6.0
64	7	"The Baltimore Stoops"	Ted Bessell	Marc Flanagan	November 12, 1989	7W07	6.0
64	7	"Closing"	Ted Bessell	N/A	November 12, 1989	7W07	6.0
The Crisis – Joanie dyes her hair without consulting Gary. The Baltimore Stoops – A woman can't accept her father's new girlfriend. Closing – Tracey and Michael Tucker record two alternate endings to go out, depending on the result of the upcoming Emmy Awards. (Note: Tracey won.) Guest star: Michael Tucker Note: Bonita Carlisle received a Special Material writing credit
65	8	"Buy Stuff Possessed"	Ted Bessell	Howard Gewirtz	November 19, 1989	7W08	6.7
65	8	"The Holland Tunnel of Love"	Ted Bessell	Marc Flanagan & James P. Kocot	November 19, 1989	7W08	6.7
65	8	"Closing"	Ted Bessell	N/A	November 19, 1989	7W08	6.7
By Stuff Possessed – A woman joins Shopaholics Anonymous. The Holland Tunnel of Love – A man brings his girlfriend home to meet his Italian-American parents. Closing – Tracey jams with Carole King, Billy Preston, and Clarence Clemons. Songs performed: "Saved", "I Feel the Earth Move", "Will It Go Round In Circles" Guest stars: Fran Drescher, Carole King Note: Bonita Carlisle receives a Special Material writing credit
66	9	"Power Play"	Ted Bessell	Ian Praiser	November 26, 1989	7W09	6.1
66	9	"Break Up"	Ted Bessell	David Mirkin	November 26, 1989	7W09	6.1
66	9	"Something Cool"	Ted Bessell	Marc Flanagan	November 26, 1989	7W09	6.1
Power Play – A child actor demands better material. Break Up – The Downeys break up. Something Cool – A woman enters a bar and orders something cool. Song performed: "Something Cool"
67	10	"Look Back in Anxiety"	Ted Bessell	Jay Kogen & Wallace Wolodarsky	December 10, 1989	7W10	6.3
Dr. Gibson pitches a book based on some of his cases. Sketches: "Fear", "The Little Neurotic From Down Under", "Gotta Dance", "Dr. Gibson's Mentor" Note: This is a clip show. Producers acknowledge directors Stuart Margolin & Art Wolff, as well as writers Jay Kogen & Wallace Wolodarsky and Heide Perlman & Sam Simon for their contributions in the end credits
68	11	"Kay's Gift"	Sam Simon	Jay Kogen & Wallace Wolodarsky	December 17, 1989	7W11	12.7
68	11	"Merry Catnip"	Sam Simon	Dinah Kirgo	December 17, 1989	7W11	12.7
68	11	"Two Lost Souls"	Sam Simon	Dinah Kirgo	December 17, 1989	7W11	12.7
68	11	"Simpson Xmas"	N/A	Matt Groening	December 17, 1989	7W11	12.7
68	11	"Closing"	Sam Simon	N/A	December 17, 1989	7W11	12.7
Kay's Gift – Kay gets upset when her boss, Mr. Leroy, doesn't appreciate her Christmas gift. Merry Catnip – Ann B. Cooper spends Christmas alone with her cats. Two Lost Souls – A woman wakes up to find that she's married to her boss's son. Simpson Xmas – Bart recites The Night Before Christmas. Closing – Tracey, along with the children of the cast and crew, sing a Christmas carol. Songs performed: "Silent Night", "Have Yourself a Merry Little Christmas", "Jingle Bells" Guest star: Keanu Reeves Note: Bonita Carlisle receives a Special Material writing credit
69	12	"Ginny's Second Chance"	Ted Bessell	Jay Kogen & Wallace Wolodarsky	January 7, 1990	7W12	8.3
69	12	"Maria and the Mister"	Sam Simon	Dinah Kirgo	January 7, 1990	7W12	8.3
69	12	"Closing"	Sam Simon	N/A	January 7, 1990	7W12	8.3
Ginny's Second Chance – Ginny dates a plastic surgeon. Maria and the Mister – Maria comforts the master of the house. Closing – Kelsey sings. Songs performed: "Evergreen", "Eternal Flame" Guest star: Kelsey Grammer Note: Jay Kogen receives a Special Material writing credit
70	13	"I'm Dating a Corporate Lawyer"	Ted Bessell	Marilyn Suzanne Miller	January 14, 1990	7W13	6.4
70	13	"Ginny Nocturne"	Ted Bessell	Marc Flanagan & Michael J. Weithorn	January 14, 1990	7W13	6.4
70	13	"Dawg Day Afternoon'"	Ted Bessell	Bonita Carlisle	January 14, 1990	7W13	6.4
70	13	"Closing"	Ted Bessell	N/A	January 14, 1990	7W13	6.4
I'm Dating a Corporate Lawyer – Sara reveals how she met Greg. Ginny Nocturne – Ginny bares her soul to the pool man. Dawg Day Afternoon – A Dawg Pound fan is given an ultimatum. Closing – Tracey shows off her 1970s panty line. Guest star: Martin Short Note: Bonita Carlisle receives a Special Material writing credit
71	14	"Due Diligence"	Ted Bessell	Marc Flanagan	February 4, 1990	7W14	5.9
71	14	"You Call That a Dress?"	Ted Bessell	Lisa-Maria Radano	February 4, 1990	7W14	5.9
71	14	"Closing"	Ted Bessell	N/A	February 4, 1990	7W14	5.9
Due Diligence – An old director has to get an actress to agree to do his picture. You Call That a Dress? – A woman is visited by her dead father. Closing – Tracey brings out her old headmaster, Mr. Ron Harding. Guest star: Mel Brooks Note: Bonita Carlisle receives a Special Material writing credit
72	15	"The Word"	Sam Simon	Heide Perlman	February 11, 1990	7W15	6.1
72	15	"The Fee"	Ted Bessell	Heide Perlman	February 11, 1990	7W15	6.1
72	15	"The Sell"	Sam Simon	Jay Kogen & Wallace Wolodarsky	February 11, 1990	7W15	6.1
72	15	"Closing"	Sam Simon	N/A	February 11, 1990	7W15	6.1
The Word – Francesca demands a newspaper retraction. The Fee – Brenda becomes enraged over Dr. Gibson increasing his fee. The Sell – A woman is determined to sell her idea for a television show. Closing – Tracey asks Bill Pullman about his next movie. Guest star: Bill Pullman Note: Bonita Carlisle receives a Special Material writing credit
73	16	"Creative Differences"	Ted Bessell	Dinah Kirgo	February 18, 1990	7W16	6.8
73	16	"Jinx Haber Revisited"	Ted Bessell	Marilyn Suzanne Miller	February 18, 1990	7W16	6.8
73	16	"Closing"	Ted Bessell	Marc Flanagan	February 18, 1990	7W16	6.8
73	16	"Tea"	Ted Bessell	N/A	February 18, 1990	7W16	6.8
Creative Differences – Sandra Decker auditions for a role alongside her nemeses. Jinx Haber Revisited – Jinx reveals that she can fly to her date. Tea – Two tea tasters fall in love. Closing – Tracey asks Glenn Close about her audition song. Song performed: "Isn't It Romantic?" Guest star: Glenn Close Note: Bonita Carlisle receives a Special Material writing credit
74	17	"Ginny Eats Escrow"	Sam Simon	Heide Perlman & Sam Simon	February 25, 1990	7W17	8.4
74	17	"I Hate Paris"	Sam Simon	Ian Praiser	February 25, 1990	7W17	8.4
74	17	"Closing"	Sam Simon	N/A	February 25, 1990	7W17	8.4
Ginny Eats Escrow – Ginny tries selling a house to Lawrence and Mae and witnesses their first fight. I Hate Paris – William becomes depressed when David decides to go on a business trip to Paris without him. Closing – Tracey brings out Isabella Rossellini and reveals that she sent her to a spa. Song performed: "Stand by Your Man" Guest star: Isabella Rossellini Note: Bonita Carlisle receives a Special Material writing credit
75	18	"The Dream is Over"	Ted Bessell	Dinah Kirgo	March 4, 1990	7W18	5.9
Sara Downey is having her kitchen remodeled. Sketches: "The Orange Badge of Courage", "Pumping Irony", "The Affair", "Break Up" Note: This is a clip show. Producers acknowledge directors Ted Bessell, Sam Simon, Art Wolff, as well as writers Marc Flanagan, Jay Kogen & Wallace Wolodarsky, David Mirkin, and Sam Simon for their contributions in the end credits
76	19	"High School Sweethearts"	Ted Bessell	Mike Short	April 7, 1990	7W19	5.6
76	19	"Dear Taxpayer"	Sam Simon	Jeff Baron	April 7, 1990	7W19	5.6
76	19	"Me, Myself & I"	Sam Simon	Jay Kogen & Wallace Wolodarsky	April 7, 1990	7W19	5.6
76	19	"Closing"	Sam Simon	N/A	April 7, 1990	7W19	5.6
High School Sweethearts – A reunion of two high school sweethearts from the Class of '29. Dear Taxpayer – A woman working for the IRS handles her son's audit. Me, Myself & I – Two very self-involved actors don't even realize that they've spent the entire day together. Closing – Tracey reveals that there's a sandwich named after her at Stage Deli. Note: Bonita Carlisle receives a Special Material writing credit
77	20	"The Hormonal Conversion"	Sam Simon	Marc Flanagan	April 21, 1990	7W21	5.8
77	20	"Who Is He?"	Sam Simon	Lisa-Maria Radano	April 21, 1990	7W21	5.8
77	20	"Face the Music"	Ted Bessell	Dan Castellaneta & Joesph Malone & Deb Lacusta	April 21, 1990	7W21	5.8
77	20	"Closing"	Sam Simon	N/A	April 21, 1990	7W21	5.8
The Hormonal Conversion – Dr. Gibson's female mentor returns after having transitioned into Hans. Who Is He? – A neighborly encounter. Face the Music – A dancer leaving a Broadway show asks its nasty leading lady for one final dance. Closing – Tracey reveals her true self. Note: Bonita Carlisle receives a Special Material writing credit
78	21	"Her First Grownup"	Ted Bessell	Heide Perlman	April 28, 1990	7W22	5.4
78	21	"Daisy's Decline"	Ted Bessell	Dinah Kirgo	April 28, 1990	7W22	5.4
78	21	"Closing"	Ted Bessell	N/A	April 28, 1990	7W22	5.4
Her First Grownup – Francesca flirts with the stereo installer. Daisy's Decline – A successful restaurant owner fires the chef and lives to regret it. Closing – Tracey brings out Ken Daly. Note: Bonita Carlisle receives a Special Material writing credit
79	22	"Under the Bounding Main"	Ted Bessell	Dick Blasucci & Marc Flanagan	May 5, 1990	7W23	6.1
79	22	"Arms Control"	Ted Bessell	Marc Flanagan & James P. Kocot	May 5, 1990	7W23	6.1
79	22	"Closing"	Ted Bessell	N/A	May 5, 1990	7W23	6.1
Under the Bounding Main – Marty and Angel Tish at sea, along with their nemesis, Gulliver Dark. Arms Control – Rosaria shoots an intruder. Closing – Dan Castellaneta talks about doing a production of The King and I at age 12. Songs performed: "Land of a Thousand Dances", "Sexual Healing", "Tom Dooley" Note: Bonita Carlisle receives a Special Material writing credit
80	23	"Modern Maturity"	Ted Bessell	Marc Flanagan	May 12, 1990	7W20	5.9
80	23	"Spies"	Ted Bessell	Jay Kogen & Wallace Wolodarsky	May 12, 1990	7W20	5.9
80	23	"Baseball Wives"	Art Wolff	Jay Kogen & Wallace Wolodarsky	May 12, 1990	7W20	5.9
80	23	"Closing"	Ted Bessell	N/A	May 12, 1990	7W20	5.9
Modern Maturity – Roz cares for Leonard. Spies – A Russian spy waits for an American with classified material. Baseball Wives – A woman wants to be more than a baseball wife. Closing – The reason for Tracey's current hairstyle. Note: Tracey Ullman receives a Special Material writing credit
81	24	"Best of the Tracey Ullman Show: Season 4"	Ted Bessell & Sam Simon	N/A	May 26, 1990	7W24	3.8
A 90-minute best of special. Sketches: "Tea", "Power Play", "Two Time Losers", "...And God Created Tillman", "Something Cool", "Creative Differences", "I Hate Paris", "Due Diligence". Tracey closes the show by announcing that this is their final season and the cast gives the final "Go home!" – "But I don't want to!" Julie, Dan, Sam, and Joseph hug her.
