= Annie Thurman =

American actress

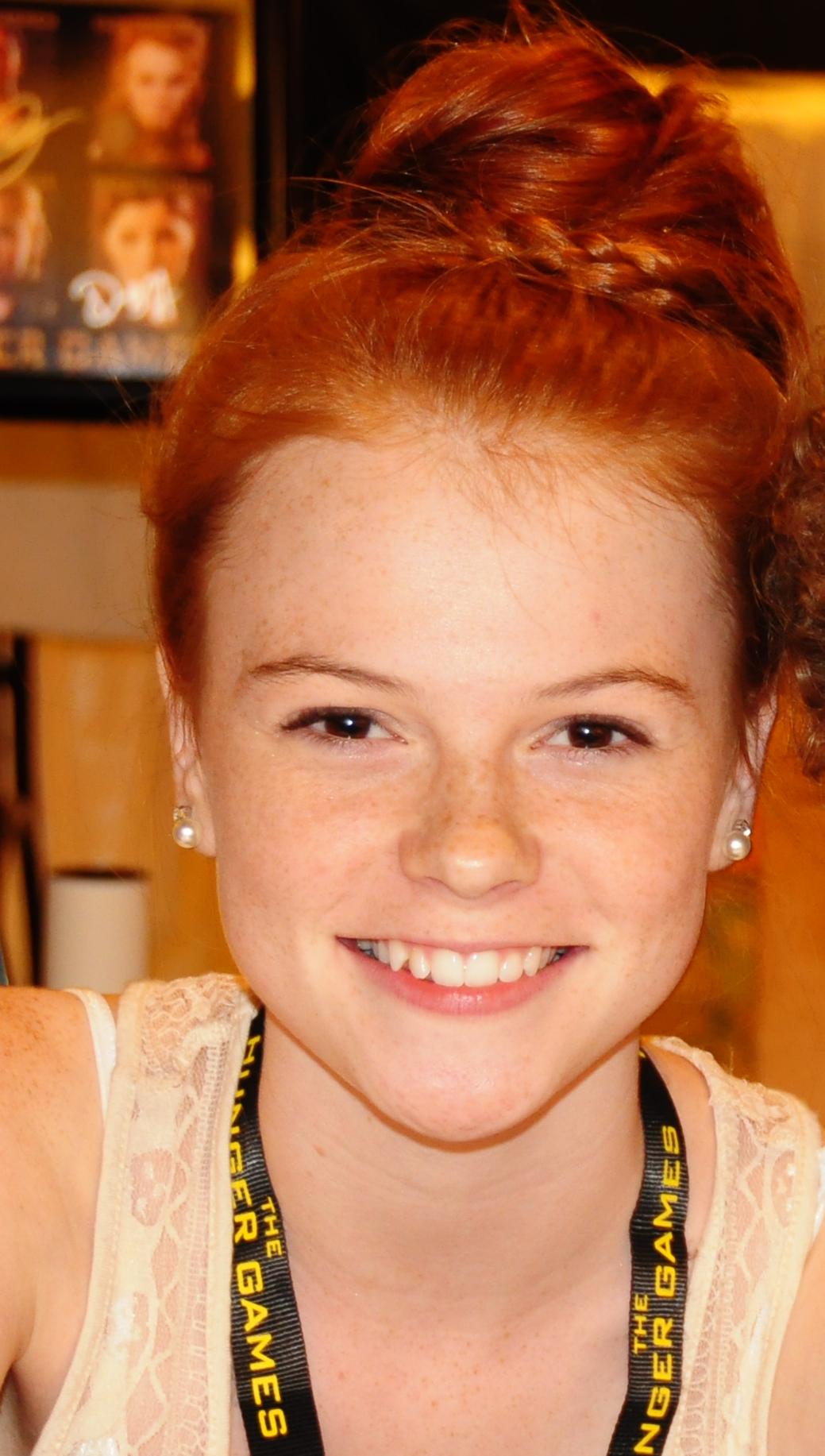
- Thurman at 2012 Florida Supercon
- Born: Annie Nicole Thurman; November 14, 1996 (age 29); Nashville, Tennessee, U.S.
- Occupation: Actress
- Years active: 2010–present

Annie Nicole Thurman (born November 14, 1996) is an American actress known for playing Sophie Barliss in the TNT drama Proof and Shelly Jessop in the 2013 science fiction horror film Dark Skies.

== Life and career ==
Thurman had originally auditioned for the role of Clove in The Hunger Games, but ultimately lost the role to Isabelle Fuhrman. She appeared as District 9 female Tribute.

In Proof, she has a recurring role as Sophie Barliss, the daughter of Dr. Carolyn "Cat" Tyler, played by Jennifer Beals.

She is the face of national commercials including Oscar Mayer and Little Debbie Snacks. She studied acting at workshops, where she was scouted by her current manager and agent. Perhaps her most recognized minor role is on 911, where she played Evelyn, the gifted young cello player killed in a traffic collision with the fire truck on the episode titled Malfunction. Thurman is an avid animal lover and has two rabbits, two dogs, and four cats. Thurman's hobbies include playing the ukulele, volleyball, and riding horses.

== Filmography ==
Film and television
Year	Title	Role	Notes
2010	Nov-Dec #249	Drew	Video short
2011	Falls the Shadow	Cora	
2012	The Hunger Games	Female Tribute District 9	
2013	Dark Skies	Shelly Jessop	
2013	Santa Switch	Sally Ryebeck	TV film
2015	Proof	Sophie Barliss	Regular role
2018	Chicago P.D.	Addie Sumter	
2018-2021	All American	Gabby	3 episodes
2019	9-1-1	Evelyn	
2020	Stargirl	Mary Kramer	
