= The Tracey Ullman Show =

1987–1990 American comedy television show

- Genre: Sketch comedy; Variety show
- Created by: James L. Brooks; Jerry Belson; Ken Estin; Heide Perlman
- Starring: Tracey Ullman; Julie Kavner; Dan Castellaneta; Sam McMurray; Joseph Malone; Anna Levine (1988–89)
- Theme music composer: George Clinton
- Opening theme: "You're Thinking Right" performed by George Clinton
- Ending theme: "You're Thinking Right" (instrumental)
- Composer: Richard Gibbs
- Country of origin: United States
- Original language: English
- No. of seasons: 4
- No. of episodes: 81 (+ 1 special) (list of episodes)

Production
- Executive producers: James L. Brooks; Jerry Belson; Ken Estin; Heide Perlman; Sam Simon
- Producers: Ted Bessell; Dinah Kirgo; Richard Sakai
- Camera setup: Multi-camera
- Running time: 22–24 minutes (excluding commercials)
- Production companies: Gracie Films; 20th Century Fox Television; Klasky Csupo (animation production)

Original release
- Network: Fox
- Release: April 5, 1987 – May 26, 1990

Related
- The Simpsons; Tracey Takes On...

The Tracey Ullman Show is an American television sketch comedy variety show starring Tracey Ullman. It debuted on Fox on April 5, 1987, as the network's second original primetime series, following Married... with Children, and ran for four seasons and 81 episodes until May 26, 1990. It was produced by Gracie Films in association with 20th Century Fox Television. The show blends sketch comedy with musical numbers and dance routines, choreographed by Paula Abdul, along with animated shorts. The show was conceived by executive producer James L. Brooks. Brooks was determined to come up with a format that best suited his multitalented star. He likened the show to producing three television pilots a week.

The show produced a series of shorts featuring the Simpson family, which were later spun off into the longest-running American scripted primetime television series, The Simpsons. The Tracey Ullman Show was the first Fox primetime show to win an Emmy Award, winning a total of ten over the course of its run. Ullman was the first British woman to be offered her own television sketch show in the United States.

Rolling Stone ranked The Tracey Ullman Show as the 25th-best sketch comedy show in its "40 Greatest Sketch-Comedy TV Shows of All Time" list.

== Premise ==
Tracey Ullman plays an array of original comedic characters alongside her supporting cast in multiple sketches. The show also features musical performances, dance numbers, and animated segments.

== Cast and crew ==
The cast of The Tracey Ullman Show in 1988,(L–R): Julie Kavner, Joseph Malone, Tracey Ullman, Sam McMurray, Dan Castellaneta

=== Cast ===
- Tracey Ullman
- Julie Kavner
- Dan Castellaneta
- Sam McMurray
- Joseph Malone
- Anna Levine (Season 3)

==== Voice acting ====
- Nancy Cartwright (The Simpsons, Seasons 1–3)
- Julie Payne (Dr. N!Godatu, Season 1)
- Yeardley Smith (The Simpsons, Seasons 1–3)

=== Directors ===
- Ted Bessell
- Stuart Margolin
- Penny Marshall
- Sam Simon
- Art Wolff

=== Writers ===
- Jeff Baron
- Manny Basanese
- Jerry Belson
- Tony Berg
- Dick Blasucci
- Rob Bragin
- Holly Holmberg Brooks
- James L. Brooks
- Dan Castellaneta
- Cameron Crowe
- Ken Estin
- Paul Flaherty
- Marc Flanagan
- Kim Fuller
- Susan Gauthier
- Howard Gewirtz
- Matt Groening (The Simpsons shorts only)
- Paul Haggis
- Craig Heller
- Susan Herring
- David Isaacs
- James P. Kocot
- Jay Kogen
- Debra Korbel
- Deb Lacusta
- Jane Lancellotti
- Michael Leeson
- Ken Levine
- Joseph Malone
- Harvey Miller
- Marilyn Suzanne Miller
- David Mirkin
- Heide Perlman
- Ian Praiser
- Lisa-Maria Radano
- Michael Sardo
- Richard Sakai
- J.C. Scott
- Mike Short
- Guy Shulman
- Sam Simon
- Doug Steckler
- Miriam Trogdon
- Tracey Ullman
- Ellis Weiner
- Michael J. Weithorn
- Wallace Wolodarsky

=== Guest stars ===
- Paula Abdul
- Judith Barsi
- Mel Brooks
- Michael Cerveris
- George Clinton
- Clarence Clemons
- Glenn Close
- Tim Curry
- Fran Drescher
- Doris Grau
- Kelsey Grammer
- Matt Groening
- Marilu Henner
- Carole King
- Cheech Marin
- Andrea Martin
- Kellie Martin
- Steve Martin
- Maureen McGovern
- Frank Patterson
- Matthew Perry
- Jim Piddock
- Billy Preston
- Bill Pullman
- Keanu Reeves
- Cesar Romero
- Isabella Rossellini
- Nick Rutherford
- Martin Short
- Steven Spielberg
- Betty Thomas
- Michael Tucker

== Episodes ==
Season	Segments	Episodes	Originally released	
Season	Segments	Episodes	First released	Last released
1	76	13	April 5, 1987	July 19, 1987
2	86	22	September 27, 1987	May 8, 1988
Special			October 30, 1988	
3	86	22	November 6, 1988	May 21, 1989
4	77	24	September 10, 1989	May 26, 1990

== Background and development ==
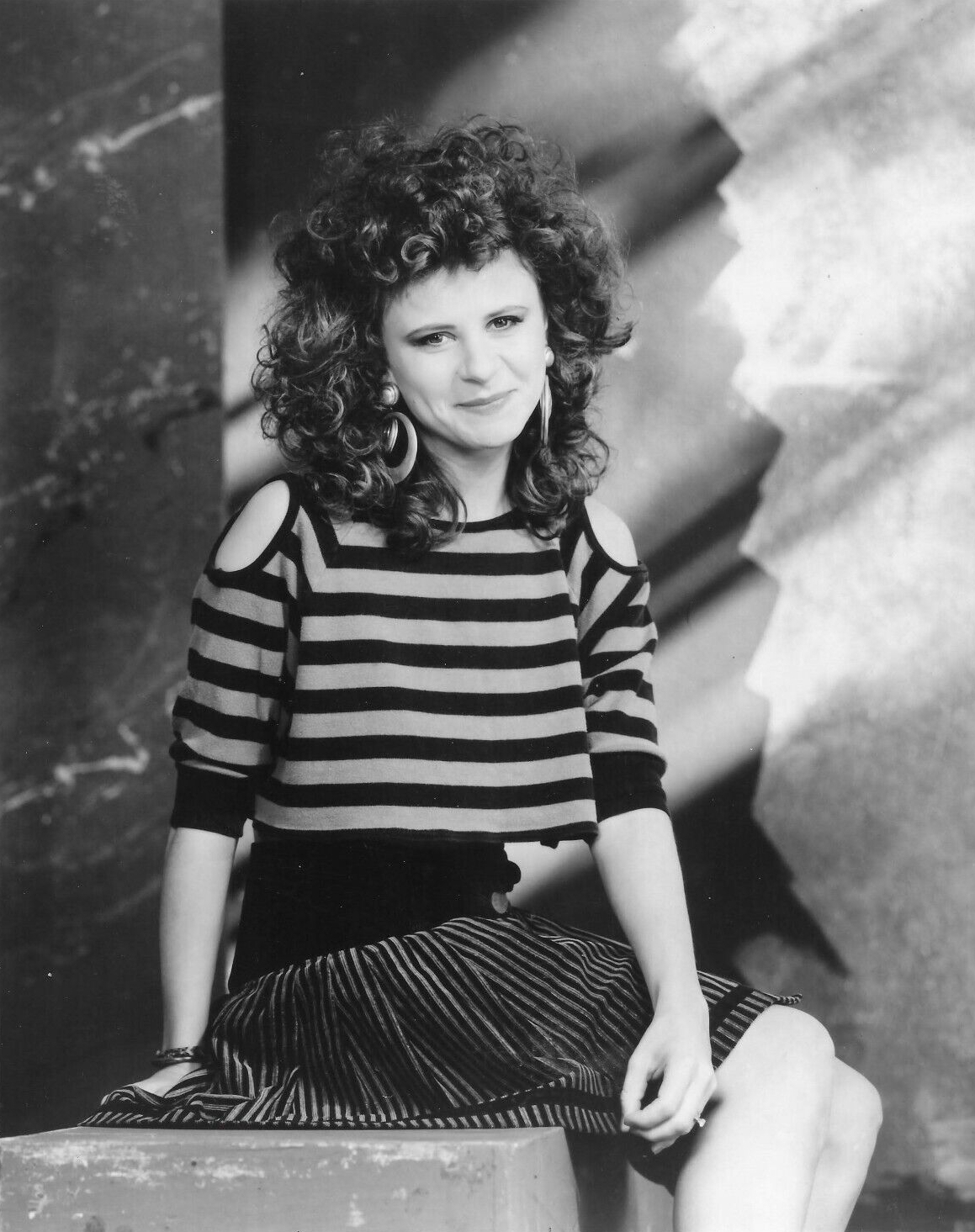
Tracey Ullman in 1987

British actress, comedian, singer, and former dancer Tracey Ullman was encouraged to break into American television by her husband, British television producer Allan McKeown. McKeown was looking to station himself in the United States. Ullman, who was a household name in her native Britain, had already made the rounds in the United States promoting her film and music careers in the early to mid-1980s. Unlike British audiences, Americans were unaware of her comedy background, aside from her humorous appearances on The Tonight Show Starring Johnny Carson and Late Night with David Letterman. She already had three successful British comedy shows under her belt, garnering numerous awards and accolades. "I didn't believe there was anything above Webster standard [in America]. I was wrong." Her British agent put together a compilation tape of her work and began circulating it around Hollywood. It landed in the lap of Craig Kellem, vice president of comedy at Universal Television. "I could not believe my eyes. It was just about the most extraordinary piece of material I'd seen in a long time." He wanted production on a series to begin immediately for her. Saturday Night Live scribe and creator of CBS's Square Pegs, Anne Beatts, was hired to write the pilot. While Universal liked the script, Ullman disliked the changes that senior executives wanted to make. Recalling the project: "We'd just hit on an idea, then some white-haired executive – very, very important – would come in from the racetrack and say, 'I don't like that idea. I think Tracey should be a caring person. I think there should be a kid in this. Now, I'm just pitching here. I don't know if this is funny. But I think Tracey should love this kid and maybe there's a moment where she tells the kid something about life.' And I'd say, 'Look – I don't want to work with little kids being cute who I eventually adopt.'"

Ullman's new agent, Martha Luttrell, sent her tape to James L. Brooks, who had a deal at Fox. Fox, dubbed America's "fourth network", was looking to create its own brand of original primetime programming. Brooks watched the tape in astonishment. "I saw original talent, and how often does that happen to you?" "I started showing [her work] to people like you'd show home movies." "I was just startled by the size of the talent. I got chills." Ullman explained her situation at CBS to him and revealed that she was pregnant. Brooks convinced her to exit the deal, promising that once she had the baby, they would develop a show together. He felt a variety show was the best—and most obvious—format for her. "Why would you do something with Tracey playing a single character on TV when her talent requires variety? You can't categorize Tracey, so it's silly to come up with a show that attempted to," stated Brooks. "Variety hadn't been done for some time and we wanted to do a show that would allow me to do the things I like to do and can do," said Ullman in 1987.

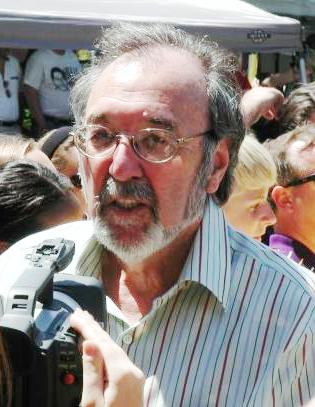
James L. Brooks decided to return to television after viewing a compilation of Ullman's work.

To ensure that she was well-versed in American comedy, Brooks began sending her tapes of American sitcoms and variety shows to watch and study. Ullman also began visiting and spending time at the Museum of Television & Radio.

"After I made Plenty, I thought it was sad that everyone left London to go home to Hollywood. Thought I'd join 'em. [...] I thought of myself as a Peter Sellers-type. No one does American accents better than him. Look at Dr. Strangelove and Lolita." As one critic noted, Sellers had American director Stanley Kubrick as his visionary and Ullman would get American television and film director James L. Brooks, the man behind such hit television shows as The Mary Tyler Moore Show, Taxi, and Rhoda, as well as the films Terms of Endearment and Broadcast News. "I came to America in 1985 and James made me stay. If I had a mentor like him in Great Britain, I would've stayed there."

The key to getting Ullman ready for primetime was "assembling the right people," according to Brooks. He, along with co-executive producers Jerry Belson, Ken Estin, and Heide Perlman, went on a retreat in Northern California to brainstorm the show’s direction. "We wanted to tell a story, to be involved in character. We did not want to do spoofs or takeoffs. You define a show by what you don't want to do as well as by what you do. We rushed on the air and have been finding the show while we're on the air. You lose a lot of sleep that way, but it's great. Now, we have five or six characters that we repeat from time to time, and new ones are candidates for repetition." When it came to Fox, Brooks stated, "It was helpful for us to do the show without any preconceived context. Not only were we new, but so was Fox. There was no notion of something to fit into." Fox was reportedly backing the show with nearly US$1 million per broadcast. The series landed an initial 26-episode commitment, a deal unheard of for a television comedy; Fox then ordered a further 30 episodes in October 1987. Describing the show proved difficult; creator Ken Estin dubbed it a "skitcom".

A wide array of original and diverse characters was created for Ullman to portray. Extensive makeup, wigs, prosthetic teeth, and body padding were used, sometimes rendering her completely unrecognizable. One original character, created by Ullman back in England, was uprooted for the show: the long-suffering British spinster, Kay Clark. Kay was based on a real woman who worked at a bank in the Midlands; Ullman kept in touch with her over the phone long after moving from Britain to the United States. "Kay" would ask her questions about Hollywood, and Ullman began mimicking the voice she heard on the other end of the line to her dog. (Note: Episode: "Tracey Ullman Backstage") Ullman had been obsessed with the concept of spinsters since childhood. (Note: Stated in Tracey Ullman: Live and Exposed) Despite their frequent chats, she never actually saw the real "Kay" and preferred to imagine what she looked like.

The Tracey Ullman Show's costume designer, Jane Ruhm, suggested a drooping bust and cellulite-covered hips for the character. Ruhm even created a costume complete with "hydraulic pistons" to achieve the desired effect. "Tracey is really, really interested in what her characters look like," Ruhm revealed. "She is constantly collecting pictures of people and coming to me saying, 'I want to do a character dressed like this!' I file that in my memory, and then when we get a script, I'll ask, 'That character you wanted to do—can we use it for this?' She'll say, 'Yeah!' and off we go." Reflecting on the character's success, Ullman remarked, "It's a real thrill to me that someone like Kay can be famous in America."

For other characters, Ullman drew inspiration from people she knew personally or celebrities she had observed and encountered. "I based one character on Maggie Smith, which the script supervisor suggested. I remember her in California Suite saying, 'Well, I don't care if I didn't win the fucking Oscar.' It sounded good. It made me laugh, and then I felt that I could do the character."

Ullman based the character Francesca on a neighbor—an awkward teenage girl who would visit her in the kitchen and stand sheepishly in the corner. "I wanted to portray painful adolescence, but not an adolescent that was spoiled," Ullman explained. "I'd seen so many that were just, 'Like, I really want to go to the movies, and you're totally stupid.' I didn't want to play a horrible kid."

Ullman believed in evolving her characters so they did not stagnate. "You have to advance the characters ... you have to find new situations for them," she noted. "They have to do something, or say something, or grow as people. And they have to be unusual." (Note: Episode: "Tracey Ullman Backstage") Much like Kay, another character created and performed by Ullman—first for the British series Three of a Kind and later for The Tracey Ullman Show—was the impoverished housewife Betty Tomlinson.

The producers decided to incorporate animated segments after struggling to find a cohesive way to transition between sketches. Initially, they considered using talking animals—specifically a bear. "I don’t know why we were so into a bear. Nobody was in love with the idea, but we just couldn’t think of how else to do it," explained Ken Estin. "In most variety shows, the sketches were so short that transitions weren't a concern. Nobody had ever really done this before."

The turning point came when Richard Sakai gave Estin a drawing from Matt Groening's Life in Hell. Estin recalled, "It was very different. It was smart, unusual, and drawn poorly, which I thought added to the charm. I asked, 'What if we have this guy do little cartoons between the scenes? Is that possible? Does anybody like that idea?' They all liked it. That is how Matt became our guy."

Brooks was already familiar with Groening's work as well. Polly Platt, the producer of his film Terms of Endearment, had gifted him a Groening cartoon titled "Success and Failure in Hollywood". It was actually Platt who first suggested that Brooks develop a special based on Groening's characters.

Heide Perlman initially recruited another artist, M. K. Brown of National Lampoon, to create animated segments. Brown agreed to produce a cartoon centered on a female psychiatrist named Dr. N!Godatu. Meanwhile, negotiations with Matt Groening stalled when Fox demanded ownership of the merchandising rights for Life in Hell, leading Groening to pass on the project. Estin prompted Sakai to ask Groening if he had any other characters he would be willing to let Fox merchandise. Groening claimed he did and promised to send them over for review. "Two, maybe three days after I spoke to Richard, Matt sends us a drawing of the Simpsons—almost exactly as they are now," Estin recalled. "Everybody said, 'Fine. That's fine. We like them.' And Matt made his deal with Fox."

The producers eventually determined that Groening's work was a better fit for the show than Brown's, and her segments were phased out. Although Ullman was initially approached to voice a member of the Simpson family, it proved unfeasible since she already spent up to three hours a day in the makeup chair. Her fellow cast member, Julie Kavner, agreed to take the role instead. Groening occasionally approached Ullman to provide guest voices for the shorts, but she consistently declined due to her heavy workload.

Early reports regarding the show's premise indicated that it would center on Ullman starring in a 12-minute "playlet", accompanied by a shorter sketch, musical performances, and a weekly lecture from Harry Shearer. The network bypassed a pilot, instead granting a 26-episode commitment to be produced by James L. Brooks alongside several top writers from Cheers. Ultimately, however, Shearer's planned weekly lecture never materialized.

When it came time to promote the show, Fox initially arranged appearances only in Los Angeles and New York. However, in 1988, Ullman insisted on touring Middle America. "I want to see America a bit, I really do," she explained. "I've only been to LA and New York, and they make very disparaging remarks about Middle America there. Network executives always talk about Des Moines, Iowa, as if to say, 'Would they like this in Des Moines?' They think you only want The Facts of Life and She's the Sheriff—that you only want that type of television—and I don't believe that’s true. There’s no intelligence or truth in shows like that. I think you want something a bit smarter." She continued, "We take pictures everywhere on this tour; we're taping people's voices. I'm taking it all in, and it’s great. A journalist once called me a 'social satirist,' and I thought, 'That sounds quite intelligent, doesn't it?' So that’s what I’m doing—meeting people from a social satirist’s point of view."

Whenever Ullman struggled with a specific voice or accent, she turned to the telephone directory. "If I wanted to do someone from Brooklyn, I would call the library in Brooklyn and listen to their voice, taping them surreptitiously so they didn't know."

== Production ==
=== Casting ===
Dan Castellaneta, a relatively unknown at the time, was asked to audition for the show after Ullman spotted him at Chicago's The Second City. His portrayal of a blind man who wants to be a comedian reportedly brought her to tears instead of making her laugh. Ullman went so far as to tell producers she would not do the show unless Castellaneta was hired.

To star in The Tracey Ullman Show, Castellaneta turned down the opportunity to appear in the short-lived sitcom version of the film Nothing in Common—a film in which he had also appeared. "Tracey always says, 'You're so lucky, Dan. You can always go back to Nothing in Common,'" Castellaneta joked in a 1988 interview.

Describing the show's philosophy, Castellaneta stated, "Essentially, what dictates it is that there are no parodies; even if it's an unusual situation, Tracey and [executive producer] Jim Brooks try to keep things as believable and real. You've got to be honest." He remained true to his Second City training when approaching comedy: "Don't ever do what's expected. Always try to find a different way of doing something... Always play to the top of your intelligence. A character should be as smart as you are. And if the character isn't as smart as you are, you can't make a comment about it; you can't make fun of the character." Castellaneta felt that audiences could see right through a character that wasn't portrayed honestly and believed the show's viewers were both demanding and intelligent. "They're people who like something different... they're certainly an intelligent audience. And they're an audience that isn't as easily offended as other people might be."

Actress Julie Kavner had previously co-starred in Rhoda, Brooks's spin-off of The Mary Tyler Moore Show starring Valerie Harper. Kavner played Harper’s younger, socially awkward sister, Brenda—a role that earned her an Emmy Award. Kavner was at the top of the list of people Brooks wanted for the new show. Brooks said of her: "When somebody's intrinsically funny—you know, in-their-bones funny—they never have to work at [being funny], so they're free to work on other things. We were all nuts about her work. She was the person we most wanted to work with Tracey."

Actor Sam McMurray originally auditioned for a guest spot playing William, the partner of the father of 13-year-old "Valley Girl" Francesca (Ullman). McMurray recalled his casting: "The first Francesca sketch, they said, 'Play the guy not so gay.' And I said, 'I disagree.' I had a big mouth then—still do. I said, 'I think he's more the woman. I think he's more out there.' So I read it big, and they cast me. It was just a one-off, and then we were on hiatus. I had a friend who used to write, a guy named Marc Flanagan, who was on the show as a staffer. He called me up and said, 'Did they call your agent?' I said, 'No, why?' He said, 'They want to make you a regular.'"

McMurray did not become a full-fledged cast member until the sixth episode and initially felt uncomfortable with the show's atmosphere. He noted, "The social dynamic of the show is an odd one. I spoke with [executive producer] Jim Brooks about this later and I said, 'You know, it's like we're all square pegs, aren't we?' And he said, 'Yeah,' and that the same thing occurred on The Mary Tyler Moore Show. Everybody was from a different discipline—somebody had been from sitcoms, somebody came from the stage, and somebody had been a stand-up comic—and yet whatever dynamic was forged from it, it's singular and it works."

The last addition to the cast was dancer Joseph Malone. He was originally hired for a guest spot, playing a police officer who dances with a potential jumper on a ledge; however, his performance was so well-received that he was cast as a series regular. Malone had previously worked with Michael Jackson, Lily Tomlin, and Barbara Mandrell.

With Malone's hiring, the core ensemble was complete. During the 1987–1988 season (the show's second), Julie Kavner asked to be released from her contract to focus on her film career. At the time, Kavner was living in New York while The Tracey Ullman Show was taped in Los Angeles. Actress Anna Levine was subsequently cast to fill the void, while Kavner transitioned to making special appearances. Kavner eventually returned as a permanent cast member in Season 3, and Levine remained with the production, albeit in a diminished role.

=== Writing ===
James L. Brooks knew the importance of good writers and quickly assembled a team for the show, most notably Heide Perlman and Ken Estin of Cheers fame. Perlman and Estin would also serve as executive producers. Joining them was comedy writer Jerry Belson, who had an extensive career writing for television comedies such as The Dick Van Dyke Show and The Odd Couple (the latter of which he co-developed with his writing partner, Garry Marshall). Belson was the writer Ullman warmed to immediately; in an interview with The Nerdist Podcast, she recalled him saying, "Leave her alone, Jim, she's tired." She noted, "He was one of those funny writers [who], if you said that you didn't like a joke in the room, he'd say, 'What is this, Nazi Russia?'" When they won an Emmy, Belson's response was, "This is my first Emmy in color. Sam Simon, like Estin, had written for Taxi (co-created by Brooks) and also served as an executive producer for the show. Brooks discovered writer Marc Flanagan after watching a piece that he wrote performed by Meryl Streep and Kevin Kline at a benefit. Brooks asked to speak to Flanagan and kept him in mind as he began assembling the staff. SCTV writers Dick Blasucci and Paul Flaherty were hired to write and co-produce as well.

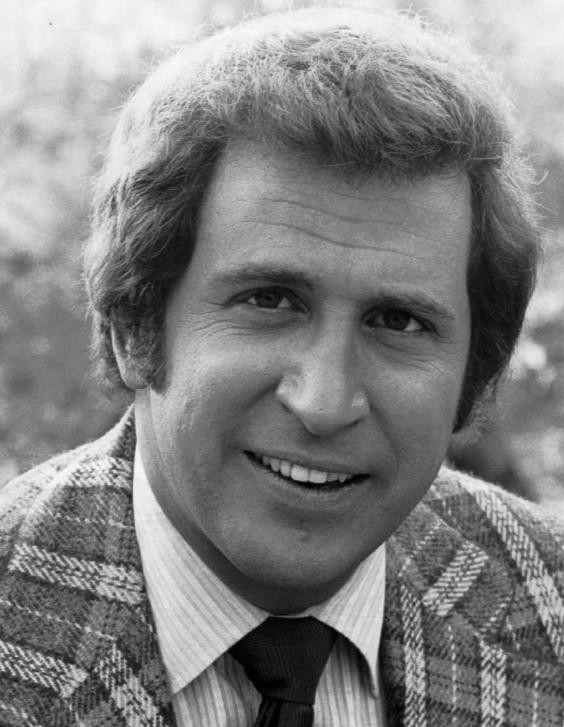
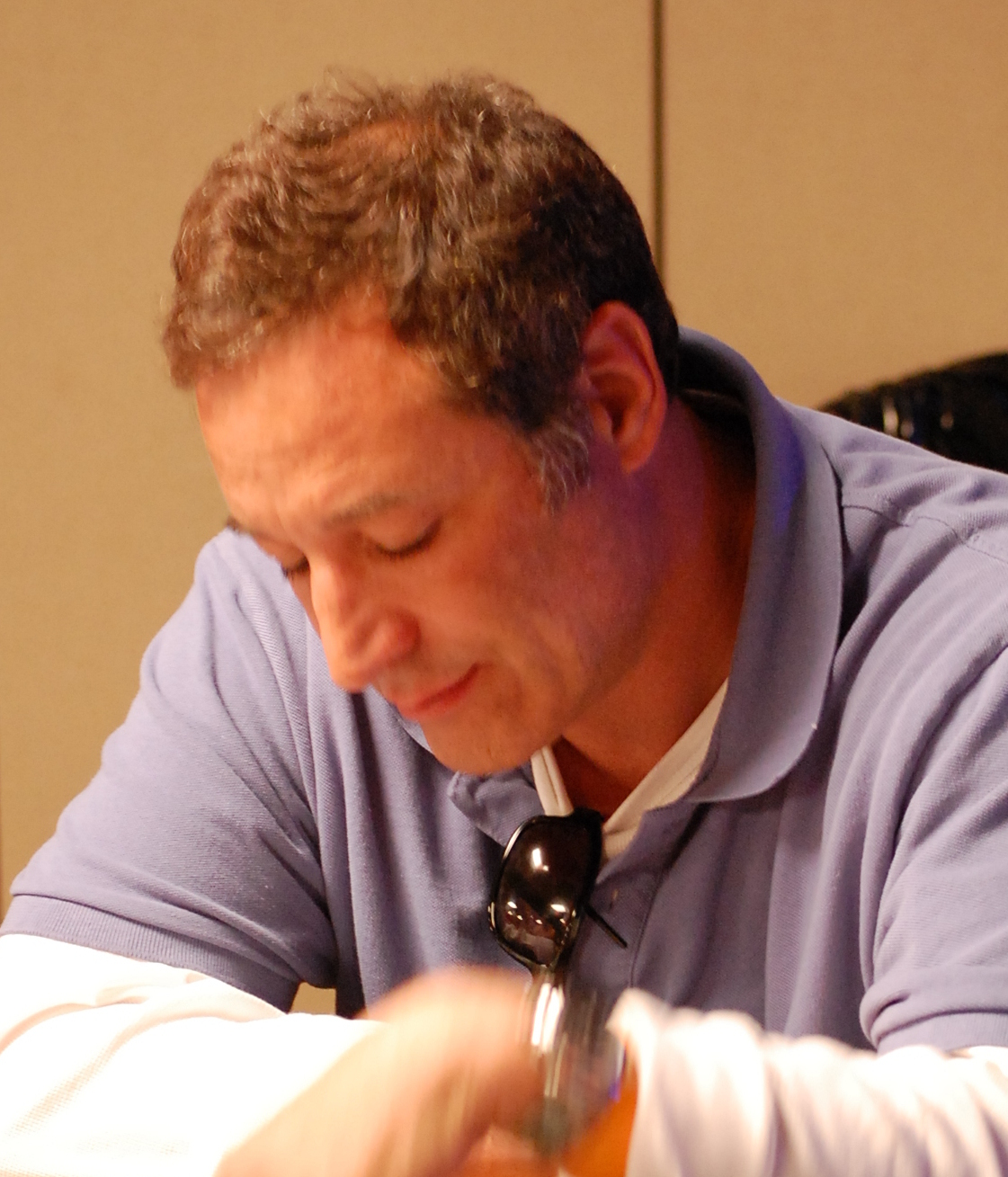
Ted Bessell (left) and Sam Simon (right) directed many of the show's episodes.

For each show, a table read would take place on Monday mornings in the presence of the writers and producers. It wasn't unusual for rewrites to go on past midnight; what worked in the writers' room would sometimes fall flat once in the hands of the actors. The best readings were the result of numerous rewrites. "I love cracking a run-through," said Ullman in 1989. "It's like a drug. If I can get them looking at me and respecting me, and thinking, 'She's done it!'—it's the best feeling."

But she knew that the only performance that truly mattered was the one recorded in front of a live studio audience. "You just gotta pray you hit that happy, energetic mood on Friday." The cast would usually rehearse under the guidance of director Ted Bessell. Around 3:30 pm each day, writers and producers, led by Brooks and Belson, would arrive for a run-through. They would observe, shout out suggestions, make additions and subtractions, and work out any kinks in the production. The show would then be ready to tape by Friday at 7:00 pm. One writer frequently credited on the show, Bonita Carlisle, was in actuality a nom de plume chosen by the writers' room, indicating that the writing had been a group effort. Guest stars such as Steve Martin and Mel Brooks got heavily involved in the writing of their sketches.

While the Fox network was quite permissive regarding the material it allowed on the air, by 1989, following controversy over an episode of Married... with Children, the network's Standards and Practices department began closely monitoring the show's scripts. One sketch, featuring a nun (played by Ullman) and a priest performing last rites, was pulled mid-production. Producers were given the option to either water down the skit or scrap it entirely. Ullman had no problem with the piece, and Brooks responded: "They're smart enough to know that they can't have a bland network that responds to every pressure and be successful... If we really believe a piece should be broadcast, then we will take a stand. We do care about doing characters accurately and having them take a comic view of life, but when censorship interferes with that, we've got to scream."

=== Format ===
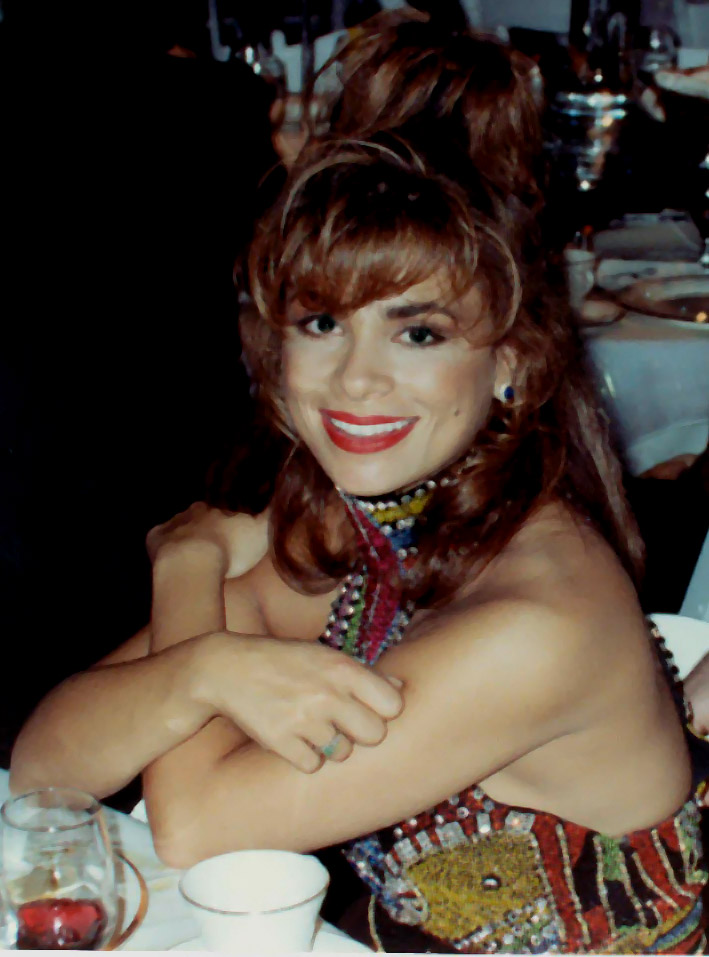
Paula Abdul won an Emmy Award for her work choreographing the show's dance numbers.

A typical episode of The Tracey Ullman Show consists of two or three sketches (or playlets) featuring Ullman playing an array of characters, along with her supporting cast: Julie Kavner, Dan Castellaneta, Sam McMurray, Joseph Malone, and in season three, Anna Levine. The final sketch of each episode usually includes a musical or dance number performed solely by Ullman or with the rest of the cast. Paula Abdul was responsible for choreographing all of the show's dance routines. Interstitial cartoon shorts, or "bumpers" ("Dr. N!Godatu" and "The Simpsons"), were featured before and after each commercial break.

The show's producers toyed with the format during the show's first season. A variety act was added and then scrapped by the third episode. Ullman began opening the show as herself by episode five; this was dropped altogether by season three in favor of an elaborate opening title sequence.

The final segment of all four seasons has Ullman, clad in a pink terrycloth bathrobe, delivering a closing monologue to the studio audience before shouting her signature catchphrase, "Go home!"

=== Opening title sequence ===
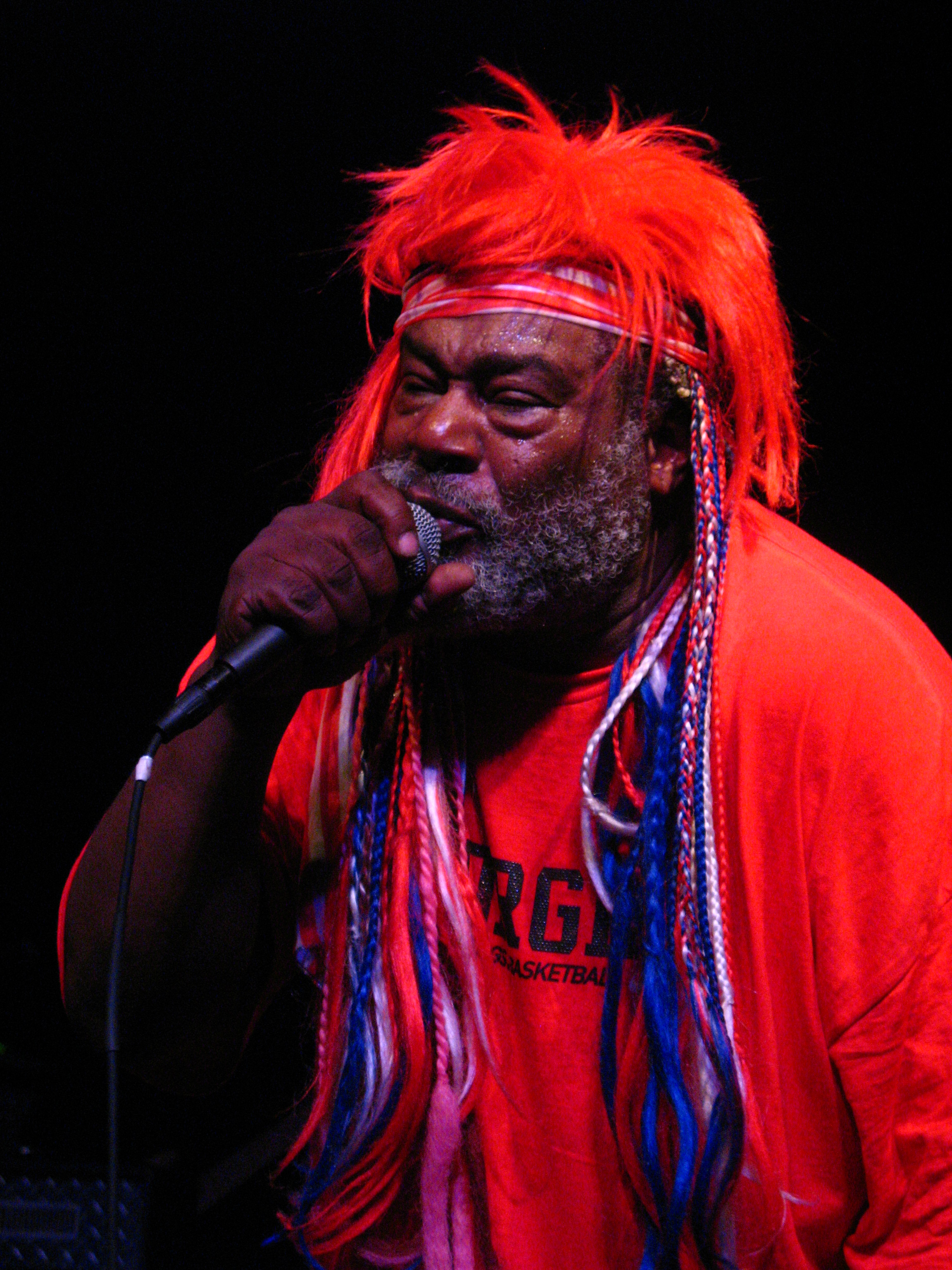
Funk musician George Clinton wrote and performed the show's theme song.

George Clinton was hired to write and perform the show's funk-infused theme song, "You're Thinking Right." Brooks also hired the animation and graphic-design company Klasky Csupo to design the show's title sequence; it would become the studio's big break. In addition to handling the show's opening, they produced the show's animated bumpers. In seasons one and two, the opening title sequence followed a brief introduction by Ullman to the studio audience.

For season three, however, the opening was scrapped and replaced with a live-action farce: Ullman pulls up to the 20th Century Fox studio lot in her car and hits a pedestrian. She attempts CPR in front of onlookers and revives the victim before rushing into the studio. There, she meets George Clinton; a staffer tries to get her opinion on a costume, and Paula Abdul attempts to go over choreography with her. Next, she visits the makeup room and greets her fellow castmates—including the Simpson family. She then looks at a pushpin board featuring stills of the week's sketches (presented as Polaroid photos) along with their titles. Season four returned to a title sequence similar to those of the first two seasons.

=== Ending ===
After four seasons, Ullman decided to end the show, stating that she was "constantly challenged and happily tortured by a unique group of people". She also thanked Fox "for letting somebody no one ever heard of do a show on a network that didn't exist". Brooks stated that The Tracey Ullman Show was "the hardest work any of us ever did, and we would have continued forever if she had wanted us to ... I'm just glad I appreciated it as it was happening and not just in retrospect ... Tracey is one of the most talented people alive." The show, which earned Fox its first Emmy Award, received a total of 33 nominations, winning 10.

Brooks didn't mince words when it was announced that Fox chairman Barry Diller was stepping down in 1992: "I thought The Tracey Ullman Show should have stayed on as long as she wanted to do it." Diller had been dragging his feet in renewing the show; tired of waiting, Ullman decided to pull the plug herself. When Ullman and the show won at the 1990 Primetime Emmy Awards, The Los Angeles Times wrote, "Tracey Ullman gets last laugh." Later, Ullman admitted that she would have liked an additional year to try out all the characters she wanted to play. She was proud, though, of what they achieved: "no compromises, no giving up, always wanting the best."

== Recurring characters ==
Some of the original characters portrayed by Ullman

Over the course of four seasons, Ullman played upwards of 100 characters; some were repeated, but not on a weekly basis. The show's supporting cast also played a variety of characters, usually opposite Ullman's, but in some instances without her. The following is a list of recurring characters performed by Tracey Ullman, Dan Castellaneta, Julie Kavner, and Sam McMurray. They are listed in order of appearance.

The Downeys

Played by Tracey Ullman and Dan Castellaneta

Sara and Greg Downey are two yuppies who care for their son, Max (Nick Rutherford), only when they absolutely have to.

Kay Clark

Played by Tracey Ullman

Originally from England, Kay works in Rhode Island for a paper-products distribution company. She's always the target of her co-workers' (and even her boss's) practical jokes. Kay takes care of her invalid mother, whom she frequently talks to on the phone from work.

Dr. Alexander Gibson

Played by Dan Castellaneta

A psychiatrist who analyzes many of Ullman's characters (e.g., Kay Clark, Brenda, Kiki Howard-Smith).

Brenda

Played by Tracey Ullman

A neurotic and ditzy valley girl and a patient of Dr. Alexander Gibson.

Francesca McDowell

Played by Tracey Ullman

A 14-year-old girl who is being raised by her father David (Dan Castellaneta) and his partner William (Sam McMurray).

David McDowell and William

Played by Dan Castellaneta and Sam McMurray

A gay couple who are raising David's daughter, Francesca, from a previous marriage. William usually sides with Francesca when she gets into trouble.

Sandra Decker

Played by Tracey Ullman

A faded Oscar-winning actress from the Golden Age of Hollywood.

Tina and Meg

Played by Tracey Ullman and Julie Kavner

Tina (Ullman) and Meg (Kavner) are best friends and United States postal workers.

Kiki Howard-Smith

Played by Tracey Ullman

An Australian professional golfer.

Ginny Tillman

Played by Tracey Ullman

Ginny is a bitter divorcée whose husband is Dr. Lawrence Tillman (Dan Castellaneta), a Beverly Hills proctologist. Lawrence goes on to remarry Mae (Isabella Rossellini).

Summer Storm

Played by Tracey Ullman

A burnt out hippie disc jockey.

Gulliver Dark

Played by Sam McMurray

A lounge singer, nicknamed "The Velvet Bulge". Gulliver's fans, consisting mainly of middle-aged women, become "Dark Ladies" once they've watched him perform in person 1,000 times or more, and have given him gifts equal to 10% of their income. (Note: Episode: "Kay's Adventure") The character went on to appear in The Simpsons, voiced by both Sam McMurray and George Balmaseda.

Angel and Marty Tish

Played by Tracey Ullman and Dan Castellaneta

Angel and Marty are a husband-and-wife entertainment duo who dub themselves "America's Sweethearts".

Margaret/Hans Neeman

Played by Tracey Ullman

Psychiatrist and mentor to Dr. Alexander Gibson. Margaret reunites with her former student, Dr. Gibson, as a patient, and admits to having been a fraud. (Note: Episode: "Dr. Gibson's Mentor") She reappears in a later sketch after having transitioned into Hans. (Note: Episode: "The Hormonal Conversion")

Roz and Leonard

Played by Julie Kavner and Sam McMurray

Ginny Tillman's sister, Roz (Kavner), who is married to the perpetually unenthusiastic Leonard (McMurray), cares for their ailing mother. (Note: Episode: "Ginny vs. Roz")

Gigi

Played by Tracey Ullman

A woman who is put through the paces no matter where she goes (e.g., a job interview where she is given 60 seconds to come up with an elaborate tap dance routine, (Note: Episode: "Special Skills") and a therapy session where she is forced to figure out who's the therapist and who's a patient (Note: Episode: "Psychiatric Hour")).

The Sours

Played by Sam McMurray and Tracey Ullman

Gary and Joanie Sours are a newlywed couple.

Maria

Played by Tracey Ullman

A maid.

Jinx Haber

Played by Tracey Ullman

A woman who can fly.

Ann B. Cooper

Played by Tracey Ullman

An eccentric cat lady who is on the co-op apartment's board of directors and is responsible for getting the McDowells' (David and William) application approved. (Note: Episode: "The Co-op")

Rosaria and Big Tony Manetti

Played by Tracey Ullman and Robert Costanzo

Rosaria and her husband, Big Tony, are an Italian-American couple who live in Jersey City. They constantly argue with one another.

Miranda Kenton

Played by Tracey Ullman

A narcissistic Hollywood actress.

== Animated segments ==
The Tracey Ullman Show regularly featured short animated interstitials in its first three seasons.

=== Dr. N!Godatu ===
"Dr. N!Godatu" was a series of animated shorts created by M.K. Brown and animated by Klasky-Csupo. It was seen during season one only and was the first cartoon featured on the show. The shorts followed the somewhat surreal life of Dr. Janice N!Godatu, who calmly and cheerfully addressed the camera as she detailed her latest misadventure. The character was voiced by Julie Payne.

The feature appeared in the first two episodes, then alternated more or less every other week with the "Simpsons" shorts (see below). After appearing six times, "Dr. N!Godatu" was dropped at the conclusion of the first season. Two additional "Dr. N!Godatu" cartoons that were prepared for the show never aired.

=== The Simpsons ===
The Simpson family as they originally appeared in shorts from The Tracey Ullman Show, making their television debut in 1987

The Simpson family debuted as animated shorts on The Tracey Ullman Show, beginning with episode three of the first season. The shorts were originally presented on an occasional basis, alternating episodes with "Dr. N!Godatu". However, the reaction to the Simpsons shorts was very positive, and after appearing seven times during season one, the feature was quickly promoted to full-time status, appearing in almost every episode of seasons two and three before being spun off into a half-hour series. These shorts, also called "bumpers", aired before and after commercial breaks during the first and second seasons of the show. They eventually had their own full segments between the live-action segments during season three. Except for a repeat airing of the short "Simpson Xmas", they did not appear in the fourth and final season of The Tracey Ullman Show, as they had their own half-hour TV series by then.

All of them were written by Matt Groening and animated at Klasky-Csupo by a team of animators consisting of David Silverman, Wes Archer, and Bill Kopp. The Tracey Ullman Show cast members Dan Castellaneta and Julie Kavner provided the voices of Homer and Marge Simpson, respectively. In the beginning, the drawings appeared very crude, because the animators were more or less tracing over Groening's storyboard; however, as the series developed, so did the designs and layouts of the characters and the "Simpsons drawing style" was ultimately conceived. At first, they just established the basics: clothes, hair, and distinctive features. This style evolved even more throughout the first few seasons of The Simpsons, and would later be used on Futurama and Disenchantment, which were also created by Groening.

== Reception ==
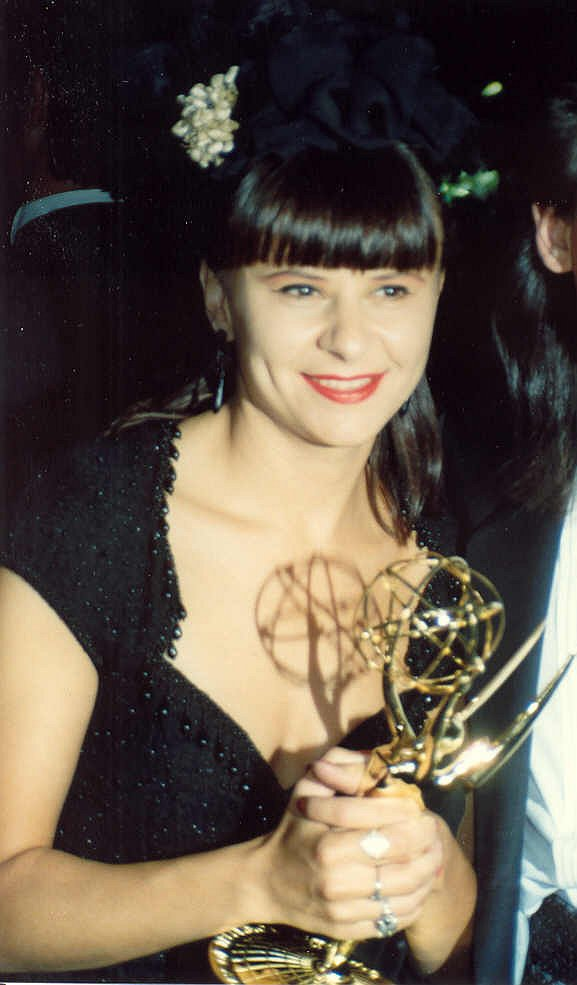
Ullman at the 41st Primetime Emmy Awards on September 17, 1989

=== Critical response ===
While the show was a critical darling, it was never a ratings juggernaut; although none of the early Fox network primetime shows generated a significant return (Fox did not crack the top 30 in the Nielsen ratings until 1990 with The Simpsons). On the show's ratings, Fox president Jamie Kellner was quoted in 1988 as saying, "We're too new new to be discouraged by ratings [...] It's true that it's harder to discover Tracey on Fox than on NBC." As critic Howard Rosenberg of The Los Angeles Times and The Washington Post pointed out, though, it was probably easier for her to survive, as the show she was producing was probably too "rule-bending" for NBC to be interested in, in the first place.

The show faced practical obstacles reaching viewers, one of which was the network broadcasting via a UHF signal in many areas. Ullman was personally critical of Fox messing with the show's timeslot, something network chairman Barry Diller later conceded. "I think there was real anger about the shifting time a lot, and that was legitimate. Networks do many things that are not necessarily in the interests of a particular show, and those things are not always smart. We had a very large audience for a very special show-but it wasn't large enough. Certain things take time. As the world speeds up, the rhythm of this show will become consistent with the rhythm of the audience. But it might take 10 years. I think the 80-something shows they did will be like The Honeymooners. I don't know when. But it's going to be pure, driven gold. We expect to get every nickel back. Plus, plus, plus." "It should've been on Sunday night. I think a great lineup would've been The Simpsons followed by Tracey, on Sunday night.", said Matt Groening in 1991. Despite its issues with the ratings, the show retained a devoted fan base and became a cult hit right up until the end. It also helped the Fox network gain credibility within the industry. Married... with Children, the series that launched the same night as the Ullman show, was mired in controversy and soon became branded low-brow humor.

=== Accolades ===
The show won a total of 10 Primetime Emmy Awards including Outstanding Variety, Music or Comedy Program in 1989 and 1990, and Outstanding Individual Performance in a Variety or Music Program in 1990. Also in 1989, choreographer Paula Abdul won the Primetime Emmy Award for Outstanding Choreography for her work on the show.

== Distribution ==
=== International ===
When The Tracey Ullman Show first appeared on British television, the BBC aired the first seven episodes unedited. The broadcaster then decided to cut six minutes from the show, specifically the Simpsons shorts. "The BBC said the only thing they didn't like about the show was those weird little animated characters and suggested maybe they could get rid of them because they would never catch on," Ullman later recalled. Despite their aversion to the cartoon shorts, she attempted to convince the broadcaster to buy the rights to The Simpsons television series, saying that it would be a mistake not to. Sky ended up buying the show. When the last batch of episodes were screened in 1991, the episodes were aired in full. The Tracey Ullman Show aired on BBC Two in the UK, Network 10 in Australia, and TVNZ in New Zealand.

=== Syndication ===
Reruns of the show appeared on Lifetime and Comedy Central throughout the 1990s in the United States.

== Home media ==
As of April 2025, The Tracey Ullman Show has never been commercially released through any home media platform. In a 2017 interview, Tracey Ullman theorized that music clearance issues may be to blame. (Note: Stated by Tracey Ullman in Laugh.ly The Backstory interview, October 2017.) A selection of the Simpsons shorts were released from 1997 through 1999 on The Simpsons VHS home video releases. The first Simpsons short called "Good Night" was included as a special feature on The Simpsons: The Complete First Season DVD box set released on September 25, 2001. The sketch "Due Diligence" featuring actor-comedian Mel Brooks was released as an extra on The Incredible Mel Brooks: An Irresistible Collection of Unhinged Comedy DVD in 2012.
