= Proof (2015 TV series) =

- Genre: Drama; Supernatural fiction
- Created by: Rob Bragin
- Starring: Jennifer Beals; David Sutcliffe; Edi Gathegi; Callum Blue; Caroline Kaplan; Annie Thurman; Joe Morton; Matthew Modine
- Country of origin: United States
- Original language: English
- No. of seasons: 1
- No. of episodes: 10

Production
- Executive producers: Alex Graves; Jill Littman; Kyra Sedgwick; Rob Bragin; Tom Jacobson
- Running time: 43 minutes
- Production companies: The Jacobson Company; Kikkos View; Ipso Facto Productions; TNT Original Productions

Original release
- Network: TNT
- Release: June 16 – August 18, 2015

Proof is an American supernatural drama television series that aired on TNT from June 16 through August 18, 2015. The series starred Jennifer Beals, Matthew Modine, and Joe Morton. It was produced by TNT, with Kyra Sedgwick, series creator Rob Bragin, Tom Jacobson, Jill Littman, and Alex Graves serving as executive producers. On September 24, 2015, TNT canceled the series of Proof after one season.

== Plot ==
Following the death of her teenage son, a legal separation from her husband, and a rift with her daughter, Dr. Carolyn Tyler is persuaded by Ivan Turing, a tech inventor and billionaire with cancer, to investigate supernatural cases of reincarnation, near-death experiences, and hauntings, in hopes of finding evidence that death is not final.

== Cast ==
- Jennifer Beals as Dr. Carolyn "Cat" Tyler: A cardiac surgeon at Bay Vista Hospital in Seattle
- Matthew Modine as Ivan Turing: An inventor billionaire stricken with cancer
- David Sutcliffe as Dr. Leonard "Len" Barliss: Carolyn's ex-husband and a pediatric surgeon at Bay Vista
- Edi Gathegi as Dr. Zedan Badawi: A Kenyan intern at Bay Vista who assists Carolyn
- Joe Morton as Dr. Charles Richmond: A hospital administrator at Bay Vista
- Caroline Rose Kaplan as Janel Ramsey: Ivan's assistant
- Callum Blue as Peter Van Owen: A best-selling author who claims to be psychic
- Annie Thurman as Sophie Barliss: Carolyn and Len's teenage daughter

== Reception ==
Proof received mixed reviews. Review aggregator site Metacritic gave the first season a "mixed or average" score of 59 out of 100, based on 11 critics' ratings. On another review aggregator site, Rotten Tomatoes, it held a 57% rating, based on 14 reviews, with an average score of 7.1/10. The Rotten Tomatoes consensus reads: "Proof's intriguing premise – and Jennifer Beals' strong starring performance – can't compensate for a lack of compelling stories."

Brian Lowry of Variety said the show is exploring the mysteries of the afterlife in uninspiring and banal ways. Keith Uhlich writing for The Hollywood Reporter said that on paper, the show "sounds like disaster," but it is revealed to be "a beguiling object."

== Episodes ==
No.	Title	Directed by	Written by	Original release date	US viewers (millions)
1	"Pilot"	Alex Graves	Rob Bragin	June 16, 2015	2.66
Carolyn Tyler is a strict cardiothoracic surgeon who, at times, brings people back from the brink of death. Ivan Turing, a terminally ill billionaire, offers her his $10 billion estate in exchange for evidence of what happens after death. He then recalls her most traumatic experiences: surviving a boat capsizing in Japan and the recent death of her teenage son. Carolyn then checks in on Lilly, a young girl in the hospital who spent five days in a coma. Lilly told her parents of spending those days in "the other place" and drew pictures of people she has never met before, including her grandfather. Later, Lilly undergoes surgery for a blood clot on her brain and, afterward when asked, tells Carolyn that "they" told her not to talk about the other place. Carolyn then commits to Ivan's research.
2	"Til' Death"	Alex Graves	Rob Bragin	June 23, 2015	2.18
When a young man claims he's seen the ghost of his recently deceased wife, Dr. Tyler and her team are brought in to investigate an increasingly bizarre case of loss, love and jealousy.
3	"Showdown"	Alex Graves	Alex Graves	June 30, 2015	2.06
Carolyn and her team investigate the case of an Iraq war vet who claims to have PTSD from a past life experience during the Korean War. Carolyn reconnects with a medical school colleague turned regression therapist.
4	"Redemption"	Peter Werner	Nick Thiel	July 7, 2015	2.09
A cop killer has a terrifying near-death experience in Dr. Tyler's OR. As Cat and her team investigate, they learn his horrible experience also might carry an important message from beyond.
5	"Memento Vivere"	Allison Anders	Lizzie Mickery	July 14, 2015	1.82
When a Jane Doe wakes up in the coma ward with no memory of who she is, Cat and her team are stunned to find that she has memories that belong to other deceased coma patients. Len and Sophie find a surprising connection to Will.
6	"Private Matters"	David Solomon	Jessica Grasl	July 21, 2015	1.83
Turing asks Carolyn to investigate the case of a programmer who died while using a cutting-edge technology that might have recorded images of his death. Zed makes a difficult decision about his future.
7	"St. Luke's"	Steve Robin	Jorge Zamacona	July 28, 2015	2.11
The team investigates a strange haunting at an old church. Carolyn gets an unexpected visit from her parents.
8	"Reborn"	Millicent Shelton	Logan Slakter	August 4, 2015	1.99
When a grieving mother claims she's found the reincarnation of her dead son in one of Carolyn's patients, a young piano prodigy, the lines between Carolyn's proof investigations and professional life begin to blur.
9	"Tsunami: Part One"	Steve Shill	Jessica Grasl & Beth Schacter	August 11, 2015	2.32
Carolyn begins to lose her grip on reality as she deals with a delicate heart transplant case. Turing plans a very dangerous trip.
10	"Tsunami: Part Two"	Nelson McCormick	Nick Thiel & Rob Bragin	August 18, 2015	2.12
Carolyn makes a devastating choice as her proof investigations, personal life and professional life all come to a dangerous head.
