= Marc Flanagan =

American television producer and writer

- Born: Marc Francis Flanagan; February 13, 1948 (age 77); Hartford, Connecticut, U.S.
- Education: Yale School of Drama
- Occupation(s): Television producer, writer

Marc Francis Flanagan (born June 13, 1948) is an American television producer and writer. He was co-creator of the American television sitcom Phenom with Sam Simon and Dick Blasucci.

== Career ==
Flanagan started his career in New York. In 1986 Flanagan moved to Los Angeles, California to produce and write on the FOX television variety show The Tracey Ullman Show. Flanagan was nominated for eight Primetime Emmy Awards for his work on the show, winning in 1989 and 1990.

In 1997 Flanagan was hired to produce and write for season 10 of the television series Murphy Brown, when Rob Bragin and Bill Diamond left the series.
