= Rob Bragin =

American television producer and writer

- Education: University of California, Berkeley
- Occupations: Television producer, writer
- Spouse: Elizabeth Stewart

Rob Bragin is an American television producer and writer. He is the creator of the American supernatural drama Proof, which starred Jennifer Beals, Matthew Modine and Joe Morton. He also produced the television series Murphy Brown from 1993 to 1997.

Bragin has also worked as a writer or producer for television programs including Committed, Growing Pains, Miami Vice, Army Wives, Greek, Lipstick Jungle and Just Legal.
