= TerraTopia =

1990's series of children's books

TerraTopia was a children's book series produced by The Nature Company in the early 1990s and eventually spun off into other products, most notably an adventure game for computers.

== TerraTopia books ==
Several TerraTopia books were released in the early 1990s, as well as a collection of the four stories together as one hardcover volume that was recognized by Parents' Choice Awards. The books took the format of short graphic novels, with comic-book-style panels and word balloons. The stories are about the wonders of nature and caring for the environment. The Elders of TerraTopia bestow upon five ordinary children an animal totem, giving them the ability to assume that animal's form.

- The Secret of the Dragonfly and The Daring Dino Rescue ISBN 1-883871-00-X
- The Adventure of The Wandering Wolves in Vulcan's Vent ISBN
- Sketch's Sketch Book ISBN 1-883871-03-4
- TerraTopia, The Graphic Adventure: The First Four Tales (hardcover compilation) ISBN 1-883871-02-6

== TerraTopia computer game ==
TerraTopia, a computer game designed for boys and girls age 8 and up, was published by Virgin Sound and Vision in 1995 as a part of its Virgin Adventure Series. It was quite often a standard issue game on most computers that came equipped with Windows 95 in the mid to late 1990s.

=== Voiceover Cast ===
The cast of TerraTopia, in order of on-screen appearance:

Actor	Character
Neil Ross	Narrator, Snake Elder, Coyote Trickster
Mitzi McCall	Wolf Elder
Tasia Valenza	Foxfire
Bumper Robinson	Max
Lance Zitron	Bud, Sketch
Nancy Cartwright	Piper

== Other TerraTopia products ==
In 1993 TerraTopia was made into a board game, designed by Peter Olotka of Cosmic Encounter fame and his son, Greg Olotka. In the spirit of the books, the game was cooperative rather than competitive, with all players attempting to overcome various challenges using their Terratrooper abilities and ultimately recover their stones.

== Cancelled and unreleased ==
A Canal+ TerraTopia television show was announced in 1995, planned for release in 1996 as a 52-episode series. Planned to coincide with the television show was a Minolta TerraTopia camera, which would have been Minolta's first camera marketed primarily to kids and would have featured the character Sketch to get children interested in nature photography.

In 1998, The Discovery Channel purchased The Nature Company and converted all remaining Nature Company stores to the Discovery Channel brand. As of 2006, there have been no attempts to revive TerraTopia as a Discovery Channel property.
