= Peter Olotka =

Game designer

- Occupation: Game designer

Peter Olotka is a game designer who has worked primarily on board games, most notably Cosmic Encounter.

== Career ==
After serving in the Peace Corps in the Marshall Islands, Peter Olotka returned to Cape Cod with his wife Cindy and their young son Greg, where he became a community organizer for the region's anti‑poverty program. Olotka met Bill Eberle during a job interview he ultimately didn’t hire him for, yet despite that, the two went on to become friends. In 1972, Olotka and Eberle created the early design of a game that eventually developed into Cosmic Encounter. The game was conceived by Peter Olotka as "the anti Risk," built around the simple but radical idea of players taking on the roles of distinct alien races. Olotka, Jack Kittredge, Eberle, and Bill Norton then formed a game design cooperative called Future Pastimes in an effort to publish the game. After meeting investor Ned Horn while seeking a publisher for Cosmic Encounter, Olotka, Kittredge, Eberle, and Horn founded Eon Products, which released the game in 1977.

Additionally, Allen Varney of Dragon Magazine claimed Olotka mentioned the idea of creating a collectible card game as early as 1979. Olotka, Kittredge, and Eberle also designed the 1979 Dune board game set in Frank Herbert's fantasy novels. Olotka helped rescue the Dune board game by leveraging an old connection with Harlan Ellison, whose intervention prompted Frank Herbert to personally resolve a legal impasse that was holding it up. The innovative four‑shape modular language "letter piece alphabet" system that Olotka co-designed for Runes (1981) later became the foundation for the 2000 game Decipher. Eon's design team—Eberle, Kittredge, and Olotka—became legendary for their innovations in games like Quirks and Borderlands, the latter introducing rotating start player mechanics that helped shape modern European-style design. Eberle, Kittredge, and Olotka also designed Star Trek: The Enterprise 4 Encounter (1985), a board game that mixes combat and set collection, for West End Games.

Olotka released Cosmic Encounter Online in 2003, a high tech Flash adaptation of the original Eon game. In 2008, Olotka and Eberle finally found a publisher for Cosmic Encounter that they felt truly understood Cosmic Encounter: Fantasy Flight Games. Arrakis: Dawn of the Fremen (2022) was designed by Peter Olotka, Jack Kittredge, Bill Eberle, Greg Olotka, and Jack Reda, and published by Gale Force Nine.

== Personal life ==
Olotka was working as the community coordinator for the Cape Cod Community Action Agency by 1969, and was advocating for people through the agency by 1971. By 1976, Olotka was the executive director of the Community Action Committee of Cape Cod and Islands advocacy group. Peter Olotka spent the early 1980s living in Cape Cod, with his wife and two children while serving as the director for the Cape & Islands Community Action Agency. In 1982, Olotka argued that games were booming because they offered reliable, humorous, social entertainment that demanded real mental engagement and, in his view, were less anti social than video games.

Olotka helped in the planning stages of the Liberty Science Center's Issues Theater in Jersey City, New Jersey that opened in 1993. He was a creative consultant for Iventure Place in Akron, Ohio which opened in 1995. Olotka worked as a design consultant with IBM and Paramount Television on the Star Trek program for the non-profit www.TryScience.org website project in 2000.

Olotka said the Manor in Hyannis was ideal for his father‑in‑law Tom Oatman because of its excellent staff and its proximity to the Olotkas’ Centerville home, but after the facility announced its 2000 closure, the family had 60 days to find a new residence for Oatman, who had lived there since summer. After the Manor nursing home announced its closure, Peter and Cynthia Olotka briefly moved Tom Oatman to a distant facility in Falmouth, but because the long drive was unworkable, they soon relocated him to Mayflower Place in Yarmouth, where he settled just ten minutes from their Centerville home.
