= Lords of Conquest =

1986 video game

- Developer: Eon Software
- Publisher: Electronic Arts
- Producer: Don Daglow
- Programmers: Ted Schmeckpeper; Trevor Western
- Platforms: Apple II, Atari 8-bit, Atari ST, Commodore 64, MS-DOS
- Release: 1986
- Genre: Strategy
- Modes: Single-player, multiplayer

Lords of Conquest is a strategy video game published in 1986 by Electronic Arts. It is based on the 1982 board game Borderlands by Eon Productions and developed by Eon's software division. It was marketed with the slogan "Better than Risk!"

The game was programmed for the Apple II in Forth and assembly language by Ted Schmeckpeper and Trevor Western, in collaboration with the designers of the board game: Bill Eberle, Jack Kittredge, and Peter Olotka. Ports were released for the Commodore 64, Atari 8-bit computers, Atari ST, and MS-DOS.

== Gameplay ==
Atari ST screenshot

The game is a contest between two and seven players, of which any number may be human or computer players. Each player is given a specific color, which matches their territories. Computer players can be selected to be Aggressive, Defensive, or Passive in their style of play. The human player(s) then must select how random the odds of an attack are, the amount of resources in the game, and the amount of land vs. water. Additionally, the Victory Conditions are also chosen; of which is the building of three to eight cities. Territories are then selected one at a time amongst the players, until all are selected or a remainder is left that is at least one less than the number of players, which are left black.

After territory selection, the game then moves on to the Production phase, where all the resources per player are tallied and "put" into the stockpile. There is a 25% chance for the Production phase to be skipped on any turn. If it is the first turn, players then place their stockpiles in a territory. Next comes Trade, where players may trade any resources they have for resources they wish. All five resources may be traded, but note that horses must have a territory to "land on" to be accepted. The next phase is Shipment, where the stockpile may be moved. Alternatively, a horse, weapon, or boat may be moved. Note that you may ship a weapon with a horse, or a weapon and/or horse with a boat! There is a 25% chance for the Shipment phase to be skipped on any turn. The fifth phase is Conquest, where you may make up to two attacks on any valid territory. The final phase is Development, where you may buy cities, weapons, or boats.

=== Resources and units ===
After the final territory is selected, the players place stockpiles on the map. The stockpile may be moved once a turn if there is a transport phase, or instead of attacking another player. The stockpile holds all of a player's resources, and if the territory it is located in is taken, those resources are forfeited to the attacking player.

There are five kinds of resources: coal, gold, iron, timber, and horses. Control of each territory with a resource at the beginning of the turn yields one unit of the resource into the stockpile, or two units if the territory is or is adjacent to a city. At the end of the turn boats, cities, or weapons may be purchased.

During combat, the offensive and defensive odds are computed by taking the sum of all territories that touch the territory in question. Therefore, if a defending territory is touched by only one other territory of the same color and three of the attacking player, the offensive:defensive strength is 3:2, meaning the attack will succeed. Other factors can change the combat strengths of the opposing forces, including:

- Boats - Boats have a strength of 2 each. During an attack, Boats may carry one horse and/or one weapon, for a maximum increase in strength of 6. For defensive purposes, each Boat raises the territory defense by 2. A Boat costs 3 wood (or 3 Gold) to build, and there may be multiple boats in a territory, one per piece of coastline the territory possesses. Boats have no movement point limits, but they can't cross land to enter other bodies of water or dock at territories with no open coast tiles.
- Cities - Cities are the key to the game. Besides quantifying victory, Cities double the production of all resources in the territory they are built OR are touching, except Horses. Cities add 2 to the owner's strength. A City costs a Coal, a Gold, an Iron, & a Tree (OR 4 Gold) to build, and there may be only one City per territory.
- Horses - Horses are unique among the resources as they are not a stockpiled good, but rather expand on the map. A Horse is produced in the territory that has the herd icon, or in an adjoining territory. A Horse adds 1 to combat strength, and there may be only one Horse per territory. A horse may move up to 2 spaces to participate in an attack, and may carry a weapon with it or pick one up along the way, giving a maximum strength bonus of 4.
- Weapons - Weapons are bought like Boats or Cities. A weapon adds 3 to the strength of a territory. A weapon costs a Coal and an Iron (or 2 Gold) to build, and there may be only one weapon per territory. Weapons have a move of 1.

=== Conquest and victory ===
In combat, the side with the highest strength wins; that is, one only needs to outnumber the opponent. The resolution of ties depends on a setting at the beginning of the game. High odds means the attacker wins ties, low odds means the defender wins ties, and Random means there is a 50:50 chance of either side winning.

When initiating an attack, it is possible to bring in up to one unit from another territory. If this unit is adjacent to the territory being attacked, there is no bonus; the unit is already part of the combat strength. (Exception: Boats don't add into an attack unless they're brought into the attack.) If the unit brought in is NOT from an adjacent territory, its strength will be added AND, upon successful conquest, will be placed in the territory.

A Horse is capable of bringing along a Weapon, giving a boost of 1 or 4 to combat strength. A horse can also pick up a weapon from a territory it is traveling through or its origin, but if such a Weapon is taken from an adjacent territory, the only gain will be 1 for the Horse (assuming it wasn't also adjacent) and having the units in place in the territory after the attack is resolved (assuming the attacker wins). A Boat can bring a Horse and/or a Weapon, giving up to 6 additional points of strength, assuming the Horse and Weapon weren't from an adjacent territory. Boats can travel anywhere along a given body of water, making them very powerful. Boats cannot pick up other units en route like the Horse can. Boats MUST be able to reach a coastal tile of the target territory; if all coastals tiles are blocked by other Boats (even Boats in adjacent territories occupying the wrong tile), the Boat cannot be used in the attack.

Only one of a given land unit can occupy a territory. It is possible to capture enemy units if a player doesn't bring his own in. Boats are special in that you can have more than one Boat on a territory.

Each player may attack twice in any one round. If a player chooses to move his stockpile on the first attack, he loses the second. Likewise, if the first attack fails, the second is also lost.

Additionally, other players adjacent to the defending territory may choose to side with the offense or the defense and throw in their combat strength to that side.

The game is over when one side builds the number of cities listed as the victory condition, or when all territories have been taken over by a single player. Note that if more than one player exceeds the number of cities required for victory, the game continues until one side falls under that number.

== Reception ==
Compute!'s Gazette called Lords of Conquest "a classic strategy game ... highly enjoyable". Computer Gaming World in 1986 stated that it might be too simple for veteran wargamers, but "offers a quick and pleasant break from complex simulations" and was good for newcomers. In 1990 the magazine gave the game four-plus stars out of five, calling it "a classic wargame ... easy to learn and play" but cautioning that the 16-bit versions did not use their computers' power. In 1993 the magazine gave it three-plus stars.
