= Louis Giambalvo =

American actor

- Born: February 8, 1945 (age 81); Brooklyn, New York City, New York, U.S.
- Education: Harpur College (BFA, MFA)
- Occupation: Actor
- Years active: 1979–2009

Louis Giambalvo (born February 8, 1945) is a retired American actor, frequently seen on television in guest roles.

== Early life and education ==
Giambalvo was born and raised in the Sunset Park neighborhood of Brooklyn, New York City, where he attended Catholic school. He earned a Bachelor of Fine Arts and Master of Fine Arts from Harpur College (now Binghamton University) and was a founding member of the avant-garde Colonnades Theater Lab in Greenwich Village, along with other members Danny DeVito and Peter Scolari. In 1979, Giambalvo moved to Los Angeles, California to begin his film and television career.

== Career ==
His television credits include: Barney Miller, Hart to Hart, St. Elsewhere, Hill Street Blues, The Love Boat, Remington Steele, The A-Team, Simon & Simon, Fame, Knots Landing, Murder, She Wrote, Star Trek: Voyager, Brooklyn South, Ally McBeal, ER, NYPD Blue (Mr. Bucci), Boston Legal, Without a Trace, CSI, Ugly Betty, Dirty Sexy Money and Raising the Bar. He also played Al Capone on the NBC series The Gangster Chronicles. He also was in the award-winning television movie Gia, starring Angelina Jolie, playing the role of Gia Carangi's father Joseph.

Giambalvo's feature films include "Bottle Shock", "Gun Shy", "Hoffa", and the 1983 horror/science fiction film Nightmares. He is best known for his roles in such films as Airplane II: The Sequel (1982), the 1985 comedy film Real Genius as a CIA man, Major Carnagle, Jagged Edge (1985) as Mr. Fabrizzi, the 1988 film The Dead Pool as Gus Wheeler, and the 1989 film Weekend at Bernie's as Vito.

== Selected filmography ==
- 1980 Escape (TV Movie) as Hank
- 1980 Reward (TV Movie) as "Dutch"
- 1980 Alcatraz: The Whole Shocking Story (TV Movie) as Clarence Anglin
- 1981 Fly Away Home (TV Movie) as Vogel
- 1981 Gangster Wars as Al Capone
- 1981 Today's FBI as Vincent Tigner (Pilot episode: The Bureau)
- 1982 The Ambush Murders (TV Movie) as Glenn Landis
- 1982 Marian Rose White (TV Movie) as Eddy White
- 1982 Mae West (TV Movie) as George Kane
- 1982 Airplane II: The Sequel as Witness
- 1983 Hart to Hart as Lt. Davern
- 1983 Second Thoughts as Sergeant Cabrillo
- 1983 Nightmares as Jerry Cooney (segment "The Bishop of Battle")
- 1983 Deal of the Century as Freddie Muntz
- 1984 The Ratings Game (TV Movie) as "Goody" DeSalvo
- 1985 Dirty Work (TV Movie) as George Wylie
- 1985 Real Genius as Major Don Carnagle
- 1985 Jagged Edge as Fabrizi
- 1986 Hardcastle and McCormick as Nick Damion
- 1988 Bad Dreams as Ed
- 1988 Kansas as Army Sergeant
- 1988 The Dead Pool as Gus Wheeler
- 1988 Liberace: Behind the Music (TV Movie) as Eddie
- 1988 Leap of Faith (TV Movie) as Dr. Santini
- 1988 Crossing the Mob (TV Movie)
- 1989 Anything But Love (TV Series) as Norman Kiel
- 1989 See No Evil, Hear No Evil as Lieutenant Gatlin
- 1989 Weekend at Bernie's as Vito
- 1990 The Bonfire of the Vanities as Ray Andruitti
- 1992 Till Death Do Us Part (TV Movie) as Charles Kerwin
- 1992 Those Secrets (TV Movie) as Kobe
- 1992 Mastergate (TV Movie) as Lance Boil
- 1992 Hoffa as RTA Representative
- 1993 Fade to Black (TV Movie)
- 1993 Donato and Daughter (TV Movie) as Chief Hugh Halliday
- 1994 Flashfire as Al Sherwin
- 1994 Moment of Truth: Murder or Memory? (TV Movie) as Lou Panetta
- 1995 Illegal in Blue as Lieutenant Cavanaugh
- 1995 Star Trek: Voyager, Non Sequitur, as Cosimo
- 1997 Always Say Goodbye as Deli Man
- 1998 Gia (TV Movie) as Joe Carangi
- 2000 Gun Shy as DEA Agent Lonny Burke
- 2000 The Lost Child (TV Movie) as Karl
- 2002 Death to Smoochy as Sonny Gordon
- 2003 Duplex as The Pharmacist
- 2008 Bottle Shock as George Taber
