= Spice Harvest =

Board game expansion pack

Spice Harvest is a 1984 expansion for Dune published by The Avalon Hill Game Company.

== Gameplay ==
Spice Harvest provides optional rules for characters in the Dune board game, in which players try to become the Manager of Arrakis who determines how the spice harvest is performed for five years.

== Reception ==
Steve Crow reviewed Spice Harvest in The Space Gamer No. 76. Crow commented that "this supplement is a definite must for those who have grown tired up the old setup rules for Dune."

== Reviews ==
- Analog Science Fiction and Fact
