= Star Trek: The Enterprise 4 Encounter =

Board game

Star Trek: The Enterprise 4 Encounter is a combat board game for 2–4 players published by West End Games in 1985 that is based on the TV series Star Trek.

== Gameplay ==
=== Setting ===
The players, representing the crew of the USS Enterprise, are sent to re-establish communication with Trelane, a powerful being from the Star Trek episode "The Squire of Gothos". Trelane sends each player to a copy of the Enterprise, and scatters the rest of the crew to various planets. It is a board game that mixes combat and set collection.

=== Components ===
- 22" × 17" gameboard
- 28 playing pieces: 4 Enterprises and 24 crew members
- 4-page rule sheet
- 4-page "Captain's Log", a short story written by Douglas Kaufman
- 25 Adventure cards
- 43 Battle cards
- a Reference card
- 4 cardboard Bridge racks
- a 6-sided die

=== Set-up ===
Each player places their Enterprise token on one of the four home planets.

=== Objective ===
Using die rolls for movement, each player must travel around the board, searching planets for marooned crew members, seeking to collect one crew member for each of the six ship Divisions (Command, Science, Medical, Security, Navigation and Communications).

=== Combat ===
Trelane has reformatted the ship sensors so that the other Enterprises appear as Klingon warbirds. If a ship lands on a Tractor Zone, it can force another ship into combat, the winner claiming a crew member from the loser.

=== Final combat ===
Once a player has found one crew member for each of the six Divisions, that player returns to their home planet. The other players engage in a final round of combat to try to steal at least one crew member. If the other players are unsuccessful, the player with all six crew members is the winner. If the other players steal at least one crew member, the game continues.

== Publication history ==
The game was designed by Bill Eberle, Jack Kittredge and Peter Olotka, with cartography by Kevin Wilkins, and was published by West End Games in 1985.

== Reception ==
In the September 1986 edition of White Dwarf (Issue #81), Phil Frances stated that "The game works best with three or four players, and takes less than an hour to play. It grows on you, and it's the sort of game to play when you can't be bothered to set up anything more complex."

== Reviews ==
- Games #73
