= Firefly: The Game =

Firefly: The Game is a 2013 board game published by Gale Force Nine. It is based on the 2002 TV series Firefly.

== Gameplay ==
Firefly: The Game is a game in which players captain their own ship across the 'Verse, hiring crew, upgrading systems, dodging Alliance and Reavers, and completing risky jobs to be the first to achieve the story's objectives.

== Reviews ==
- Black Gate
- Rebel Times #77
