= My Life as a 10-Year-Old Boy =

Book by Nancy Cartwright

- Front cover
- Author: Nancy Cartwright
- Illustrator: Nancy Cartwright
- Cover artist: Creative Capers; Brendan Hitt (design); Ray Kachatorian (photograph)
- Language: English
- Series: The Simpsons
- Subject: The Simpsons
- Genre: Non-fiction; Autobiography; Humor
- Publisher: Hyperion
- Publication date: 30 September 2000
- Publication place: United States
- Media type: Paperback
- Pages: 271
- ISBN: 0-7868-8600-5
- Preceded by: Tehran Nancy

My Life as a 10-Year-Old Boy is an autobiography written by Nancy Cartwright. First published in September 2000 by Hyperion, it details Cartwright's career, particularly her experiences as the voice of Bart Simpson on The Simpsons and contains insights on the show, diary entries and anecdotes about her encounters with various guest stars.

Critics commented that the book seemed to be aimed at fans of The Simpsons rather than a more general audience. Other criticisms included the simplicity of the writing and a lack of interesting stories. In 2004, Cartwright adapted the book into a one-woman show, which she has performed in the UK and North America, including at the Edinburgh Festival Fringe.

== Background ==
In the opening chapter, Cartwright writes "About five years ago I decided I wanted to write this book. I knew that The Simpsons would end some day. [...] I decided that I wanted to write it while the show was still on the air." In an interview with Scotland on Sunday, she added "I wanted to tell my story and I needed to because I get so much fan mail. People are so interested in the whole process, how it all comes together. This book does that." In a 1995 interview, five years before writing the book, Cartwright remarked that she wanted to write a book and that if she did, it would be titled "My Life as a 10-Year-Old Boy."

The book contains excerpts from date books and journals that Cartwright had kept over the years. The book was officially announced in January 2000 and Cartwright had originally intended that it be released on October 31.

== Content ==
My Life as a 10-Year-Old Boy opens with a dedication to Daws Butler, a list of acknowledgements and a foreword from Cartwright's The Simpsons co-star Dan Castellaneta. The first chapter of the book details Cartwright's life and career prior to 1987. In the second chapter, Cartwright recalls the day she went to audition for a role in a series of animated shorts on The Tracey Ullman Show. The shorts were about a dysfunctional family and Cartwright intended to audition for the role of Lisa Simpson, the eldest daughter. Upon arriving at the audition, she found the role of her brother Bart to be much more interesting. Matt Groening, creator of the shorts, allowed her to audition for Bart, and gave her the job on the spot after hearing her reading. From there, the book contains her experiences as the voice of Bart. After three seasons of shorts, a half-hour spinoff called The Simpsons debuted in 1989. In the following chapters, she recalls the early days of The Simpsons, commenting on the recording process and her co-stars and revealing how she got the roles of some of the other characters she voices, including Nelson Muntz and Ralph Wiggum. In the 15th chapter, she discusses her experiences of voicing a famous character, but rarely being recognized.

Several chapters are devoted to a detailed "behind the scenes" look at how an episode of The Simpsons is made, including the writing, recording and animation. My Life as a 10-Year-Old Boy contains multiple excerpts from Cartwright's diary detailing various events, mostly encounters with The Simpsons guest stars. Guest stars she talks about include Ernest Borgnine, Danny DeVito, Kirk Douglas, Mel Gibson, Kelsey Grammer, Tom Jones, Michael Jackson, Mickey Rooney, Meryl Streep and Elizabeth Taylor. One chapter describes the day she found out that Phil Hartman, a frequent guest star on The Simpsons, was murdered. The final chapter is a retrospective in which she answers the question "what is it like to be the voice behind the star?"

== Reception ==
My Life as a 10-Year-Old Boy's original print of 25,000 copies were sold on pre-order in the United Kingdom, with 38,000 copies being sold. Cartwright began a publicity tour in late October 2000, starting in her hometown of Dayton, Ohio, where the book became the top selling non-fiction in the town in the first week of November 2000.

Laura A. Bischoff of the Dayton Daily News commented that the book was the "ultimate insider's guide to The Simpsons." However, several critics commented that the book was straightforward and presented few interesting stories. Susan Shapiro of The New York Times wrote that "Although the paradoxes of being 'a celebrity nobody knows' are interesting, the photographs, diary entries and overly cute commentaries make this book feel like a personal scrapbook." Rosellen Brewer of the Library Journal commented that "Cartwright's own life notwithstanding, there is nothing really new or exciting here. She knew what she wanted to do and was able to do it; end of story." Lee Bacchus of The Province wrote that "This little book by the voice of Bart Simpson reads as if it were written by a 10-year-old boy. Not that that's all bad. Cartwright, who voices Bart along with Ralph Wiggum and a few others on The Simpsons, gives a very unchallenging tour behind the scenes of the phenomenally successful series. It's kind of fun to discover how the show is put together and how an adult woman snagged one of the coolest jobs in the world [...] If only it wasn't all so relentlessly perky."

Another common criticism was that the book was aimed at fans of The Simpsons and not a general audience. A preview in People said the bottom line was that the book is "for die-hard fans only." Bacchus concurred, saying "Cartwright writes as if she were speaking to devotees of The Simpsons Fan Club, too often providing bland tidbits of background that only obsessives would ever really care about." Rob Sheridan of the National Post also believes that the book is "aimed squarely at rabid Simpsons fans", and criticized the writing, commenting that "the chronology of her story is sometimes muddled, and a lot of sentences have that first-draft feeling [...] But none of this is anything to have a cow about."

== Stage adaptation ==
In 2004, My Life as a 10-Year-Old Boy was adapted into a one-woman play. Described as "a romp through Springfield through [Cartwright's] eyes", the first portion of the play is scripted and includes anecdotes from Cartwright, dialogue performed in her characters' voices and video clips from The Simpsons. At the end, she does a question and answer session and occasionally plays a game to allow for audience participation. Cartwright's friend Rose Goss co-wrote the play, and serves as director. Cartwright has performed the show at various locations, including the Big Laugh Comedy Festival in Parramatta, Australia, in March 2004, a three-week run at the Edinburgh Festival Fringe in Edinburgh, Scotland in August 2004, at the "Simpsons Mania" convention in Toronto, Canada, (the North American debut of the play) in October 2004 and at Riverside Studios in London, England, in May 2005.

The play has received modest reviews. Julian Hall of The Independent criticized it for a lack of inside stories about The Simpsons, writing that "Cartwright never allows you to become bored but that means some issues are skirted over faster than American closing credits on television. You never really get a feel what it is like recording the show." Brian Logan of The Guardian described Cartwright as "a lively host [...] eager to please", but found the play to be "an overweeningly upbeat collection of Simpsons chitchat." David Chatterton of British Theatre Guide described it as "interesting and entertaining, but not really a 'must see' even for Simpsons fans." Clive Davis of The Times wrote that "In contrast to The Simpsons itself, where not a line, not a syllable, goes to waste, Cartwright has a habit of losing herself in anecdotes that stumble into dead-ends. [...] The half-hearted trivia quiz involving volunteers from the audience soon dies a death too. The performance really cries out for a hard-headed director. The video clips of Cartwright at large are fun, however."
