= The Duel (board game) =

Board game expansion

The Duel is a 1984 expansion for Dune published by The Avalon Hill Game Company.

== Gameplay ==
The Duel provides optional rules for duels between character groups for the Dune board game.

== Reception ==
Steve Crow reviewed The Duel in The Space Gamer No. 76. Crow commented that "In all, The Duel makes an interesting supplement to the original Dune rules, but overuse of the challenge rules just bogs down the game."

== Reviews ==
- Analog Science Fiction and Fact
