= Gale Force Nine =

Board game publishing company

Gale Force Nine, LLC.
- Industry: Gaming, Miniatures
- Founded: 2018
- Headquarters: Virginia, United States
- Key people: John Kovaleski
- Website: https://www.gf9games.com/

Gale Force Nine, LLC. (GF9) is a Virginia, United States-based company that publishes and sells wargames and game accessories such as miniatures and terrain.

== History ==
GF9 was started as a game accessory manufacturer in 1998 by John Kovaleski, and left the company in 2018.

In 2007, another game company, Battlefront, purchased GF9, and the company subsequently expanded its production lines to include Battlefield in a Box, a line of fully painted terrain for miniature wargames, as well as licensed miniatures and accessories for Dungeons & Dragons.

In February 2009, Battlefront Miniatures Ltd of Auckland announced the purchase of Gale Force Nine. Battlefront Miniatures produces the Flames of War WWII miniature wargame.

== Products ==
In 2010, GF9 published their first board wargame, Spartacus, and followed this up with Star Trek: Ascendancy, licensed expansions for Dune, and the Firefly: The Game for the Firefly franchise.

Aliens (2020)

Dune (2019, 2021)

Doctor Who: Don’t Blink (April 2022)

Aliens: Another Glorious Day in the Corp (June 2023)

Clash of Steel (April 2024)

Adventures of Conan (April 2025)

== See also ==
- Wargame
- Avalon Hill
