= Star Trek: Ascendancy =

2016 board game

Star Trek: Ascendancy is a grand strategy game set in the Star Trek universe. it is published by Gale Force Nine.

== Overview ==
Star Trek: Ascendancy is a grand strategy game set in the Star Trek universe, depicting colonization of the galaxy. The goal of the game is to conquer planets for one's own species. Playable factions include the Federation, the Klingons, and the Romulans. Player pieces are presented as starships. During the game, players can take new planets by building ships, and sending them out to explore, colonize and develop new worlds. During the game, players may develop their own forces by upgrading technology. Players can fight other players in combat, or make trade agreements with them. Various action cards allow players to take various unique actions or to get certain bonuses or access to special features or advancements.

=== Genres ===
This game is classified in the subgenre known as 4X (abbreviation of Explore, Expand, Exploit, Exterminate). This is a subgenre of strategy-based computer and board games, and includes both turn-based and real-time strategy titles. The gameplay generally involves building an empire. Emphasis is placed upon economic and technological development, as well as a range of military and non-military routes to supremacy.

The earliest 4X games borrowed ideas from board games and 1970s text-based computer games. The first 4X computer games were turn-based, but real-time 4X games were also common. Many 4X computer games were published in the mid-1990s, but were later outsold by other types of strategy games. Sid Meier's Civilization is an important example from this formative era, and popularized the level of detail that later became a staple of the genre. In the new millennium, several 4X releases have become critically and commercially successful.

In the board (and card) game domain, 4X is less of a distinct genre, in part because of the practical constraints of components and playing time. The Civilization board game that gave rise to Sid Meier's Civilization, for instance, includes neither exploration nor extermination. Unless extermination is targeted at non-player entities, it tends to be either nearly impossible (because of play balance mechanisms, since player elimination is usually considered an undesirable feature) or certainly unachievable (because victory conditions are triggered before extermination can be completed) in board games.

== See also ==
- Grand strategy wargame
- Star trek games
