= Eon Products =

Tabletop role-playing game publisher

Eon Products was an American game company that produced board games and game supplements.

== History ==
In 1972, Peter Olotka, Jack Kittredge, Bill Eberle, and Bill Norton came together as the game design cooperative Future Pastimes. Seeking to publish their board game Cosmic Encounter, they met Ned Horn, who offered to invest in the game; several weeks later, Olotka, Kittredge, Eberle, and Horn created a new company, Eon Products, and Cosmic Encounter went to press in 1977.

The company also produced Hoax, Ruins, Quirks and Borderlands. The latter was implemented as the computer game Lords of Conquest (1986) published by Eon Software, Inc, and was re-released by Fantasy Flight games as Gearworld: The Borderlands. The Eon design team also designed the Dune boardgame for the Avalon Hill Game Company.
