= Marian Rose White =

American television movie (1982)

- Genre: Drama
- Written by: Garry Rusoff
- Directed by: Robert Day
- Starring: Nancy Cartwright; Charles Aidman; Ruth Silveira; Louis Giambalvo; Valerie Perrine; Katharine Ross; Frances Lee McCain
- Theme music composer: Billy Goldenberg
- Country of origin: United States
- Original language: English

Production
- Executive producer: Gerald W. Abrams
- Producer: Steve Nicolaides
- Cinematography: Richard C. Glouner
- Editor: Gregory Prange
- Running time: 120 min.
- Production companies: Cypress Point Productions; Gerald Abrams Productions

Original release
- Network: CBS
- Release: January 19, 1982

Marian Rose White is a 1982 American television film directed by Robert Day, written by Garry Rusoff and starring Nancy Cartwright in one of her earliest performances. The film was nominated for the Primetime Emmy Award for Outstanding Sound Editing for a Miniseries, Movie or a Special.

== Cast members ==
- Nancy Cartwright
- Charles Aidman
- Ruth Silveira
- Louis Giambalvo
- Valerie Perrine
- Katharine Ross
- Frances Lee McCain
- John Davey
- John Considine
- Anne Ramsey
- Ricky Wittman

== Reviews ==
Janet Maslin, a critic for The New York Times, described Cartwright as "a chubby, lumbering, slightly cross-eyed actress whose naturalness adds greatly to the film's impact".
