= Nancy Cartwright =

American actress (born 1957)

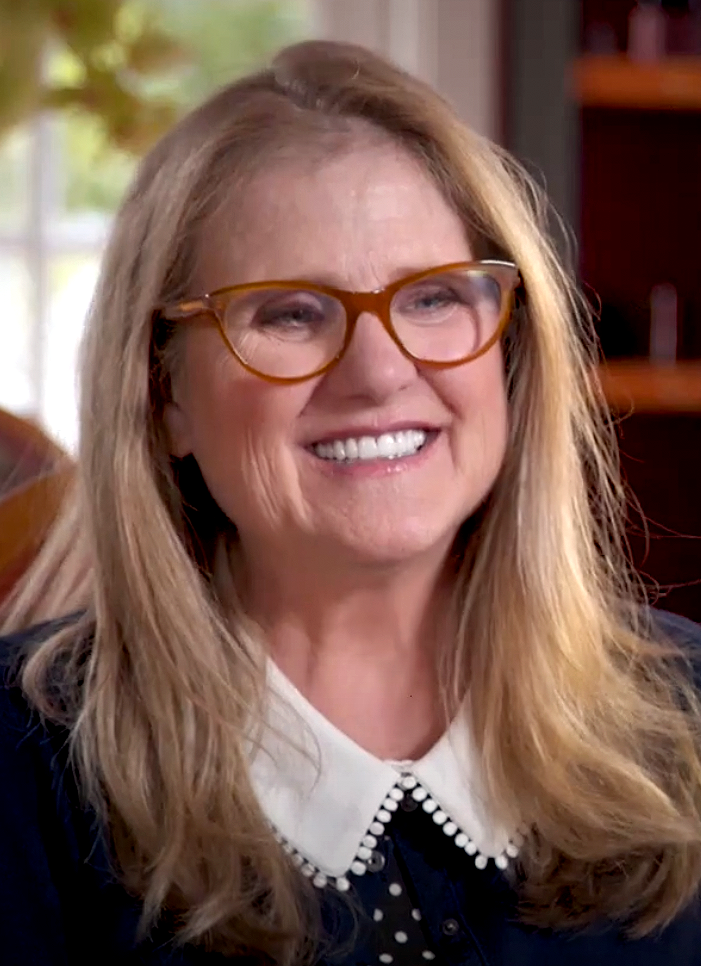
- Cartwright in 2019
- Born: Nancy Jean Cartwright; October 25, 1957 (age 69); Dayton, Ohio, U.S.
- Education: University of California, Los Angeles (BA)
- Occupation: Actress
- Years active: 1980–present
- Spouse: Warren Murphy (m. 1988; div. 2002)
- Children: 2

YouTube information
- Channel: Nancy Cartwright
- Years active: 2015–present
- Genres: Voice acting; comedy; animation; pop culture
- Subscribers: 656 thousand
- Views: 177 million
- Website: nancycartwright.com

Nancy Jean Cartwright (born October 25, 1957) is an American actress. She has served as the long-time voice of Bart Simpson on The Simpsons, which won her a Primetime Emmy Award for Outstanding Voice-Over Performance and an Annie Award for Best Voice Acting in the Field of Animation. Cartwright also voices other characters for the show, including Maggie Simpson, Ralph Wiggum, Todd Flanders, and Nelson Muntz. She is also the voice of Chuckie Finster in the Nickelodeon series Rugrats and its spin-off All Grown Up!, succeeding Christine Cavanaugh.

Cartwright was born in Dayton, Ohio. She moved to Hollywood in 1978 and trained under voice actor Daws Butler. Her first professional role was voicing Gloria in the animated series Richie Rich, which she followed with a starring role in the television movie Marian Rose White (1982) and her first feature film, Twilight Zone: The Movie (1983). In 1987, Cartwright auditioned for a role in a series of animated shorts about a dysfunctional family that was to appear on The Tracey Ullman Show. Cartwright intended to audition for the role of Lisa Simpson, the middle child; when she arrived at the audition, she found the role of Bart—Lisa's brother—to be more interesting. Series creator Matt Groening allowed her to audition for Bart and offered her the role on the spot. She voiced Bart for three seasons on The Tracey Ullman Show, and in 1989, the shorts were spun off into a half-hour show called The Simpsons.

Besides The Simpsons, Cartwright has also voiced numerous other animated characters, including Daffney Gillfin in Snorks, Mellissa Screetch in Toonsylvania, Rufus in Kim Possible, Mindy in Animaniacs, Pistol in Goof Troop, the Robots in Crashbox, Margo Sherman in The Critic and Todd Daring in The Replacements. In 2000, she published her autobiography, My Life as a 10-Year-Old Boy, and four years later, adapted it into a one-woman play. In 2017, she wrote and produced the film In Search of Fellini.

== Early life ==
Nancy Jean Cartwright was born on October 25, 1957, in Dayton, Ohio. She was the fourth of six children born to Frank (1927–2020) and Miriam (née Wendel; 1929–1978) Cartwright. She grew up in Kettering, Ohio, and discovered her talent for voices at an early age. While in the fourth grade at the school of St. Charles Borromeo, she won a school-wide speech competition with her performance of Rudyard Kipling's How the Camel Got His Hump. Cartwright attended Fairmont West High School, and participated in the school's theater and marching band. She regularly entered public speaking competitions, placing first in the "Humorous Interpretation" category at the National District Tournament two years running. The judges often suggested to her that she should perform cartoon voices. Cartwright graduated from high school in 1976 and accepted a scholarship from Ohio University. She continued to compete in public speaking competitions; during her sophomore year, she placed fifth in the National Speech Tournament's exposition category with her speech "The Art of Animation".

In 1976, Cartwright landed a part-time job doing voice-overs for commercials on WING radio in Dayton. A representative from Warner Bros. Records visited WING and later sent Cartwright a list of contacts in the animation industry. One of these was Daws Butler, known for voicing characters such as Huckleberry Hound, Snagglepuss, Elroy Jetson, Spike the Bulldog, and Yogi Bear. Cartwright called him and left a message in a Cockney accent on his answering machine. Butler immediately called her back and agreed to be her mentor. He mailed her a script and instructed her to send him a tape recording of herself reading it. Once he received the tape, Butler critiqued it and sent her notes. For the next year, they continued in this way, completing a new script every few weeks. Cartwright described Butler as "absolutely amazing, always encouraging, always polite".

Cartwright returned to Ohio University for her sophomore year, but transferred to the University of California, Los Angeles (UCLA) so she could be closer to Hollywood and Butler. Her mother, Miriam, died late in the summer of 1978. Cartwright nearly changed her relocation plans but, on September 17, 1978, "joylessly" left for Westwood, Los Angeles.

== Career ==
=== Early career ===
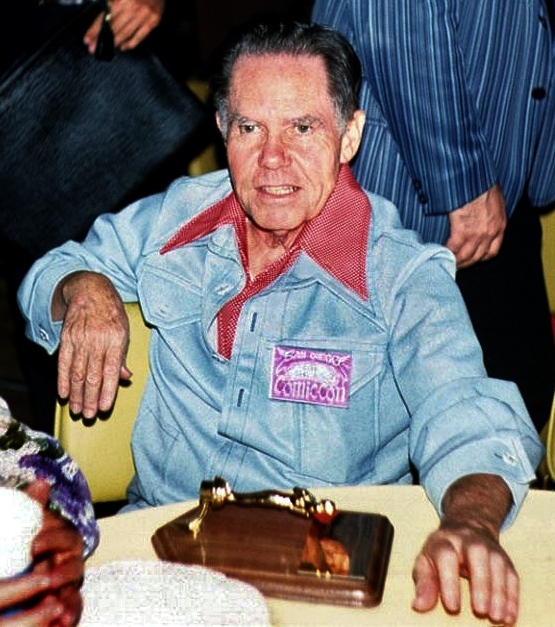
Daws Butler was Cartwright's mentor and helped her become a voice actress.

While attending UCLA, which did not have a public speaking team, Cartwright continued training as a voice actress with Butler. She recalled, "every Sunday I'd take a 20-minute bus ride to his house in Beverly Hills for a one-hour lesson and be there for four hours ... They had four sons, they didn't have a daughter and I kind of fitted in as the baby of the family." Butler introduced her to many of the voice actors and directors at Hanna-Barbera. After she met the director Gordon Hunt, he asked her to audition for a recurring role as Gloria in Richie Rich. She received the part, and later worked with Hunt on several other projects. At the end of 1980, Cartwright signed with a talent agency and landed a lead role in a pilot for a sitcom called In Trouble. Cartwright described the show as "forgettable, but it jump-started my on-camera career". She graduated from UCLA in 1981 with a degree in theater. During the summer, Cartwright worked with Jonathan Winters as part of an improvisation troupe at Kenyon College in Gambier, Ohio.

Returning to Los Angeles, Cartwright won the lead role in the television film Marian Rose White. Janet Maslin, a critic for The New York Times, described Cartwright as "a chubby, lumbering, slightly cross-eyed actress whose naturalness adds greatly to the film's impact". Cartwright replied by sending Maslin a letter insisting she was not cross-eyed, and included a photograph. Later, Cartwright auditioned for the role of Ethel, a girl who becomes trapped in a cartoon world in the third segment of Twilight Zone: The Movie. She met with director Joe Dante and later described him as "a total cartoon buff, and once he took a look at my resume and noticed Daws Butler's name on it, we were off and running, sharing anecdotes about Daws and animation. After about twenty minutes, he said, 'considering your background, I don't see how I could cast anyone but you in this part!'" It was her first role in a feature film. The segment was based on The Twilight Zone television series episode "It's a Good Life", which was later parodied in The Simpsons episode "Treehouse of Horror II" (1991).

Cartwright continued to do voice work for projects including Pound Puppies, Popeye and Son, Snorks, My Little Pony and Saturday Supercade. She joined a "loop group", and recorded vocals for characters in the background of films, although in most cases the sound was turned down so that very little of her voice was heard. She did minor voice-over work for several films, including The Clan of the Cave Bear (1986), Silverado (1985), Sixteen Candles (1984), Back to the Future Part II, and The Color Purple (1985). Cartwright also voiced a shoe that was "dipped" in acid in Who Framed Roger Rabbit (1988), describing it as her first "off-screen death scene", and worked to correctly convey the emotion involved.

Once I had graduated from UCLA, I decided that as long as I was an actress, I was going to find related work in the industry. There were plenty of opportunities. And fortunately, I am just pushy enough to find and get myself in touch with those who can provide such opportunities.

— Nancy Cartwright, My Life as a 10-Year-Old Boy

In 1985, she auditioned for a guest spot as Cynthia in Cheers. The audition called for her to say her line and walk off the set. Cartwright decided to take a chance on being different and continued walking, leaving the building and returning home. The production crew was confused, but she received the part. In search of more training as an actress, Cartwright joined a class taught by Hollywood coach Milton Katselas. He recommended that Cartwright study La Strada, a 1956 Italian film starring Giulietta Masina and directed by Federico Fellini. She began performing "every imaginable scene" from La Strada in her class and spent several months trying to secure the rights to produce a stage adaptation. She visited Italy with the intention of meeting Fellini and requesting his permission in person. Although they never met, Cartwright kept a journal of the trip and later wrote a one-woman play called In Search of Fellini, partially based on her voyage. The play was co-written by Peter Kjenaas, and Cartwright won a Drama-Logue Award after performing it in Los Angeles in 1995. In a 1998 interview, she stated her intention to make it into a feature film, which she succeeded in doing in 2017.

=== The Simpsons ===
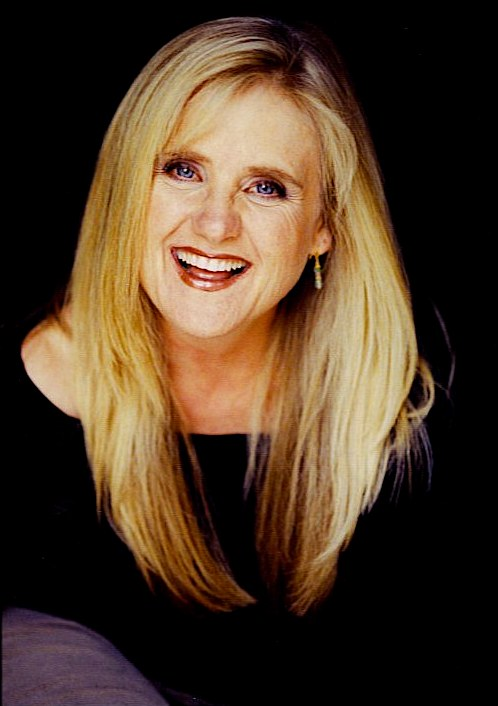
Cartwright in 2007

Cartwright voices the character Bart Simpson on the long-running animated television show The Simpsons. On March 13, 1987, she auditioned for a series of animated shorts about a dysfunctional family that was to appear on The Tracey Ullman Show, a sketch comedy program. Cartwright had intended to audition for the role of Lisa Simpson, the elder daughter. After arriving at the audition, she found that Lisa was simply described as the middle child and at the time did not have much personality. Cartwright became more interested in the role of Bart, described as "devious, underachieving, school-hating, irreverent, [and] clever". Creator Matt Groening let her try out for Bart and gave her the job on the spot. Bart's voice came naturally to Cartwright, as she had previously used elements of it in My Little Pony, Snorks, and Pound Puppies. Cartwright describes Bart's voice as easy to perform compared with other characters. The recording of the shorts was often primitive; the dialog was recorded on a portable tape deck in a makeshift studio above the bleachers on the set of The Tracey Ullman Show. Cartwright, the only cast member to have been professionally trained in voice acting, described the sessions as "great fun". However, she wanted to appear in the live-action sketches and occasionally showed up for recording sessions early, hoping to be noticed by a producer.

In 1989, the shorts were spun off into a half-hour show on the Fox network called The Simpsons. Bart quickly became the show's breakout personality and one of the most celebrated characters on television—his popularity in 1990 and 1991 was known as "Bartmania". Bart was described as "television's brightest new star" by Mike Boone of The Gazette and was named 1990's "entertainer of the year" by Entertainment Weekly. Despite Bart's fame, however, Cartwright remained relatively unknown. During the first season of The Simpsons, Fox ordered Cartwright not to give interviews, because they did not want to publicize the fact that Bart was voiced by a woman. Cartwright's normal speaking voice is said to have "no obvious traces of Bart", and she believes her role is "the best acting job in the world" since she is rarely recognized in public. When she is recognized and asked to perform Bart's voice in front of children, Cartwright refuses because it "freaks [them] out". Bart's catchphrase "Eat My Shorts" was an ad-lib by Cartwright in one of the original table readings, referring to an incident from her high school days. Once while performing, members of the Fairmont West High School marching band switched their chant from the usual "Fairmont West! Fairmont West!" to the irreverent "Eat my shorts!" Cartwright felt it appropriate for Bart, and improvised the line; it became a popular catchphrase on the show.

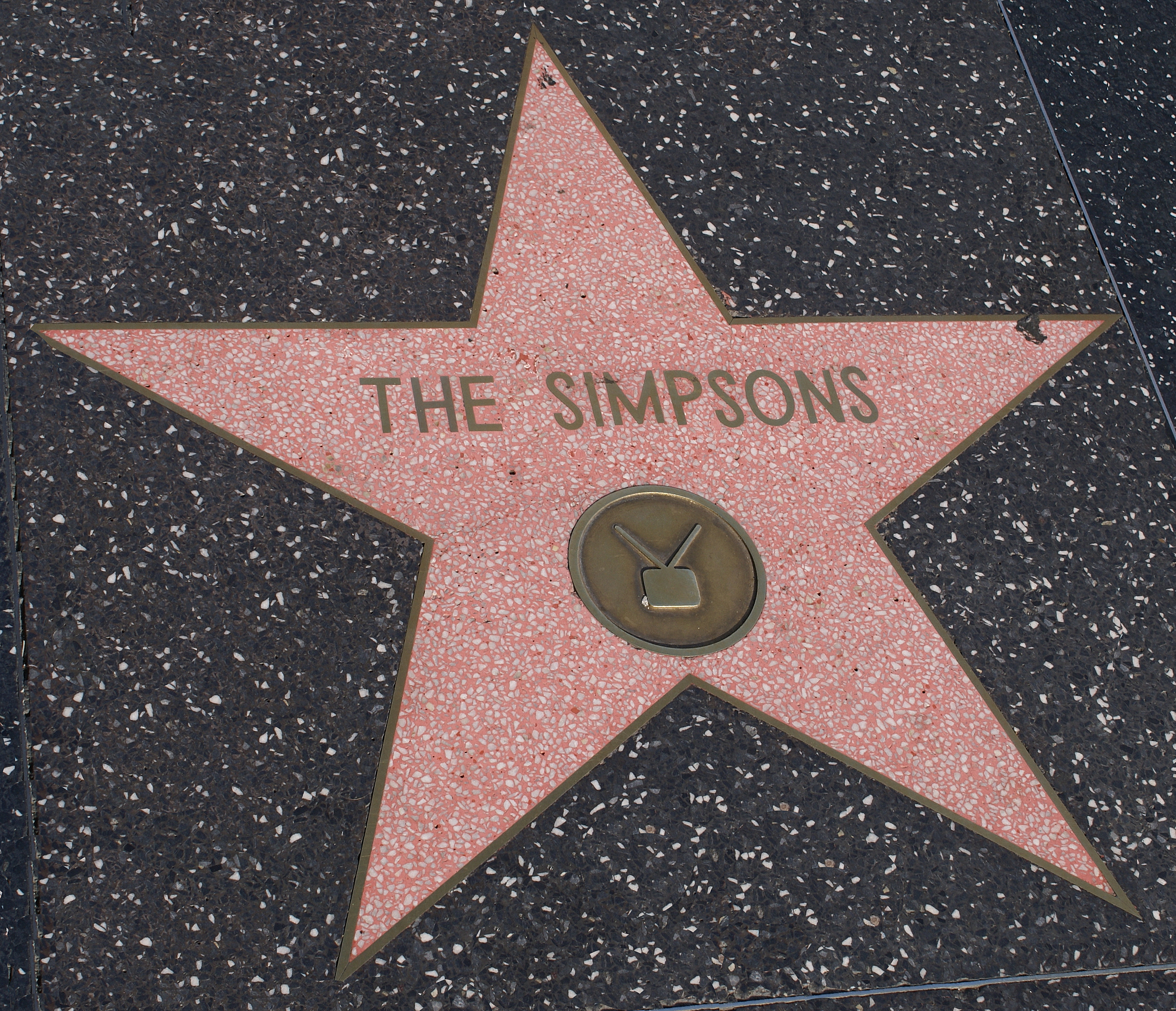
In 2000, Bart, along with the rest of the Simpson family, was awarded a star on the Hollywood Walk of Fame.

Cartwright voices several other characters on the show, including Nelson Muntz, Ralph Wiggum, Todd Flanders, Kearney, and Database. She first voiced Nelson in the episode "Bart the General" (season one, 1990). The character was to be voiced by Dana Hill, but Hill missed the recording session and Cartwright was given the role. She developed Nelson's voice on the spot and describes him as "a throat-ripper". Ralph Wiggum had originally been voiced by Jo Ann Harris, but Cartwright was assigned to voice the character in "Bart the Murderer" (season three, 1991). Todd Flanders, the only voice for which Cartwright used another source, is based on Sherman (voiced by Walter Tetley), the boy from Peabody's Improbable History, a series of shorts aired on The Rocky and Bullwinkle Show.

Cartwright received a Primetime Emmy Award for Outstanding Voice-Over Performance in 1992 for her performance as Bart in the episode "Separate Vocations" and an Annie Award in 1995 for Best Voice Acting in the Field of Animation. Bart was named one of the 100 most important people of the 20th century by Time, and in 2000, Bart and the rest of the Simpson family were awarded a star on the Hollywood Walk of Fame, located at 7021 Hollywood Boulevard.

Until 1998, Cartwright was paid $30,000 per episode. During a pay dispute in 1998, Fox threatened to replace the six main voice actors and made preparations for casting new actors. The dispute was resolved, however, and Cartwright received $125,000 per episode until 2004, when the voice actors demanded $360,000 an episode. A compromise was reached after a month, and Cartwright's pay rose to $250,000 per episode. Salaries were re-negotiated in 2008 with the voice actors receiving approximately $400,000 per episode. Three years later, with Fox threatening to cancel the series unless production costs were cut, Cartwright and the other cast members accepted a 25 percent pay cut, down to just over $300,000 per episode.

=== Further career ===
It is quite a curiosity being a celebrity that nobody knows. I ask you, how many celebrities would you not recognize were they to walk down the street? ... I can think of no one—besides my fellow cast members and me. The anonymity factor is such a unique aspect of this job. I must admit, sometimes I wish it were different.

— Nancy Cartwright, My Life as a 10-Year-Old Boy

In addition to her work on The Simpsons, Cartwright has voiced many other characters on several animated series, including Chuckie Finster in Rugrats and All Grown Up!, Margo Sherman in The Critic, Mindy in Animaniacs, and Rufus the naked mole-rat in Kim Possible. For the role of Rufus, Cartwright researched mole-rats extensively, and became "a font of useless trivia". She was nominated for a Daytime Emmy Award for Outstanding Performer in an Animated Program in 2004 for her work on the show. In 2001, Cartwright took over the Rugrats role of Chuckie Finster when Christine Cavanaugh retired. Cartwright describes Rufus and Chuckie as her two most difficult voices: "Rufus because my diaphragm gets a workout while trying to utilize the 18 vocal sounds a mole makes. Chuckie because ... he's an asthmatic with five personalities rolled into one—plus I have to do the voice the way [Cavanaugh] did it for 10 years." Other television shows that have used her voice work include Galaxy High, God, the Devil and Bob, Goof Troop, Mike, Lu & Og, The Replacements, Pinky and the Brain and Timberwolf. Cartwright has appeared on camera in numerous television shows and films, including Fame, Empty Nest, The Fresh Prince of Bel-Air, Flesh and Blood, Godzilla, and 24.

In 2000, Cartwright published her autobiography, My Life as a 10-Year-Old Boy. The book details her career (particularly her experiences as the voice of Bart) and contains stories about life behind the scenes of The Simpsons. Laura A. Bischoff of the Dayton Daily News commented that the book was the "ultimate insider's guide to The Simpsons". Critics complained that the book lacked interesting stories and was aimed mostly at fans of The Simpsons rather than a general audience.

Cartwright adapted My Life as a 10-Year-Old Boy into a one-woman play in 2004. Cartwright has performed it at a variety of venues, including the August 2004 Edinburgh Festival Fringe in Scotland. The play received modest reviews, including criticism for a lack of inside stories about The Simpsons, and its "overweeningly upbeat" tone. David Chatterton of The British Theatre Guide described the show as "interesting and entertaining, but not really a 'must see' even for Simpsons fans".

Cartwright has shown an interest in stock car racing and as of 2007 was seeking a NASCAR license. In 2001, she founded a production company called SportsBlast and created an online animated series called The Kellys. The series is focused on racing; Cartwright voices a seven-year-old named Chip Kelly.

In 2016, Cartwright launched Spotted Cow Entertainment, her own film and television production company, with Peter Kjenaas, Monica Gil and Kevin Burke. With a focus on international audiences, Spotted Cow is seeking "to finance, produce and acquire live action and animated films, television series, as well as entertainment for digital platforms with budgets up to $15M." With Spotted Cow, Cartwright made her first film as a screenwriter and producer, In Search of Fellini, which was released on September 15, 2017. Based on her own journey to Italy in 1985 in a bid to meet the famed director Federico Fellini, the film fulfilled Cartwright's longtime vision of turning her 1995 one-woman play In Search of Fellini into a film.

== Personal life ==
Cartwright met real-estate agent Warren Murphy on her birthday in 1988 and married him two months later. In her book, she describes Murphy as her "personal laugh track". The couple had two children, before divorcing in 2002.

Cartwright was raised a Roman Catholic but joined the Church of Scientology in 1991. In 2007, Cartwright, then making about $400,000 per episode, was awarded Scientology's Patron Laureate Award after donating $10,000,000 to the Church.

Cartwright is a contributor to ASIFA-Hollywood's Animation Archive Project. In September 2007, Cartwright received the Make-A-Wish Foundation's Wish Icon Award "for her tremendous dedication to the Foundation's fundraising and wish-fulfillment efforts." In 2005, Cartwright created a scholarship at Fairmont High School "designed to aid Fairmont [graduates] who dream of following in her footsteps and studying speech, debate, drama or music" at Ohio University. In 2005, Cartwright was given the title of Honorary Mayor of Northridge, California (a neighborhood of Los Angeles) by the Northridge Chamber of Commerce.

In 2007, Cartwright was in a romantic relationship with contractor Stephen Brackett, a fellow member of Scientology. Before his May 2009 death by suicide, the couple had made plans during early 2008 to marry.

In 2012, Cartwright received an honorary doctorate degree in communication from Ohio University, where she was a student from 1976 to 1977 before transferring to UCLA.

Cartwright is also a painter, sculptor and philanthropist. She co-founded the Know More About Drugs alliance. Her stepbrother David Carpenter is the father of singer and actress Sabrina Carpenter.

== Filmography ==
=== Live-action ===
==== Film ====
List of acting performances in feature films
Year	Title	Role	Notes
1983	Twilight Zone: The Movie	Ethel	Segment: "It's a Good Life"
1985	Heaven Help Us	Girl at dance	Uncredited
1985	Flesh and Blood	Kathleen	
1988	Yellow Pages	Stephanie	Titled Going Underground in US
1992	Petal to the Metal	Fawn Deer	Short film
1998	Godzilla	Caiman's secretary	
2008	Struck	Nurse	Short film
2013	I Know That Voice	Herself	Documentary
2017	In Search of Fellini	Cosima	Also writer
2022	Borrego	Deserie	

==== Television ====
List of acting performances in television shows
Year	Title	Role	Notes
1981	Skokie	Unnamed character	TV film; uncredited
1982	Marian Rose White	Marian Rose White	TV film
1982	The Rules of Marriage	Jill Murray	TV film
1982	Tucker's Witch	Holly	Episode: "Terminal Case"
1983	Deadly Lessons	Libby Dean	TV film
1983–84	Fame	Muffin	2 episodes
1985	Not My Kid	Jean	TV film
1985	Cheers	Cynthia	Episode: "Diane's Nightmare"
1986	Bridges to Cross	Unnamed character	Episode: "Memories of Molly"
1987	Our House	Unnamed character	Episode: "Growing Up, Growing Old"
1987	Mr. Belvedere	Gwen	Episode: "The Initiation"
1989	TV 101	Melinda	Episode: "On the Road"
1989	Empty Nest	Ann	Episode: "Tears of a Clown"
1993	Precious Victims	Ruth Potter	TV film
1995	The Fresh Prince of Bel-Air	Ruby Jillette	Episode: "Save the Last Trance for Me"
1995	Baywatch Nights	Frances O'Reilly	Episode: "976 Ways to Say I Love You"
1996	Vows of Deception	Terry	TV film
1996	Suddenly	Dell	TV film
2007	24	Jeannie Tyler	Episode: "Day 6: 4:00 p.m.-5:00 p.m"
2010	The Simpsons 20th Anniversary Special – In 3-D! On Ice!	Herself; Bart Simpson (voice)	TV special
2012	FOX 25th Anniversary Special	Bart Simpson (voice)	TV special

=== Voice roles ===
==== Film ====
List of voice performances in feature and direct-to-video films
Year	Title	Role	Notes
1986	My Little Pony: The Movie	Gusty, Bushwoolie #4	
1987	The Chipmunk Adventure	Arabian Prince, Additional voices	
1988	Pound Puppies and the Legend of Big Paw	Bright Eyes	
1988	Who Framed Roger Rabbit	Dipped Toon Shoe	Uncredited
1989	Little Nemo: Adventures in Slumberland	Page	
1989	The Little Mermaid	Female Mermaid	
1998	The Jungle Book: Mowgli's Story	Wolf Pup, Doe, Macaw, Skunk, Chimp	Direct-to-video release
1998	The Land Before Time VI: The Secret of Saurus Rock	Dana	Direct-to-video release
1999	Wakko's Wish	Mindy	Direct-to-video release
2003	Rugrats Go Wild	Chuckie Finster	
2003	Kim Possible: The Secret Files	Rufus	Direct-to-DVD release
2006	Leroy & Stitch	Phantasmo, Shortstuff	TV movie, Direct-to-DVD release
2007	The Simpsons Movie	Bart Simpson, Maggie Simpson, Various characters	
2017	Captain Underpants: The First Epic Movie	Unknown	
2021	The Good, the Bart, and the Loki	Bart Simpson, Ralph Wiggum	Short film
2021	Plusaversary	Bart Simpson, Maggie Simpson	Short film
2022	When Billie Met Lisa	Bart Simpson, Maggie Simpson	Short film
2022	Welcome to the Club	Bart Simpson, Mickey Mouse	Short film
2022	The Simpsons Meet the Bocellis in 'Feliz Navidad'	Bart Simpson, Maggie Simpson, Mickey Mouse	Short film
2024	May the 12th Be with You	Maggie Simpson, Mickey Mouse	Short film
2024	The Most Wonderful Time of the Year	Bart Simpson, Nelson Muntz	Short film

==== Television ====
List of voice performances in animated television shows
Year	Title	Role	Notes
1980–84	Fat Albert	Additional characters	
1980–84	Richie Rich	Gloria Glad	
1983	Monchhichis	Additional voices	
1983–85	Shirt Tales	Kip Kangaroo	Season 2
1983–88	Alvin and the Chipmunks	Additional voices	59 episodes
1984–85	Saturday Supercade	Kimberly	Space Ace segments
1984–88	Snorks	Daffney Gillfin	
1984–85, 1994	ABC Weekend Special	Karen Winsborrow, Wally Funnybunny	3 episodes
1986	Galaxy High School	"Flat" Freddy Fender, Gilda Gossip	13 episodes
1986–87	My Little Pony 'n Friends	Various characters	
1986–87	Pound Puppies	Bright Eyes, Additional voices	26 episodes
1987	Popeye and Son	Woody	
1987	Christmas Every Day	The Little Girl	TV film
1987–89	The Tracey Ullman Show	Bart Simpson, Pat (one episode)	The Simpsons shorts and Dr. N!Godatu, respectively
1988–90	Fantastic Max	FX	15 episodes
1989	Dink, the Little Dinosaur	Additional voices	
1989–present	The Simpsons	Bart Simpson, various characters	Longest-running role; writer (1 episode, 2019)
1990	Bobby's World	Natalie	Episode: "Adventures in Bobby Sitting"
1990	Timeless Tales from Hallmark	Duckling #1, Brown Duckling #2	Episode: "The Ugly Duckling"
1990	42nd Primetime Emmy Awards	Bart Simpson	TV special
1990	The Yum Yums: The Day Things Went Sour	Peppermint Kitty, Kelly	TV special
1991	Big Bird's Birthday Celebration	Bart Simpson	TV special
1992	Raw Toonage	Fawn Deer	12 episodes
1992–93	Goof Troop	Pistol	55 episodes
1992, 2002–04	Rugrats	Chuckie Finster (2002–04), additional voices	Replaced Christine Cavanaugh
1993	The Pink Panther	Additional voices	
1993	Bonkers	Fawn Deer	5 episodes
1993	Problem Child	Betsy	
1993–96	Animaniacs	Mindy	Recurring role
1994	Aladdin	The Sprites	2 episodes
1994–95	The Critic	Margo Sherman, Bart Simpson, Various characters	23 episodes
1995	The Twisted Tales of Felix the Cat	Additional voices	
1995	Timon & Pumbaa	Pumbaa Jr.	Episode: "Never Everglades"
1996	Sesame Street	Bart Simpson	Episode: "Maria in the Hospital: Part 1"
1998	Toonsylvania	Melissa Screetch	
1998	Pinky and the Brain	Mindy	Episode: "Star Warners"
1998	What a Cartoon!	Lu	Episode: "Mike, Lu & Og in 'Crash Lancelot'"
1998	Oh Yeah! Cartoons	Bene, Beckette, Juno	2 episodes
1998–99	Pinky, Elmyra & the Brain	Rudy Mookich	Recurring role
1999	The Big Guy and Rusty the Boy Robot	Additional voices	
1999	Futurama	Bart Simpson doll	Episode: "A Big Piece of Garbage"
1999–2000	Mike, Lu & Og	Lu	Main cast
2000–05	God, the Devil and Bob	Megan Allman	13 episodes
2002	Rapsittie Street Kids: Believe In Santa	Todd	TV film; also producer
2002–07	Kim Possible	Rufus	87 episodes
2003	Kim Possible: A Sitch in Time	Rufus	TV film
2003–05	Lilo & Stitch	Phantasmo, Shortstuff, Rufus	3 episodes
2003–08	All Grown Up!	Chuckie Finster	51 episodes
2005	Kim Possible Movie: So the Drama	Rufus	TV film
2005	The Kellys	Chip Kelly	
2005, 2014	Family Guy	Daffney, Bart Simpson, Maggie Simpson, Nelson Muntz, Ralph Wiggum, Todd Flanders	2 episodes: "Brian the Bachelor", "The Simpsons Guy"
2006–09	The Replacements	Todd Daring	Main cast
2007	Random! Cartoons	Chum Chum, Kid #1	Episode: "Fanboy"
2007	Disney Channel Games	Todd	TV miniseries
2007–10	Betsy's Kindergarten Adventures	Billy	17 episodes
2010	The Cleveland Show	Bart Simpson	Episode: "Cleveland Live!"
2011–16	Poppy Cat	Chester	3 episodes
2013	Bubble Guppies	Ms. Michelle	Episode: "Get Ready for School!"
2013	American Dad!	Bart Simpson	Episode: "Faking Bad"
2014	The 7D	Goldilocks	Episode: "Goldilocks and the 7D"
2018	Top Wing	Snow Geese	Episode: "Rod's Dream of Flying"
2019	Kim Possible	Rufus	TV film
2021–26	Rugrats	Chuckie Finster	Main cast

==== Video games ====
List of voice performances in video games
Year	Title	Voice role
1991	The Simpsons Arcade Game	Bart Simpson, Maggie Simpson
1991	The Simpsons: Bart vs. the Space Mutants	Bart Simpson, Maggie Simpson
1992	The Simpsons: Bart's Nightmare	Bart Simpson
1994	Virtual Bart	Bart Simpson
1995	TerraTopia	Piper
1996	The Simpsons: Cartoon Studio	Bart Simpson, Maggie Simpson, various characters
1997	The Simpsons: Virtual Springfield	Bart Simpson, Maggie Simpson, various characters
1998	Animaniacs: Ten Pin Alley	Mindy
1999	Putt-Putt Enters the Race	Putt-Putt
1999	Simpsons Bowling	Bart Simpson, various characters
2000	Putt-Putt Joins the Circus	Putt-Putt
2001	The Simpsons Wrestling	Bart Simpson, Maggie Simpson
2001	The Simpsons: Road Rage	Bart Simpson, Maggie Simpson, various characters
2002	Rugrats: Royal Ransom	Chuckie Finster
2002	The Simpsons Skateboarding	Bart Simpson, Maggie Simpson, various characters
2003	The Simpsons: Hit & Run	Bart Simpson, Maggie Simpson, various characters
2004	Disney's Kim Possible 2: Drakken's Demise	Rufus
2005	Kim Possible: Kimmunicator	Rufus
2007	The Simpsons Game	Bart Simpson, Maggie Simpson, various characters
2012	The Simpsons: Tapped Out	Bart Simpson, Maggie Simpson, various characters
2025	Fortnite Battle Royale	Bart Simpson, Nelson Muntz
2026	Monopoly Go!	Bart Simpson

==== Music videos ====
List of voice performances in music videos
Year	Title	Role	Artist
1990	"Do the Bartman"	Bart Simpson	Herself
1991	"Deep, Deep Trouble"	Bart Simpson	Herself, Dan Castellaneta
1991	"Black or White"	Bart Simpson	Michael Jackson

==== Theme parks ====
List of voice performances in theme parks
Year	Title	Role	Venue
2008	The Simpsons Ride	Bart Simpson, Maggie Simpson, various characters	Universal Studios Florida; Orlando, FL
2008	The Simpsons Ride	Bart Simpson, Maggie Simpson, various characters	Universal Studios Hollywood; Los Angeles, CA

==== Web series ====
List of voice performances in web series
Year	Title	Role	Notes
2001	Timberwolf	Earl Squirrel	

=== Podcasts ===
Year	Title	Role	Notes
2025–present	Simpsons Declassified with Nancy Cartwright	Herself	Host

=== Producer ===
Year	Title	Role	Notes
2002	Rapsittie Street Kids: Believe in Santa	Producer	Television film
2016	Holiday Joy	Producer	Television film
2017	In Search of Fellini	Executive producer	
2022	Borrego	Producer	

=== Other credits ===
Year	Title	Role
2003	Brother Bear	Voice coach

== Awards ==
Year	Award	Category	Role	Series	Result	Ref.
1992	Primetime Emmy Award	Outstanding Voice-Over Performance	Bart Simpson	The Simpsons: "Separate Vocations"	Won	
1995	Annie Award	Outstanding Voice Acting in the Field of Animation	Bart Simpson	The Simpsons	Won	
1995	Drama-Logue Award	—	—	In Search of Fellini	Won	
2004	Daytime Emmy Award	Outstanding Performer in an Animated Program	Rufus	Kim Possible	Nominated	
2017	Primetime Emmy Award	Outstanding Character Voice-Over Performance	Bart Simpson	The Simpsons: "Looking for Mr. Goodbart"	Nominated	
2020	Primetime Emmy Award	Outstanding Character Voice-Over Performance	Bart Simpson	The Simpsons: "Better Off Ned"	Nominated	
