= Cosmic Encounter =

Science fiction board game

- Designers: Peter Olotka, Jack Kittredge, Bill Eberle, Bill Norton
- Publishers: Eon Products, Inc, West End Games, Games Workshop Mayfair Games, Avalon Hill, Fantasy Flight Games
- Players: 3–6+ (depending on edition)
- Setup time: 5–10 minutes
- Playing time: 20–120+ minutes
- Chance: Medium
- Age range: 12+
- Skills: Prediction, diplomacy, card management

Cosmic Encounter is a science fiction–themed strategy board game designed by "Future Pastimes" (collectively, Peter Olotka, Jack Kittredge and Bill Eberle, with Bill Norton) and originally published by Eon Games in 1977. In it, each player takes the role of a particular alien species, each with a unique power to bend or break one of the rules of the game, trying to establish control over the universe. The game was inducted into the Academy of Adventure Gaming Arts & Design Adventure Gaming Hall of Fame in 1997.

Cosmic Encounter is a dynamic and social game, with players being encouraged to interact, argue, form alliances, make deals, double-cross, and occasionally work together to protect the common good. Most editions of the game are designed for three to five players, although official rules exist for playing with as many as eight players.

== Gameplay ==
=== Basic rules ===
Cosmic Encounter is based on a fixed set of rules which are subsequently modified by other elements of the game.

Each player begins with a color-coded "home system" containing five planets, and twenty ships (formerly referred to as "tokens") representing starships that populate these planets as "colonies" (formerly known as "bases"). A central "warp" is used to place defeated ships for all players. The object of the game is to establish colonies on five planets outside one's home system. Each player is dealt a hand of cards from the "cosmic deck," which includes several types of cards: Attack cards with numbered values, Negotiate (formerly Compromise) cards, Reinforcement cards, and Artifact (formerly Edict) cards.

The turn player is referred to as the "offense." On a player's turn, they retrieve one ship from the warp, and then draw a card from the "Destiny" deck, containing color-coded cards which indicate which player they must have an encounter with; that player becomes the "defense." Using a special "hyperspace gate" (formerly "hyperspace cone" or simply "cone") indicator, the offense selects the planet at which the encounter will take place, and then places 1 to 4 of their ships on the gate; the defense simply defends with however many ships they have on the targeted planet. Both the offense and defense can then ask the other players individually to ally with their side; each invited player may commit up to 4 ships to either side of the conflict.

Once allies have committed, the offense and defense both select encounter cards from their hands to place face-down, then reveal them and play out the encounter based on the types of cards they used.

- If players use Attack cards, the total of the card's value and number of allied ships are added for both sides, and the side with the larger value wins, with the defending player winning in case of ties. All players involved in the encounter may play Reinforcement cards from their hands to add numerical bonuses to each side's forces. If the offense's side wins, the defense's colony is lost and all ships on the defense's side are sent to the warp, and the offense and their allies land their ships on that planet, establishing new colonies on it (or adding more ships to existing colonies there, if they already had colonies there). If the defense's side wins, all ships on the offense's side are sent to the warp, and defensive allies gain a reward of either a ship from the warp or a new card drawn from the deck for each of their ships that they sent to help defend.
- If both players use Negotiate cards, they have one minute to make a deal, such as exchanging colonies or cards from their hands, while all allies are sent back to their owners' colonies (allies get nothing in this situation). If a deal can't be made, both players lose three ships each as a penalty.
- If one player plays a Negotiate card and the other plays an Attack card, the player who played the Negotiate card immediately loses, but they get "compensation" from the victor by drawing cards from the victor's hand equal to the number of ships they lost in the battle. Allies on the Negotiate player's side do not get anything.

At the end of the offense's turn, they may have a second encounter if they won an attack or made a deal. If they can't, choose not to, or have already had two encounters this turn, then play proceeds to the next player.

=== Alien powers ===
The rules become more complex with the introduction of alien powers. These are typically drawn randomly at the start of the game and known to all players; however, variants exist where players can select their powers, use multiple powers simultaneously, or hide their powers until they are used. Each power gives the player a way to bend the core rules to their advantages, typically in one of the following ways:

- Continuous effects, such as the Macron, where each of its ships is valued as 4 instead of 1 during combat
- Combat resolution effects, such as the Void, where any ship that loses against it is removed from the game entirely instead of going to the warp
- Victory condition changes, such as Masochist, who wins if it loses all its ships
- Role-playing elements, such as the Sniveler, who, if in a losing position, may whine to the other players to gain benefits

A player's alien power is only active if they have three or more colonies in their home system, and if lost, can be regained by taking back a third colony.

The current edition of Cosmic Encounter, published by Fantasy Flight Games, includes a total of 238 aliens across all of its expansion and promo sets. In addition, many players have created their own "homemade" powers, and have posted these along with other various game extensions on the Internet.

=== Variants ===
More advanced optional game components can add further levels of complexity and unpredictability. Various editions have included varying numbers of these optional components. They include:

- Flares: Cards that grant a limited version of an alien power, or, if used by the player who possesses that power, a significant boost to their own power.
- Lux (formerly Lucre): In-game currency that allows more control of resources (such as buying more cards for one's hand or ships back from the warp).
- Moons: Special tokens which may be occupied by players, doing so grants one access to its special ability. Moon abilities can be powerful (such as retaining an alien power when it would normally be lost), while others are best described as "silly" (such as forcing the owner to speak in rhyme).
- Special planetary systems: Added in an expansion to the Eon Productions version of Cosmic Encounter and kept in the Mayfair version, the special systems have additional rules in regards to the player's initial setup, colonies, and victory conditions.
- Technologies: An array of boosts and special abilities, which must be researched (by placing ships on them) for several turns before they can be put into play. The power of technology cards varies wildly, with more powerful technologies requiring more turns to research. For example, the Xenon Lasers tech costs two ships, and its owner may change encounter totals by one point, while the Omega Missile tech costs eight ships, and destroys a planet.
- Rewards: A deck of powerful cards that can only be drawn by victorious defensive allies. Reward cards include "kickers," multipliers for encounter cards, and "rifts," booby traps that free ships from the warp, or send ships there if they are ever taken from another player's hand.
- Large group games: Official variants include rules and cards for adding a seventh or eighth player. However, with unofficial variants, the game can support as many players as the number of available player colors. With all expansions, the Mayfair Games edition has ten player colors for a ten-player game and Fantasy Flight Games' edition has eight player colors for an eight-player game, or up to 13 player colors if the translucent plastic ships from the 42nd Anniversary Edition are each included as their own color.

== History ==
The original version of Cosmic Encounter had exactly six alien powers and was designed for up to six players. This edition was nearly published by Parker Brothers in the mid-1970s; when it was not, the designers founded Eon Productions, Inc. to publish it.

The first Eon edition was released in 1977. It allowed up to four players and included fifteen alien powers. Over the next five years, Eon released nine expansions, adding sixty more alien powers, components for a fifth and sixth player, and several new types of pieces, including "Flare" cards, money (Lucre), Moons, and special power planet systems. The artwork on these early editions included images painted by Dean Morrissey. Eon published three versions of the base game, differing only in box size and cover art.

In 1986, the game was republished in the U.S. by West End Games. The game used the same deck of cards and number of players, and the same powers with five additional powers from Eon expansion sets #1 and #2. However, the cards and tokens were incompatible with the Eon edition. Meanwhile, in the UK, the game was published by Games Workshop. The GW edition supported six players, with powers from the Eon base set and some of the first three expansions.

In 1991, the game was licensed by Mayfair Games. Mayfair published Cosmic Encounter, an expansion called More Cosmic Encounter (1992), and a stripped-down introductory version of the game called Simply Cosmic (1995). The Mayfair edition revised some powers from the original Eon set, introduced many more, and significantly revised some of the existing components. It also introduced several new components. By combining the three Mayfair products, it is possible to play a 10-player game.

In 2000, Avalon Hill (by then a division of Hasbro) published a simplified version in one box with plastic pieces. While the production quality was high, this version was limited to 20 powers and four players and received no expansions.

On August 17, 2007, Fantasy Flight Games announced plans to reprint the game in 2008. Game designer Kevin Wilson gave demonstrations of Fantasy Flight's Cosmic Encounter version at Gen Con 2008, and the game was released in December. This edition included 50 aliens, flare cards, a new Technology variant, and support for 5 players. Since 2008, Fantasy Flight has released seven expansion sets:

Expansion	Release date	Aliens	Extra Player	Special Cards	Also Included
Cosmic Incursion	February 2010	20	orange	Reward deck	Rules for cosmic quakes
Cosmic Conflict	February 2011	20	black	Hazard deck	
Cosmic Alliance	March 2012	20	white	Additional cards for playing with seven or more players	Rules for team play
Cosmic Storm	August 2013	25	(none)	Space station cards	Space station tokens
Cosmic Dominion	August 2014	30	(none)	Reward deck	Ship markers for variants
Cosmic Eons	December 2016	30	(none)	Essence cards	Alliance dials
Cosmic Odyssey	July 2022	30 + 12 Alternate Timeline Aliens	(none)	Age cards, Envoy cards, Essence cards, Evolution cards, Hazard deck, Lux cards, Master cards, Moon cards, Objectives, Privilege cards, Reward deck, Station cards, Technology deck, Wrenches	Campaign rules and log, Lux tokens, Moon tokens, Station tokens

Each set of aliens includes those aliens' alien sheets and flare cards, along with any special tokens certain aliens may need. An extra player includes 20 ships, 5 planets, a colony marker, and destiny cards of the corresponding color.

In 2018, a special 42nd-anniversary edition was released by Fantasy Flight, with new box art, translucent ships, a new alien (the Demon), and a few other minor features. The new edition is still compatible with Fantasy Flight's expansions.

In 2022, Fantasy Flight published the seventh expansion for the game: Cosmic Odyssey, designed by Jack Reda, which adds a campaign mode, expands on variant from the previous expansions, and includes several new variants (some of which are reimagined versions of variants from previous editions).

A standalone two-player adaptation of the game was released in 2020. Titled Cosmic Encounter Duel, it still features a race to colonize five planets through attacks and negotiations. However, it replaces the standard game's multiplayer alliance system with virtual allies called Envoys, and increases the degree of hidden information in an encounter through methods such as giving the players rotating dials with which to secretly choose their fleet strengths.

=== Online version ===
In 2003, original designer Peter Olotka and partners launched a new version called Cosmic Encounter Online that could be played over the internet. As of 2010, this version had 35 powers, including four new aliens and two more that were designed for online play (such as Dork, which blocks other players' screens).

Cosmic Encounter Online has since been shut down. It has been superseded by Cosmic Encounter Connector, released in 2015 and available through Tabletop Simulator.

== Reception ==
=== First Eon edition (1977) and subsequent expansion sets (1978–1982) ===
In the May 1978 edition of Dragon (Issue 14), Tony Watson found the game to be "highly playable, fanciful, and very fun." Watson liked the professional quality of the game components, and admired the complex player strategies that were not immediately apparent upon reading the rules. He concluded, "Cosmic Encounter is a new type of SF game... and it hits it mark quite squarely. From both a physical and design point of view it is a very good game."

In the June–July 1978 edition of White Dwarf (Issue 7), Fred Hemmings found the game "simple to learn, and yet at the same time is so full of good ideas and potential player skill." Hemmings admired the "beautifully produced" game components, but wished that there was more than one winning objective — although he did note that using the two available expansions resulted in 35 alien races to choose from, giving a potential for more than a million combinations. He gave the game an overall rating of 8 out of 10, saying, "What makes this game is the aliens —they vary from good to excellent, and so does the game."

In the September 1978 edition of Dragon (Issue 18), Dave Minch questioned the science fiction angle of Cosmic Encounter, saying it was "nothing more than hype." When Minch delved below the SF "patina", he found a game that "combines several elements of classic, abstract games. There are cards which introduce both chance and strategy of play, as in poker or bridge. There are chips representing the bases which you must build to win the game, giving the positional and matching requirements of pit-and-pebble games, as well as a betting flavor like poker." Minch concluded with a recommendation, saying, "This is a simple game both to learn and to play. Best of all, it’s fun and pretty much open-ended."

In the inaugural edition of Ares Magazine (March 1980), Greg Costikyan rated the game 9 out of 9, saying, "The result is a weird, constantly mutating, and gripping game that does not lose its appeal even after innumerable playings. The addition of any of the four expansion sets makes Cosmic Encounter even more fascinating."

In the March 1981 edition of The Space Gamer (No. 37) Steve Jackson gave a thumbs up, saying, "I like Cosmic Encounter. It's totally original, and a lot of fun. I recommend it without reservation to gamers".

In the October 1981 edition of The Space Gamer (No. 44), Forrest Johnson thought the continued publication of expansion sets (six to that point in time) was perhaps an indication that the game was losing replay value: "Expansion sets 1 and 2 would be more valuable to a new player; Eon Products is approaching the point of diminishing returns. But sets 6 and 7 still have a lot of value for CE enthusiasts."

=== West End Games and Games Workshop editions (1986) ===
In the March 1986 edition of White Dwarf (Issue 75), Tim Wilson gave the re-issued game an overall rating of 8 out of 10, saying, "Cosmic Encounter is an easy, light-hearted game with plenty of scope for devious strategy and backstabbing... The earlier version of this game [published by Eon] proved too scarce and expensive for it to become well-known: try it now, and see why it was worth re-releasing."

Larry Trask reviewed Cosmic Encounter for Adventurer magazine and stated that "the game as a whole works very well indeed; for sheer entertainment value, Cosmic Encounter is hard to beat. Anyone who missed out on the original edition eight years ago should hurry out to buy this one."

=== Mayfair Games edition (1991) and subsequent expansion set (1993) ===
In the November 1991 edition of Dragon (Issue 175), Allen Varney gave an ebullient review, saying, "This brilliantly interactive and spectacularly fun 1977 design is my very favorite game, bar none." Varney questioned the high price of the Mayfair Games re-issue, but concluded, "You definitely will get $35 of fun out of this box. I’ve played the original Cosmic Encounter game (from the late Eon Products) over a hundred times; every game was wildly different."

Varney again gave a very positive review of the Mayfair edition in the December 1993 edition of Dragon (Issue 200), but questioned some of the new rules in Mayfair's expansion set, saying the set "offers many terrific powers (and some terribly unbalanced ones) plus new cards and forgettable rules additions like Lucre and Moons."

In 1992, a new edition of Cosmic Encounter won the Origins Award for Best Fantasy or Science Fiction Boardgame of 1991 and placed 6th in the Deutscher Spiele Preis.

=== Avalon Hill edition (2000) ===
Mark G. McLaughlin reviewed Cosmic Encounter for The Wargamer and wrote that Avalon Hill "[...] can be applauded for breathing life back into an old, out-of-print classic."

=== Retrospective ===
Cosmic Encounter was chosen for inclusion in the 2007 book Hobby Games: The 100 Best. Bruno Faidutti commented, "The box for Eon's first edition of Cosmic Encounter proclaimed 'the science-fiction game for everyone.' And, indeed, long before today's collectible card games, live-action roleplaying games, and massively multi-player online RPGs, Cosmic Encounter was the game for everyone." Quintin Smith, in a 2014 review from Eurogamer, complimented the variety of aliens, theme, entertainment value, the negotiation mechanism, and uniqueness.

== Influence ==
Cosmic Encounter was one of the first commercial board games with a simple set of core rules and a specific set of modifications to those rules for each player. The game has been described as one of the innovative games from the 1970s that influenced the development of modern board games. Future Pastimes employed this technique in some of their other designs, notably the Dune board game. Steve Jackson was influenced by Cosmic Encounter when he designed Illuminati in 1982 (each player has a special power as well as a special victory condition). This design element has become more widespread in boardgames since then; it is especially applicable to games where the players represent individual characters in a role-playing game-like situation (for example, Talisman and Arkham Horror, both originally published in the 1980s).

The possibility of an organic and completely different experience every time one plays was one of the influences in the design of the card game Magic: The Gathering. Magic designer Richard Garfield has often cited Cosmic Encounter as being influential in the design of Magic, the Gathering, going so far as to say, "[Magic's] most influential ancestor is a game for which I have no end of respect: Cosmic Encounter."
