= Borderlands (board game) =

Board game for 2-4 players

Borderlands is a board game for 2–4 players published by Eon Products in 1982.

== Gameplay ==
In designing Borderlands, the Future Pastimes team at Eon Productions wanted to create a simpler and shorter version of Diplomacy, without the need for written orders or the need to leave the table for negotiations. The game is set on an abstract continent, and players represent barbaric tribes who conquer territories, trade gathered resources, and construct cities, boats and weapons. The first player (or alliance of players) to conquer or build three cities is the winner.

The game components are:

- a 20" x 24" map divided into 36 irregular-shaped territories
- 16 counters representing available resources (coal, gold, horse breeding grounds and forests). Each resource token can be "broken" into a number of smaller tokens to be used for trading.
- 80 army counters (20 per player)
- Other counters representing horses, river boats, cities, and weapons.

The first step is to distribute the 16 resource tokens randomly across the map (no more than one per territory). Players then place their army counters on the map with regard to capturing resources, offensive and defensive operations.

After set-up, each turn is divided into five phases:

1. Development (always happens)
2. Production (may not occur)
3. Trade (may not occur)
4. Shipment (may not occur)
5. Attack (always happens)

For Phases 2, 3 and 4, a 6-sided die is rolled; on a 1–4, the phase occurs, on a 5–6, that phase is skipped. Each player can participate in each phase.

Although the game is designed for four players, there are rules for 2- and 3-player games. Games generally last 45–60 minutes.

== Legacy ==
Eon published two expansion sets, with rules for five and six players respectively that also included new resources and map expansions.

The software division of Eon created the video game Lords of Conquest based on Borderlands. It was published in 1986 by Electronic Arts for the Commodore 64, Apple II, Atari 8-bit computers, Atari ST, and IBM PC compatibles.

== Reception ==
In the December 1982 edition of The Space Gamer (Issue No. 58), Allen Varney commented that "If you like Diplomacy, but you've always had trouble getting that fifth or sixth player, you must have Borderlands at any cost. If you're a more conventional wargamer, you'll still find it exceptionally fun and challenging, though the price is a bit stiff."

In the August 1983 edition of Dragon (issue 76), although Tony Watson had issues with the high price ($20), he called it "a very good game. Its combination of simple rules, engrossing strategy, and attractive graphics make it a sure winner. Its simplicity and short playing time (a game can be finished in about two hours) make it a fine choice for an evening’s play."

Ten years later, in a retrospective article in the December 1993 edition of Dragon (issue 200), Allen Varney called Borderlands "a gripping contest of strategy, diplomacy and resource management... Intense and suspenseful."

== Reviews ==
- 1982 Games 100 in Games
- Asimov's Science Fiction v7 n13 (1983 12 Mid)
- Jeux & Stratégie #19
