= Dune (board game) =

1979 strategy board game based on Frank Herbert novel

- Cover art of 1979 edition by Chris White
- Designers: Bill Eberle; Jack Kittredge; Peter Olotka
- Illustrators: Jean Baer; Linda Bound; Fabrice Lamy Christophe Peulvast; Mick Uhl; Olivier Vatine; Chris White
- Publishers: 1979: Avalon Hill; 2019: Gale Force Nine
- Publication: 1979
- Genres: Strategy
- Players: 2–6
- Playing time: 60–180+ minutes
- Chance: Medium (card drawing)
- Age range: 14+
- Skills: Diplomacy; Resource management; Financial management; Strategy

Dune is a strategy board game set in Frank Herbert's Dune universe designed by Bill Eberle, Jack Kittredge and Peter Olotka, and originally published by Avalon Hill in 1979. In the game, each player takes on the role of a faction from the Dune universe, each with unique powers that modify the game's rules, and battle for control of the planet Arrakis. After many years out of print, the game was reissued by Gale Force Nine in 2019 in advance of the 2021 Dune film adaptation. Gale Force Nine has since released three expansions to the 2019 edition.

== History ==
The game was originally designed with a Roman Empire theme, with the name Tribute. Avalon Hill had acquired the license to produce a Dune game, but when their design proved unusable, the company contacted Eberle, Kittredge and Olotka. Elements suitable for the Dune universe were added to the game, particularly from their earlier game, Cosmic Encounter.

In 1984, to tie in with the Dune film, Avalon Hill published a second edition of the game as well as two expansions, Spice Harvest and The Duel.

The Spice Harvest expansion changes the initial setup of the standard game by adding a pre-game in which the factions lobby for control of the inter-world Spice market in order to purchase a more advantageous initial position for the start of the main game (control for the planet of Arrakis).

The Duel adds "leader tokens" representing the primary leaders of each faction and a secondary board representing a circular arena for one-on-one combat. Leaders may fight individual combat using a special deck of cards for movement and attacks.

Both supplements included additional Treachery Cards. Both supplements are also incorporated into the French edition published by Jeux Descartes.

In addition, Avalon Hill's strategy magazines, The General and Heroes, published counters and rules for three additional factions: the Bene Tleilax, the Ixians, and the Landsraad, factions and organizations that appeared in Frank Herbert's original novels.

The game received good reviews and due to the popularity of the Dune setting, coupled with the lack of new edition since 1984, became a sought-after item among board game collectors, with prices on secondary market reaching hundreds of dollars. A fan-made print-and-play version was also made available online around 2010.

In the 1990s, Jeux Descartes published a French edition of the game.

The game was reprinted by Fantasy Flight Games in 2012 as Rex: Final Days of an Empire. Fantasy Flight was able to acquire the rights to the system used in Dune (known as the “Simultaneous Dial Based Order System”), but were not able to get the license for the Dune setting. As a result, the game's setting was switched to Fantasy Flight's Twilight Imperium universe.

With the demise of Avalon Hill, Dune remained out of print for many years despite being a highly regarded board game. With newfound interest in the Dune series due to the upcoming 2021 Dune film, board game publisher Gale Force 9 reached out to the Herbert estate, which owns the general rights to the game, and received permission to remake it. The art was new for this edition, drawn by Russian illustrator "Ilya77", who was commissioned for the reuse of their art, in addition to the game's original designers, Bill Eberle, Jack Kittredge, and Peter Olotka. Gale Force 9 made very few changes of the game's original rules, tweaking about 3 to 5 percent of the rules. The game was released on October 30, 2019 in advance of the Dune cinematic reboot in late 2021. Gale Force Nine also released three expansion sets that allows players to control six additional factions, Ixians, the Tleilaxu, CHOAM, House Richese, House Ecaz, and House Moritani, co-designed by Greg Olotka and Jack Reda.

== Gameplay ==
Players take on the role of one of the factions in the politics of the planet Arrakis. Victory in the game is achieved by controlling a specified number of strongholds, either alone or in an alliance with other players.

The game board, which is based on the book's original map, represents the planet's northern hemisphere. It is divided into radial sections and territories, some of which overlap multiple radial sections. Five territories contain strongholds.

The radial divisions are used exclusively for storm movement. The planet's permanent coriolis storm moves along the radial sections, destroying any troops in its way. It is possible for a multi-radial territory to be partly in storm and partly clear.

Players move their units from territory to territory. If two or more players enter the same territory, a battle ensues and the contest is resolved using a hidden bidding system based on troop numbers, leaders, and possible treachery cards.

Spice serves as money. Each turn, one territory (determined by a card draw) produces a "spice blow", which places an amount of spice in that territory. This is one of the two ways in which all factions can earn spice for auctions, transportation, revival, and negotiating deals. The other is by winning a battle in which a leader is killed, which earns the faction the leader's value in spice.

An auction is held each turn in which players can purchase "treachery cards". These cards contain a variety of uses such as weapons and defenses, which can be used as advantages in resolving battles.

Each player has five leader tokens of varying strengths. Leaders are used in combat to supplement the strength of their units. However, each player may have one or more traitors among the other players' leaders, so using leaders can be a risk. Leaders can be killed in combat, but players may use spice to buy dead leaders back from the Bene Tleilaxu tanks.

=== Combat ===
Battle results when a territory is contested. Combat is resolved using a battle wheel, which consists of three parts: the number of troops, the leader, and any treachery cards which will be used during the battle.

Each player in the contest chooses in secret to sacrifice a number of their troops in that territory. Each unit sacrificed gives them a base score of one. Leader tokens add to the strength of their side, provided it survives the attack by the opposing leader. Attacks and defenses affecting leaders are chosen in secret by the players from their available treachery cards.

Once both players have chosen their strategies, they reveal the number of units, leaders and items used. If the player has chosen their opponent's traitor, they are defeated. Otherwise, if a player has used a weapon against which the other player has not used a defense, their opponent's leader is killed. If a laser is used against a shield, all units and leaders are killed from both sides. Otherwise, the scores are then added together, and the player with the lower score is defeated. The player with the higher score, while victorious, still must lose the number of units they planned in their strategy. In the event of a tie, the attacking player wins the battle.

=== Factions ===
Each faction has unique powers which modify the rules. Both the default abilities and the optional "Additional Character Advantages" are included below.

House Atreides
During auctions, the Atreides player may use "prescience" to view the treachery card being bid on, while other players must bid blind. The Atreides player may also use prescience to look at the next spice blow card, and force their opponents to reveal one element of their battle plan. In advanced rules, the Atreides player may bring the Kwizatz Haderach into play, which adds a bonus to the battle wheel.

The Bene Gesserit
The Bene Gesserit player may temporarily "coexist" with other players' units without causing a confrontation, which allows transportation of one unit to the polar sink free of charge for every other player's transport. The player may command other players to use or not to use certain cards during combat (representing their use of "the Voice"). At the beginning of the game the Bene Gesserit player secretly records the name of another player and the turn at which they think that other player will win the game. If the Bene Gesserit correctly guesses who will win and when, they win the game instead. In advanced rules, Bene Gesserit units are capable of extended coexistence and arrive in the same territory as the other player's transport.

The Padishah Emperor
When the other players buy treachery cards, they pay the Emperor. The player may revive up to three additional units as gholas. In advanced play, the Emperor has five elite units (Sardaukar) that are twice as effective as ordinary units, although they lose this bonus against the Fremen.

The Fremen
The Fremen armies are already on Arrakis, so they need not pay shipping costs to the Guild. They are also able to use "desert power" to move two territories per turn instead of one. Their troops are not killed if a worm appears; instead, they can ride the worm to a location of their choice. If no-one has won after ten turns and certain strongholds are either unoccupied or occupied by the Fremen, they win. In advanced play, they have three elite units (Fedaykin), and only suffer half losses from the storm.

The Spacing Guild
The Guild player receives the payment when other players transport units onto the board, while paying only half for transporting themselves. They can ship units around the planet, or even send them back to their reserves. If no-one has won after ten turns, and the Fremen don't win, the Guild does. In advanced play, they can choose to take their turn at any point during the shipping and movement phase.

House Harkonnen
When the Harkonnen player buys a treachery card, they receive a second one free, without having to show it to the Atreides player. They can hold twice as many treachery cards as other players, to a maximum of eight. Where the other players must choose one traitor out of four, the Harkonnen player can keep all four. In advanced rules, whenever they win a battle, they may kill or temporarily capture a random leader from the loser.

Each faction also grants some aspect of their powers to their allies.

=== Winning ===
In the standard ruleset, a faction wins by controlling three of the five strongholds at the end of a turn. An alliance of factions wins by controlling four of the five strongholds at the end of a turn. In a game with only two factions, the winning faction must control four strongholds.

Three other winning conditions exist:

The Fremen win at the end of turn 10 (the final round) if no faction has won the game by the normal criteria and the occupancy of certain strongholds meets certain constraints. This win condition represents a situation where the Fremen have prevented interference with their own plans for Dune.

The Guild wins if, at the end of turn 10, no faction has won via the conventional win, and the Fremen win conditions are not met. This win condition represents the situation where the Guild has preserved the status quo on Dune and may continue to provide shipping services.

The Bene Gesserit win if, after a faction or alliance has succeeded in a conventional win, they reveal that they predicted (prior to the game's start) that that faction would win in that turn. The Bene Gesserit need only predict one of the winning players in the event of an alliance win. If the Bene Gesserit cause their own alliance to win in the turn that they predicted one of their allies would win, then the Bene Gesserit alone win. This win condition represents the situation where the Bene Gesserit have manipulated the situation so that their hidden agenda is fulfilled.

The Bene Gesserit cannot predict the Fremen or Guild turn 10 default wins. However they may predict that the Fremen or the Guild will win in turn 10 by the normal majority stronghold occupancy criteria.

== Reception ==
In Issue 44 of the British wargaming magazine Perfidious Albion, Charles Vasey thought, "The game is disarmingly simple, excellent for introducing new gamers who have read the book but are not ready to go for broke. Yet it contains within it, like Cosmic Encounter, plenty of room for cunning play and dirty deeds." Vasey concluded, "Definitely a game to be played with four or more players, Dune is a very successful adaptation of the book and a good game in its own right."

In the January–February 1980 edition of The Space Gamer (Issue No. 26), Tony Watson commented that "Not only is Dune a good game, it does an amazingly accurate job of conveying the feel and air of Dune the novel."

In the inaugural edition of Ares Magazine (March 1980), Eric Goldberg gave it a below average rating of 6 out of 9, saying, "Battles are won and lost dependent on the number of spice tokens present in an area. Treachery, storms and the fearsome shai-hulud (gigantic sandworms) enliven affairs. Dune is a nice little game, but nothing special."

In Issue 77 of the UK magazine Games & Puzzles, Nick Palmer was impressed, writing, "The ability of the game to bring out the delicate power balance in the planetary power struggle depicted by the book is nothing short of extraordinary — and yet the rules occupy a mere three pages!" However, Palmer had issues with the alliance rule, which states that players in an alliance can jointly win the game. But Palmer pointed out "A strong alliance can generally win at once, and if one wants to avoid an abrupt ending it seems best to limit wins to single players. One can then employ Diplomacy-like cunning in lining up some unsuspecting allies before making a dash for victory, since allies cannot interfere with each other's plans until alliances are reviewed when the next sandworm appears." Nonetheless, Palmer game the game an Excitement rating of 5 out of 5, saying, "Dune is in my view the best game that appeared in 1979, simple, fast-moving, yet packed with strategic and tactical ingenuity."

In the December 1993 edition of Dragon (Issue 200), Allen Varney considered Dune a classic, saying "Unique flavor comes with the movement rules, combat strategies, and chances that your leaders will turn traitor." However, Varney advised "Don’t bother with the unbalanced advanced rules that Avalon Hill foisted on the clean basic design."

In a retrospective review for There Will Be Games, Jonathan Volk gave high praise to the game's unusual, asymmetrical design. In Dune, he noted, there is no artificial balance, no "Arthurian circularity" to the game table: the various player positions have wildly differing strengths and weaknesses, and the unfairness of the world setup makes "a seductive point of entry". More importantly, that unfairness presses players into complex social relations and moral quandaries rarely found in games. It's "impossibly good, better than any board game I’ve played, and I’ve played a lot of them," wrote Volk, summing up: "No game lingers with me more than Dune.

Tom Mendelsohn, in a retrospective review from Ars Technica, stated that the game was "moderately popular" during its release, but commented that the 1984 re-release was commercially unsuccessful. Mendelsohn, however, stated that the game was "ahead of its time", shown by the variable number of rounds each game. The reviewer additionally complimented the tenseness, the combat as a "state-of-the-art" mechanic that is a "battle of wits and bluffing", and praised the hidden information and "bursts of chaos". Nevertheless, the asymmetry was criticised as unappealing to some players, Mehdelsohn also stated that the rules are "full of holes and ambiguities" and that the expansions are dubiously necessary. The review also described that Rex: Final Days of an Empire was received less favourably. Similar to Mendelsohn, who commented that Dune "features more than a few rough edges courtesy of how ahead of its time it was", Luke Plunkett from Kotaku observed that the game had "rough edges", criticising that "If a major publisher was pitched Dune in 2020 they’d likely tear it to pieces, aghast at how so many of this game’s features are seemingly worthless, overpowered or both at the same time." Nonetheless, he praised that the "elastic nature" of victory conditions and "treachery lurking", and complimented the engagement in consequence of "unpredictability and unfairness".

== Other reviews and commentary ==
- Casus Belli #24 (February 1985)
- 1982 Games 100 in Games
- Analog Science Fiction and Fact

== Expansions ==
The Duel is a 1984 expansion published by The Avalon Hill Game Company. It provides optional rules for duels between character groups.

Steve Crow reviewed The Duel in The Space Gamer No. 76. Crow commented that "In all, The Duel makes an interesting supplement to the original Dune rules, but overuse of the challenge rules just bogs down the game."

The 2019 Gale Force Nine edition has released three expansions to date: Ixians & Tleilaxu, which adds two new factions, Tech Tokens and additional cards; CHOAM & Richese, which adds two more factions, Leader Skill Cards, and Advanced Stronghold Cards; and Ecaz & Moritani, which adds another two factions, Homeworld Tokens and new cards.

All three expansions were designed by Eberle, Kittridge and Olotka, along with Greg Olotka and Jack Reda.
