= Quirks (board game) =

1980 board game

Quirks is a 1980 board game published by Eon Products.

== Gameplay ==
The game components are a 108 cards printed on thin cardstock representing characteristics of animals and plants, and a game board, also printed on thin cardstock. The object of the game is to build three viable organisms called "quirks" from two or three of the cards.

== Reception ==
In the February 1981 edition of The Space Gamer (No. 36), Forrest Johnson liked Quirks, saying, "This is a good family game."

Ian Livingston reviewed Quirks for White Dwarf #24, giving it an overall rating of 9 out of 10, and stated that "All in all it is totally absurd but great fun and Eon Products must be congratulated for coming up with another ace."

In the May 1981 edition of Ares (Issue 8), Eric Goldberg found the most serious flaw in the game was an ever-diminishing replay value as players either consciously or subconsciously memorized the card values. "Quirks.. is fun only for a limited number of times. The game is quite good until that point of diminishing returns is reached."

Games magazine included Quirks in their "Top 100 Games of 1981", praising it as a "lighthearted game" involving "weird creatures and plants".

In the December 1993 edition of Dragon (Issue 200), Allen Varney gave a thumbs down to the game. "One big flaw, I think, is that [the game] never identifies players with the animals they're evolving. Instead they're unspecified creature-makers who look down on these beasts and foliage from above. Quirks would involve me a lot more by evolving me — making me the creature who needs to emerge victorious in a niche. Deciding whether to eat plants or animals, or if I should ditch my wings in favor of an electric sting — that sounds like fun."

== Reviews ==
- Jeux & Stratégie #17
