= Like Father, Like Daughter (Taxi) =

- Taxi episode
- Episode no.: Season 1 Episode 1
- Directed by: James Burrows
- Written by: James L. Brooks; Stan Daniels; David Davis; Ed. Weinberger
- Original air date: September 12, 1978

Guest appearances
- Talia Balsam as Cathy Consuelos; Jill Jaress

Episode chronology
← Previous —	Next → "One-Punch Banta"
- Taxi (season 1)

Like Father, Like Daughter is the pilot episode of the American sitcom Taxi. It originally aired on September 12, 1978. The episode was directed by James Burrows and written by series creators James L. Brooks, Stan Daniels, David Davis, and Ed. Weinberger.

== Plot ==
At the Sunshine Cab Company's fleet garage in Manhattan, the cab drivers discover that the plate on the payphone is broken, allowing people to make free calls. Everyone, except Alex Rieger (Judd Hirsch), gets in line to make a call.

Elaine Nardo (Marilu Henner) arrives and talks to Louie De Palma (Danny DeVito), the dispatcher. De Palma mistakes her for a customer and is extremely polite. However, when she tells him that she is a newly hired cab driver, Louie reverts to his usual abusive self. Elaine sits by longtime driver Alex and explains she is only working there part-time. Alex cynically points out all of the other drivers who are also working there temporarily and observes that he is the only cab driver in the place.

The other drivers then suggest that Alex make a call, even though he has stated there is nobody he wants to talk to. Eventually, he admits that he was considering calling his daughter Cathy. Everyone is surprised, as nobody knew he had a daughter. Alex reveals that he has not seen Cathy in 15 years, not since she was a baby. His ex-wife Phyllis remarried and moved to South America, telling Alex that if he really loved his daughter, he would not contact her, as that would create confusion. Alex admits that he now realizes that to be a mistake and decides to call after all.

When Alex talks to Phyllis, he learns that Cathy is on her way to college in Portugal. As her plane will make a stopover in Miami, Alex decides to meet her there. He asks to borrow a cab for the weekend, but Louie refuses to give him one. Alex, fellow drivers Bobby Wheeler (Jeff Conaway) and Tony Banta (Tony Danza), Sunshine mechanic Latka Gravas (Andy Kaufman) and bystander John Burns (Randall Carver) take one anyway and drive non-stop to Miami.

When Alex finds his daughter at Miami International Airport, he learns that Cathy has been told that he is living on a ranch in Montana and is considering running for the United States Senate. Alex then reveals his true situation. Cathy is curious about Alex, but is upset by his constantly referring to himself as her father, as she views her father to be the person who has raised her. When Alex reveals his memories of her first two years, however, she is touched. Just as she is about to board her plane, Cathy turns around and hugs Alex, and the two kiss briefly before she leaves.

Some time later, the telephone's plate is repaired, ending the free phone calls. John arrives and announces that he has gotten his hack license and is now a Sunshine cab driver.
