= Like Father, Like Daughter =

Like Father, Like Daughter may refer to:

- Like Father, Like Daughter, a novel by Anne Baker
- Like Father, Like Daughter?, a novel by Lori Copeland
- Like Father, Like Daughter, a collective reprint of issues #6-11 of Spider-Girl
- "Like Father, Like Daughter", an essay, by Abigail Garner, collected in Girls Who Like Boys Who Like Boys
- "Like Father, Like Daughter: The Beat Goes On", an article from The Mansfield News Journal about Stacy Dittrich and her father

== Live-action television ==
- Like Father, Like Daughter (TV series), a Singaporean Chinese drama
- "Like Father, Like Daughter" (Taxi), the pilot episode of Taxi
- "Like Father, Like Daughter", an episode of Coach with guest star Lisa Kudrow
- Like Father, Like Daughter (Shameless), an episode of the American TV series Shameless
- "Like Father, Like Daughter", an episode of I Am Not Okay with This

== Animated television ==
- "Like Father, Like Daughter", an episode of He-Man and the Masters of the Universe
- "Like Father, Like Daughter", an episode of The Legend of Calamity Jane
- "Like Father, Like Daughter?", an episode of Defenders of the Earth
- "Like Father, Like Daughter", an episode of Noozles

== See also ==
- Like Father, Like Son (disambiguation)
- Like Mother, Like Daughter (disambiguation)
