= Like Father Like Son =

Like Father Like Son may refer to:

== Film, television, and theater ==
- Like Father, Like Son (1961 film) or The Young Sinner, an American film by Tom Laughlin
- Like Father, Like Son (1974 film) or Massacre Mafia Style, an American film by Duke Mitchell
- Like Father Like Son (1987 film), an American comedy starring Kirk Cameron and Dudley Moore
- Like Father, Like Son (2013 film), a Japanese drama by Hirokazu Koreeda
- Like Father Like Son (TV series), a 2005 British two-episode crime drama
- Like Father, Like Son (play), a 1682 lost play by Aphra Behn
- Like Father, Like Son, a 2025 film starring Dermot Mulroney

=== Television episodes ===
- "Like Father, Like Son" (The Animals of Farthing Wood), 1994
- "Like Father, Like Son" (Breakout Kings), 2011
- "Like Father, Like Son" (Charlie & Co.), 1985
- "Like Father, Like Son" (The Dennis O'Keefe Show), 1959
- "Like Father, Like Son" (Gene Simmons Family Jewels), 2010
- "Like Father, Like Son" (Growing Pains), 1991
- "Like Father, Like Son" (The Jeffersons), 1975
- "Like Father, Like Son" (Lock-Up), 1961
- "Like Father, Like Son" (Taxi), 1981
- "Like Father, Like Son" (Three's Company), 1983

== Music ==
- Like Father, Like Son (Birdman and Lil Wayne album) or the title song, 2006
- Like Father Like Son (Ky-Mani Marley album), 1996
- Like Father, Like Son (Charles Onyeabor album), 2023
- "Like Father Like Son" (song), by Lionel Cartwright, 1989
- "Like Father, Like Son", a song by Exodus from Fabulous Disaster, 1989
- "Like Father, Like Son", a song by The Game from The Documentary, 2005
- "Like Father Like Son", a song by the Word Alive from Deceiver, 2010
- "Like Father, Like Son", a song from the Elton John and Tim Rice musical Aida, 1998

== See also ==
- Like Father, Like Sons, a 2000 album by Matthew & Gunnar Nelson
- Like Father, Like Daughter (disambiguation)
- Like Mother Like Daughter (disambiguation)
- Like Father, a 2018 American dramedy film
- Father and Son (disambiguation)
