= The Associates (American TV series) =

American sitcom television series

- Genre: Sitcom
- Created by: James L. Brooks; Stan Daniels; Charlie Hauck; Ed. Weinberger
- Developed by: Michael Leeson
- Directed by: Tony Mordente; James Burrows; Charlotte Brown; Tom Trbovich
- Starring: Wilfrid Hyde-White; Martin Short; Alley Mills; Joe Regalbuto; Shelley Smith; Tim Thomerson
- Theme music composer: Albert Brooks
- Opening theme: "Wall Street Blues" performed by B.B. King written by Albert Brooks
- Composers: Albert Brooks; Craig Safan
- Country of origin: United States
- Original language: English
- No. of seasons: 1
- No. of episodes: 13 (4 unaired)

Production
- Executive producers: James L. Brooks; Stan Daniels; Ed. Weinberger
- Producer: Michael Leeson
- Production location: Paramount Studios
- Cinematography: Leonard J. South
- Editors: Douglas Hines; C. Cory M. McCrum-Abdo
- Running time: 22 minutes
- Production companies: John-Charles-Walters Productions; Paramount Television

Original release
- Network: ABC
- Release: September 23, 1979 – April 17, 1980

The Associates is an American sitcom television series that aired on ABC from September 23, 1979, to April 17, 1980. Despite being cancelled after nine of its thirteen episodes aired, it was nominated for two Golden Globe Awards and two Primetime Emmy Awards.

== Synopsis ==
The show is centered on a group of three young novice lawyers who worked at a Wall Street law firm. Based on the novel of the same name by John Jay Osborn Jr., the series stars Martin Short, Alley Mills, Shelley Smith, as associates, Joe Regalbuto, as partner, Wilfrid Hyde-White, as senior partner, and Tim Thomerson, as mailboy/gofer.

== Cast ==
- Wilfrid Hyde-White as Emerson Marshall
- Martin Short as Tucker Kerwin
- Joe Regalbuto as Eliot Streeter
- Alley Mills as Leslie Dunn
- Shelley Smith as Sara James
- Tim Thomerson as Johnny Danko

== Production ==
The series was based on the book, The Associates, by John Jay Osborn, Jr., author of The Paper Chase, but he was "not intimately connected with it". Episode six featured guest star John Houseman reprising his role as Professor Kingsfield.

== Release ==
The Associates, from the producers of Taxi, was critically acclaimed in the fall of 1979. But, ABC-TV fell from its ratings perch that fall when they moved their schedule around. Mork & Mindy was moved to Sunday night to challenge CBS's most established night of the week. The Associates was scheduled to follow Mork & Mindy as a promising new comedy series. Mork & Mindy, however, was crushed by CBS's Archie Bunker's Place. ABC moved Mork & Mindy back to Thursday, but it would never recover its ratings glory. One Day at a Time was the direct competition to The Associates. After five episodes of The Associates, a later four weekly episodes were shown in 1980 on Thursdays at 9:30. The press heavily criticized ABC for not giving the show a chance.

== Episodes ==
No.	Title	Directed by	Written by	Original release date
1	"The First Day"	James Burrows	S : Charlie Hauck; T : Michael Leeson	September 23, 1979
The associates learn the ropes on their first day at the firm while the founder decides between two attorneys seeking partnership.
2	"Is Romance Dead?"	Tony Mordente	David Lloyd	September 30, 1979
Tucker uses tips from a book on romance to try and impress Sara.
3	"Tucker's Courtroom Coup"	Tony Mordente	David Lloyd	October 7, 1979
Marshall asks Eliot to defend a client whose ex-lover is suing him.
4	"Mr. Marshall's Love Affair"	Tony Mordente	David Lloyd	October 14, 1979
Marshall's intended helpmate flirts with Eliot.
5	"The Deadly Serve"	Tony Mordente	John Steven Owen	October 28, 1979
Eliot accidentally kills a partner in a game of squash.
6	"Eliot's Revenge"	James Burrows	S : Rich Reinhart; T : David Lloyd	March 27, 1980
Eliot argues with his former professor about a case.
7	"Danko's a Daddy"	James Burrows	David Lloyd	April 3, 1980
Johnny tries to see his illegitimate son over the mother's objections.
8	"The Censors"	Tony Mordente	Stan Daniels & Ed. Weinberger	April 10, 1980
Tucker defends a network censor being sued by a producer.
9	"The Party"	James Burrows	Earl Pomerantz	April 17, 1980
Leslie falls for a teacher who despises conservative lawyers.
10	"A Date with Johnny"	Tony Mordente	Earl Pomerantz	N/A
Johnny goes on a date with a married co-worker.
11	"Tucker's Co-Op"	Charlotte Brown	David Lloyd	N/A
Tucker moves into a co-op apartment, Marshall buys the penthouse above, and shows up unexpectedly.
12	"Inferno"	Charlotte Brown	David Lloyd	N/A
The lawyers try to find escape routes when a fire starts in the building.
13	"The Out of Town Trip"	Tom Trbovich	Rich Reinhart	N/A
The associates defend the head of a tire company accused of misusing funds, while Leslie quits the firm thinking it represents criminals.

== Syndication ==
The series had a complete run on BBC Two in the UK in 1982. The series was rerun on USA Network in 1985, A&E in 1988, followed by reruns on Comedy Central and TV Land in the 1990s.

In Italy, the series aired on Rete 4 as I novellini (Newbies) in 1982.

== Award nominations ==
Year	Award	Result	Category	Recipient
1980	Emmy Award	Nominated	Outstanding Writing in a Comedy Series	Stan Daniels and Ed. Weinberger (for episode "The Censors")
1980	Emmy Award	Nominated	Outstanding Writing in a Comedy Series	Michael Leeson and Charlie Hauck (for episode "The First Day")
1980	Golden Globe Award	Nominated	Best TV-Series - Musical/Comedy	-
1980	Golden Globe Award	Nominated	Best TV Actor - Musical/Comedy	Wilfrid Hyde-White
