= List of Taxi episodes =

Airings of the American sitcom

The following is a list of all 114 episodes of the television show Taxi.

All five seasons have been released on DVD by Paramount Home Entertainment (1–3) and CBS Home Entertainment (4–5, Complete Series).

== Series overview ==
Season	Episodes	Originally released		
Season	Episodes	First released	Last released	Network
1	22	September 12, 1978	May 15, 1979	ABC
2	24	September 11, 1979	May 13, 1980	ABC
3	20	November 19, 1980	May 21, 1981	ABC
4	24	October 18, 1981	May 6, 1982	ABC
5	24	September 30, 1982	June 15, 1983	NBC

== Episodes ==
=== Season 1 (1978–79) ===
No. overall	No. in season	Title	Directed by	Written by	Original release date
1	1	"Like Father, Like Daughter"	James Burrows	James L. Brooks & Stan Daniels & David Davis & Ed. Weinberger	September 12, 1978
In a one-time chance to catch up with his daughter Cathy (Talia Balsam) whom he has not seen in 15 years, Alex and the gang drive a cab to Miami to meet her at the airport before she moves to Portugal.
2	2	"One-Punch Banta"	James Burrows	Earl Pomerantz	September 19, 1978
Tony gets the opportunity to become a sparring partner for a middleweight boxing champion (Carlos Palomino), but he may be getting more than he bargained for. Featuring Allan Arbus.
3	3	"Blind Date"	James Burrows	Michael Leeson	September 26, 1978
Alex arranges a date with the charming voice on Bobby's answering service, but is disappointed to meet an unattractive, gruff and surly woman (Suzanne Kent) in person. Bobby, Tony and John try to decide who rightfully deserves the large sum of money which Latka found in the back of one of the cabs.
4	4	"Bobby's Acting Career"	James Burrows	Ed. Weinberger and Stan Daniels	October 3, 1978
After giving himself three years to break into the acting business, Bobby goes on a hurried audition spree in the hours before his own personal deadline expires. Alex confiscates a dog from his abusive owner.
5	5	"Come as You Aren't"	James Burrows	Glen Charles & Les Charles	October 10, 1978
Elaine throws a party to impress her art gallery contacts but fears her high-class guests will discover she is a taxi driver.
6	6	"The Great Line"	James Burrows	Earl Pomerantz	October 17, 1978
John picks up a pretty woman (Ellen Regan) at a bar, and everyone is shocked when he returns from his date a married man.
7	7	"High School Reunion"	James Burrows	Sy Rosen	October 24, 1978
Louie is afraid to face his old classmates at his 20-year high school reunion so Bobby offers to impersonate him ("I shot up in college") and attend the reunion in his place.
8	8	"Paper Marriage"	James Burrows	Story by : Barton Dean; Teleplay by : Glen Charles & Les Charles	October 31, 1978
Faced with deportation, Latka marries a call girl, Vivian Harrow (Rita Taggart), in a quickie ceremony conducted by the bizarre Reverend Jim "Iggy" Ignatowski (Christopher Lloyd, in his first Taxi appearance).
9	9	"Money Troubles"	James Burrows	Earl Pomerantz	November 14, 1978
John and his new wife entertain Alex and Latka for dinner, where their financial situation exposes tension just below the surface.
10	10	"Men Are Such Beasts"	James Burrows	Ed. Weinberger and Stan Daniels	November 21, 1978
Tony has trouble breaking up with his obsessive, pill-popping girlfriend (Gail Edwards), and Alex gets into an accident.
11	11	"Memories of Cab 804: Part 1"	James Burrows	Barry Kemp	November 28, 1978
The cabbies tell stories about an old cab nearing a half-million miles on the road that has just been wrecked. Aside from the preview for Part 2, Andy Kaufman does not appear in this episode.
12	12	"Memories of Cab 804: Part 2"	James Burrows	Barry Kemp	December 5, 1978
The cabbies continue their stories about their experiences with the recently wrecked Cab 804. Features Tom Selleck and Mandy Patinkin.
13	13	"A Full House for Christmas"	James Burrows	Barry Kemp	December 12, 1978
At Christmas time, Louie's brother Nick (Richard Foronjy) visits, but infuriates Louie when he refuses to spend much time with their mother. Louie talks Alex into challenging Nick to a poker game, hoping for revenge. This was supposed to be the "Tony Clifton" episode in which he "guest starred" (hence Latka's absence) as Louie's brother, but Clifton was fired from the show and Foronjy was hired instead.
14	14	"Sugar Mama"	James Burrows	Glen Charles & Les Charles	January 16, 1979
Alex picks up a friendly rich elderly woman (Ruth Gordon) who gives him presents and large tips. Andy Kaufman does not appear in this episode.
15	15	"Friends"	James Burrows	Earl Pomerantz	January 30, 1979
Tony goes to Scranton, Pennsylvania to take part in a boxing match, which he loses. He trusts the care of his two pet fish to Bobby, who neglects to feed them, and they die. Tony refuses to forgive him, so Alex steps in to help repair their friendship.
16	16	"Louie Sees the Light"	James Burrows	Ruth Bennett	February 6, 1979
Louie goes to the hospital for an operation and promises God he will turn a new leaf when he comes back to work.
17	17	"Elaine and the Lame Duck"	James Burrows	Glen Charles & Les Charles	February 13, 1979
Alex picks up a Congressman (Jeffrey Tambor) who cannot find a date, so Alex fixes him up with Elaine.
18	18	"Bobby's Big Break"	James Burrows	Barry Kemp	February 15, 1979
Bobby lands a small part on a soap opera, due to which he feels confident enough to quit his taxi driving job.
19	19	"Mama Gravas"	James Burrows	Glen Charles & Les Charles	February 27, 1979
Alex has a one-night stand with Latka's attractive mother (Susan Kellermann). Upon finding out, Latka expects Alex to marry her. When he refuses to, Latka calls off their friendship. This is the last episode of the first season to feature Andy Kaufman.
20	20	"Alex Tastes Death and Finds a Nice Restaurant"	James Burrows	Michael Leeson	March 6, 1979
Alex is robbed and shot in the ear on his route, causing him to quit his job in fear. He takes a job as a waiter at an upmarket restaurant, but soon returns to his old job.
21	21	"Hollywood Calling"	James Burrows	Glen Charles & Les Charles	May 8, 1979
A Hollywood producer (Martin Mull) comes to the garage looking for "real" cab drivers for a movie. It is up to Louie to decide if the movie is shot in the garage.
22	22	"Substitute Father"	James Burrows	Barry Kemp	May 15, 1979
Elaine needs to see her sick aunt for a few days, but cannot take her son (Michael Hershewe) because he is competing in a spelling bee. The entire male cabbie staff takes turns looking after him.

=== Season 2 (1979–80) ===
No. overall	No. in season	Title	Directed by	Written by	Original release date
23	1	"Louie and the Nice Girl"	James Burrows	Earl Pomerantz	September 11, 1979
Zena Sherman (Rhea Perlman, in her first Taxi appearance) falls for Louie, but Louie doesn't know how to date a nice girl. Andy Kaufman does not appear in this episode.
24	2	"Honor Thy Father"	James Burrows	Glen Charles & Les Charles	September 18, 1979
Alex learns from his sister (Joan Hackett) that his estranged father (Jack Gilford) has suffered a heart attack, and has to be convinced to visit him at the hospital.
25	3	"Reverend Jim: A Space Odyssey"	James Burrows	Glen Charles & Les Charles	September 25, 1979
The cabbies meet Reverend Jim at a restaurant, and get him a job as a cab driver. Jim then spreads his special brand of reality around the garage. In 1997, TV Guide ranked this episode #63 on its list of the 100 Greatest Episodes. In 2009, it moved to #51.
26	4	"Nardo Loses Her Marbles"	James Burrows	Earl Pomerantz	October 2, 1979
Elaine has a chance to move up at the art gallery, so she burns the candle at both ends and begins to show signs of the stress. She goes to a psychiatrist (Tom Ewell) to prove that she is okay.
27	5	"Wherefore Art Thou Bobby?"	James Burrows	Barry Kemp	October 16, 1979
Bobby considers quitting acting after he meets a young actor-wannabe who just moved to New York and immediately lands a leading role in an off-Broadway play.
28	6	"The Lighter Side of Angela Matusa"	James Burrows	Earl Pomerantz	October 23, 1979
Alex is revisited by a now slimmer Angela Matusa (Suzanne Kent), whose romantic interest in him has grown since she last saw him a year ago. Andy Kaufman does not appear in this episode.
29	7	"A Woman Between Friends"	James Burrows	Ken Estin	October 30, 1979
Bobby and Tony become embattled in a fierce competition for the affections of a beautiful girl (Constance Forslund) they both met and asked out at Mario's.
30	8	"The Great Race"	James Burrows	Glenn Gordon Caron	November 6, 1979
Alex and Louie engage in a friendly competition to see who can take in the most money. If Louie wins he gets a date with Elaine.
31	9	"The Apartment"	James Burrows	Barry Rubinowitz	November 13, 1979
After his apartment complex is torn down, Latka unknowingly signs a lease to live in a luxurious penthouse that costs $3,000 a month. Realizing that Latka will have to move out after a month, the cabbies decide to spend every minute enjoying the perks of the apartment.
32	10	"Alex's Romance"	Ed. Weinberger	Ian Praiser & Howard Gewirtz	November 20, 1979
Alex embarks on a romance with a fragile former soap star (Dee Wallace) who is reluctant to get into a long-term relationship. Christopher Lloyd (not seen since his re-introduction in "Reverend Jim: A Space Odyssey") becomes a full-time regular starting with this episode.
33	11	"Latka's Revolting"	James Burrows	Glen Charles & Les Charles	November 27, 1979
After Latka's country erupts into a civil war, he feels that he has an obligation to go home and join the revolution. Lenny Baker guest stars as Latka's fellow countryman Baschi.
34	12	"Elaine's Secret Admirer"	James Burrows	Barry Kemp	December 4, 1979
Elaine is intrigued when a secret admirer sends her several romantic poems. She soon realizes that it must be someone in the garage. Andy Kaufman does not appear in this episode, although Latka is mentioned.
35	13	"Louie Meets the Folks"	James Burrows	Barry Kemp	December 11, 1979
Fearing that Zena will break up with him, Louie finally decides to meet her parents (John C. Becher and Camila Ashland). He then pays Alex to accompany him and make sure that he doesn't step out of line. Andy Kaufman does not appear in this episode.
36	14	"Jim Gets a Pet"	James Burrows	David Lloyd	December 18, 1979
Jim has a good day at the track and decides to spend his winnings on a pet horse (Danny-Boy).
37	15	"The Reluctant Fighter"	James Burrows	Ken Estin	December 25, 1979
Tony is initially excited about fighting a former champ whose best days are behind him. His excitement turns to doubt when he realizes that the champ is dedicating the fight to a kid in a wheel-chair. Tony Danza's son, Marc Danza, plays the role of Brian Sims. Andy Kaufman and Christopher Lloyd do not appear in this episode. Famous martial artist and stuntman Gene Lebell appears as the referee during Tony's boxing match.
38	16	"Tony and Brian"	James Burrows	Ken Estin	January 8, 1980
Tony is shattered when a kid that he wants to adopt decides to go with a wealthy couple. Tony Danza's son, Marc Danza, returns as Brian Sims. Andy Kaufman does not appear in this episode.
39	17	"Guess Who's Coming for Brefnish"	James Burrows	Barry Kemp	January 15, 1980
Latka falls for Simka (Carol Kane in her first Taxi appearance), a girl from his native land, but prejudice gets in the way when it turns out she is one of the "mountain people," the most hated group in his country.
40	18	"What Price Bobby?"	James Burrows	Ken Estin	January 22, 1980
Bobby's acting career is on the rise after he starts having an affair with his new agent (Susan Sullivan). Judd Hirsch was only featured in the episode's final scene, separate from the main cast, as he was filming Ordinary People.
41	19	"Shut It Down: Part 1"	James Burrows	Story by : Mark Jacobson & Michael Tolkin; Teleplay by : Howard Gewirtz & Ian Praiser	January 29, 1980
Elaine is elected shop steward in a labor dispute, which might require some creative negotiations with lascivious Louie. Andy Kaufman is absent for both episodes of this two-part story.
42	20	"Shut It Down: Part 2"	James Burrows	Howard Gewirtz & Ian Praiser	February 5, 1980
Louie finally gets his date with Elaine, and TV audiences get the kiss they can never forget.
43	21	"Alex Jumps Out of an Airplane"	James Burrows	Ken Estin	February 26, 1980
Following an excitement-filled ski trip, Alex decides to start living life to the fullest, which includes skydiving for the first time. Andy Kaufman does not appear in this episode.
44	22	"Art Work"	James Burrows	Glen Charles & Les Charles	March 4, 1980
Elaine convinces the cabbies to pool their money and buy a valuable painting as an investment. But to raise the cash, they’ll have to make a deal with the devil — Louie.
45	23	"Fantasy Borough: Part 1"	James Burrows	Barry Kemp	May 6, 1980
When Tony meets Fantasy Island's Hervé Villechaize, it inspires the cabbies to describe their fantasies.
46	24	"Fantasy Borough: Part 2"	James Burrows	Barry Kemp	May 13, 1980
The fantasies continue in this conclusion to the season, culminating in Elaine's splashy production number to the song "Lullaby of Broadway."

=== Season 3 (1980–81) ===
No. overall	No. in season	Title	Directed by	Written by	Original release date
47	1	"Louie's Rival"	James Burrows	Ken Estin	November 19, 1980
Louie fears the worst when Zena (Rhea Perlman) confesses she has been dating someone else. Andy Kaufman does not appear in this episode
48	2	"Tony's Sister and Jim"	James Burrows	Michael Leeson	November 26, 1980
Tony Banta's newly divorced sister, Monica (Julie Kavner), falls in love with Jim Ignatowski, much to Tony's dismay.
49	3	"Fathers of the Bride"	James Burrows	Barry Kemp	December 3, 1980
Alex is upset when his ex-wife (Louise Lasser) purposely keeps him out of the wedding of their daughter (Talia Balsam), so he takes Elaine along with him to crash the reception. Andy Kaufman does not appear in this episode.
50	4	"Elaine's Strange Triangle"	James Burrows	David Lloyd	December 10, 1980
Elaine's dating a man who, unknown to her, is bisexual and attracted to Tony. Tony begs for Alex's help in letting the man down easy.
51	5	"Going Home"	James Burrows	Glen Charles & Les Charles	December 17, 1980
After a private investigator tracks him down regarding a family matter, Jim and Alex pay a visit to Jim's wealthy father (Victor Buono). Strange siblings aside, Jim faces hostility from his Dad over his outsider lifestyle. Andy Kaufman is absent for this episode.
52	6	"The Ten-Percent Solution"	James Burrows	Pat Allee	January 7, 1981
With Bobby's acting career going nowhere, he takes Tony Banta under his wing and acts as his agent.
53	7	"Call of the Mild"	James Burrows	Katherine Green	January 21, 1981
Alex, Tony, Bobby, and Jim end up stranded without provisions in a mountain cabin. Andy Kaufman does not appear in this episode.
54	8	"Latka's Cookies"	James Burrows	Glen Charles & Les Charles	February 5, 1981
Latka inherits his grandmother's oatmeal cookie recipe, which he plans to mass-market because the cookies are addictive – literally. The gang at the taxi company partake of the sweet treats and all act...a little strangely. Well-known chocolate chip cookie magnate Wally "Famous" Amos appears as himself during Latka's drug-withdrawal hallucination.
55	9	"Thy Boss's Wife"	James Burrows	Ken Estin	February 12, 1981
The boss's wife (Eileen Brennan) invites Louie over for an affair so she can get back at her husband. Louie fears the worst after remembering that her last fling, a cabbie named "Curly" Melnick, has not been heard from since. Andy Kaufman does not appear in this episode.
56	10	"The Costume Party"	James Burrows	David Lloyd	February 19, 1981
The gang crash a party which they believe has famous actors in attendance.
57	11	"Elaine's Old Friend"	Jeff Chambers	Susan Jane Lindner & Nancy Lane	February 26, 1981
Elaine makes up an imaginary boyfriend, "Bill Board," to impress a wealthy and successful former school friend (Martha Smith), and Alex pretends to be Bill.
58	12	"Out of Commission"	James Burrows	Sam Simon	March 12, 1981
Tony is informed that he can no longer box due to the risk of brain damage. Andy Kaufman does not appear in this episode.
59	13	"Zen and the Art of Cab Driving"	Will Mackenzie	Glen Charles & Les Charles	March 19, 1981
After Jim picks up a couple of businessmen at the airport, he realizes that his life is missing something. Focusing on being the best cab driver he can be, Jim breaks company trip sheet records in an effort to amass enough wealth to achieve a special goal which he reveals to his fellow drivers.
60	14	"Louie's Mother"	James Burrows	Katherine Green	March 26, 1981
After Louie places his mother in a nursing home, he realizes that his vision of living without her was not as good as it seemed. The part of Louie's mother is played by Julia DeVito, Danny DeVito's actual mother.
61	15	"Bobby's Roommate"	James Burrows	Earl Pomerantz	April 9, 1981
Elaine stays with Bobby, leading Alex and others to suspect they're having an affair.
62	16	"Louie Bumps Into an Old Lady"	James Burrows	David Lloyd	April 16, 1981
After Louie hits an old lady (Iris Korn) with his cab, she takes the Sunshine Cab Company to court for a million dollars. Louie soon realizes that he has a strong case against her when Alex remembers from a prior experience that she is a known con artist. Andy Kaufman does not appear in this episode.
63	17	"Bobby and the Critic"	James Burrows	Barry Kemp	April 30, 1981
After reading the newspaper and seeing another nasty review of a play by powerful critic, John Bowman (John Harkins), Bobby decides to compose a letter attacking Bowman, only to reconsider and throw it in the trash. When Louie recovers the letter and sends it to the newspaper, it unexpectedly creates positive buzz for Bobby and his acting career.
64	18	"On the Job: Part 1"	James Burrows	Dennis Danzinger & Ellen Sandler	May 7, 1981
After the Sunshine Cab Company goes bankrupt, the gang decides to meet at Mario's a month later to tell stories about their new jobs.
65	19	"On the Job: Part 2"	James Burrows	Dennis Danzinger & Ellen Sandler	May 14, 1981
With the Sunshine Cab Company still closed, the former employees continue to share stories of their new jobs.
66	20	"Latka the Playboy"	James Burrows	Glen Charles & Les Charles	May 21, 1981
Latka creates a suave but obnoxious alter ego, Vic Ferrari, to help him score with the ladies. However, nobody likes his new persona, and Alex tries to convince him to bring the old Latka back. In 1997, TV Guide ranked this episode #19 on its list of the 100 Greatest Episodes.

=== Season 4 (1981–82) ===
No. overall	No. in season	Title	Directed by	Written by	Original release date
67	1	"Jim the Psychic"	James Burrows	Story by : Holly Holmberg Brooks; Teleplay by : Barry Kemp	October 8, 1981
Jim has psychic visions of the future and predicts that Alex will meet a horrible fate involving a blonde woman. Meanwhile, Latka and Tony feud, leading to the former losing a 'silence for a week' bet, but Latka finds clever ways to get around it. One of two episodes originally produced for the third season but held over. Jeff Conaway's first of three appearances this season.
68	2	"Vienna Waits"	Howard Storm	Ken Estin	October 15, 1981
When Alex and Elaine take a European vacation together, she has plenty of luck with the men and he has none with the women. The first episode produced for the fourth season, and the first without Jeff Conaway. Andy Kaufman does not appear.
69	3	"Mr. Personalities"	Howard Storm	Ian Praiser & Howard Gewirtz	October 22, 1981
Latka's multiple personalities are getting worse: In addition to Vic Ferrari, he becomes Arlo the drawling cowboy, and...Alex Reiger. To the amazement of all his friends, he starts living Alex's life better than he did.
70	4	"Jim Joins the Network"	Noam Pitlik	David Lloyd	October 29, 1981
A television executive (Martin Short) uses Jim's psychic abilities to help him choose programs for a major network. Meanwhile, Louie has a minor rodent problem, so Elaine, her kids and Tony literally build a better mousetrap to deal with it. Andy Kaufman does not appear in this episode.
71	5	"Louie's Fling"	James Burrows	Sam Simon	November 5, 1981
After Louie has an affair with Zena's friend Emily (Andrea Marcovicci), he wants to live out his dream by dating both women at once. In an early scene, the TV show Louie is watching is playing "Haute Couture", a piece of music by Heinz Kiessling later used as the opening theme for the series Danny DeVito would star in 25 years later, It's Always Sunny In Philadelphia. Andy Kaufman is absent from this episode
72	6	"Like Father, Like Son"	James Burrows	David Lloyd	November 12, 1981
Alex and his estranged father become involved with the same woman. Andy Kaufman does not appear in this episode.
73	7	"Louie's Mom Remarries"	James Burrows	Earl Pomerantz	November 19, 1981
Louie is furious when his mother announces her engagement to a Japanese man (played by Jerry Fujikawa). Louie's mother returns, played again by Julie DeVito, Danny DeVito's actual mother.
74	8	"Fledgling"	James Burrows	Ken Estin	November 26, 1981
Elaine tries to help an artist (Paul Sand) who refuses to leave his apartment. This episode, originally produced for the third season, was Jeff Conaway's last episode as a regular. Andy Kaufman does not appear.
75	9	"Of Mice and Tony"	James Burrows	Glen Charles & Les Charles	December 10, 1981
Tony becomes the manager for an up-and-coming fighter (Ernie Hudson). Series co-producer and writer Ian Praiser appears briefly as Dr. Harmon at the end of the episode
76	10	"Louie Goes Too Far"	Michael Lessac	Danny Kallis	December 17, 1981
Elaine calls the National Organization For Women on Louie after she catches him peeping at her while she's undressing. Beginning with this episode, Louie's direct superior, MacKenzie, has been replaced by one Mr. Ratledge, presumably after the taxi company went broke in the previous season. Unlike MacKenzie, Ratledge is seen, but not until Season 5.
77	11	"I Wanna Be Around"	James Burrows	Glen Charles & Les Charles	January 7, 1982
After seeing a Donahue show about the threat of nuclear war, Louie holds an apocalypse preparedness drill in the garage. This episode marks J. Alan Thomas's first motion footage end credit as Jeff, and the episode with, by a large margin, the most involvement of the character to date. Andy Kaufman is absent.
78	12	"Bobby Doesn't Live Here Anymore"	James Burrows	Glen Charles & Les Charles	January 14, 1982
Bobby returns from Hollywood to announce that he's gotten a part on a TV pilot. When the pilot is picked up as a series, his part is recast, but the gang encourages him to return to Hollywood and continue to follow his dream. This episode is Jeff Conaway's final appearance on the series.
79	13	"Nina Loves Alex"	Joan Darling	David Lloyd	January 21, 1982
A cheerful young cabbie (Charlayne Woodard) challenges Alex's sour worldview when she falls in love with him. Andy Kaufman does not appear in this episode
80	14	"Tony's Lady"	Michael Zinberg	Ken Estin	January 28, 1982
Tony falls for the beautiful, rich woman (Rebecca Holden) he's been hired to chauffeur. Meanwhile, Latka and his alternate personality Vic Ferrari enter into an escalating feud.
81	15	"Simka Returns"	Michael Zinberg	Howard Gewirtz & Ian Praiser	February 4, 1982
Latka's ex-girlfriend Simka is free again, but Latka's attempts to reconnect with her are stymied when she seems to prefer his alter ego, Vic Ferrari.
82	16	"Jim and the Kid"	Michael Zinberg	David Lloyd	February 11, 1982
Jim meets a boy who's run away from home and decides to raise him himself. Andy Kaufman does not appear in this episode.
83	17	"Take My Ex-Wife, Please"	Noam Pitlik	Ian Praiser & Howard Gewirtz	February 18, 1982
Alex's ex-wife (Louise Lasser), dumped by her second husband, rebounds by dating the most unsuitable person imaginable: Louie.
84	18	"The Unkindest Cut"	Noam Pitlik	Story by : Barbara Duncan & Holly Holmberg Brooks; Teleplay by : Sam Simon	February 25, 1982
A snooty hairdresser (Ted Danson) gives Elaine a terrible hairstyle and insults her when she complains. Her friends go back to the salon to help her get revenge. Meanwhile, Louie introduces a Pac-Man arcade machine to the garage, and Jim becomes obsessed. Andy Kaufman does not appear in this episode.
85	19	"Tony's Comeback"	Michael Lessac	Sam Simon	March 4, 1982
After a new cabby fires his ambition once again, Tony tries to re-enter the world of boxing. NFL legend Bubba Smith guest stars. Gene Lebell returns as a boxing referee during Tony's match. Andy Kaufman does not appear.
86	20	"Elegant Iggy"	Noam Pitlik	Ken Estin	March 18, 1982
Elaine reluctantly brings Jim along to a high-society party.
87	21	"The Wedding of Latka and Simka"	James Burrows	Howard Gewirtz & Ian Praiser	March 25, 1982
Latka and Simka announce their engagement, but to get married according to the customs of their country, they have to pass a series of tests of their love. Famous psychologist and writer Dr Joyce Brothers appears as herself. Susan Kellerman returns as Latka's mother.
88	22	"Cooking for Two"	James Burrows	Ken Estin & Sam Simon	April 8, 1982
When a wrecking ball destroys Jim's apartment, he moves in with Louie and promptly burns down Louie's apartment.
89	23	"The Road Not Taken: Part 1"	James Burrows	Ken Estin & Sam Simon	April 29, 1982
When Elaine considers leaving for a better job in Seattle, her friends talk about the decisions that changed the course of their lives. Tom Hanks guest stars.
90	24	"The Road Not Taken: Part 2"	James Burrows	Ian Praiser & Howard Gewirtz	May 6, 1982
The cabbies continue to talk about their crucial decisions and Elaine gets news about her dream job. Max Wright guest stars. Susan Kellerman returns once more as Latka's mother. The picture of Latka's father on the wall of the Gravas cabin is a portrait-sized photo of a bearded Andy Kaufman. This was the last first-run episode to air on ABC, since the show was canceled by the network and eventually picked up by NBC.

=== Season 5 (1982–83) ===
No. overall	No. in season	Title	Directed by	Written by	Original release date
91	1	"Love Un-American Style" "The Shloogel Show"	Noam Pitlik	Ken Estin and Sam Simon	September 30, 1982
Latka and Simka try to match up each of their single friends with his or her perfect mate, including Louie with a blind girl, Elaine with nerdy Arnie (Wallace Shawn), and Jim with Marcia Wallace.
92	2	"Jim's Inheritance"	Noam Pitlik	Ken Estin	October 7, 1982
Jim's father dies and unexpectedly leaves him millions of dollars, but Jim's brother has him declared legally incompetent to handle the money himself. Dick Sargent guest stars. Andy Kaufman and Carol Kane do not appear in this episode.
93	3	"Alex Goes Off the Wagon"	Noam Pitlik	Danny Kallis	October 14, 1982
Alex slips back into his addictive gambling habits after a trip to Atlantic City. Carol Kane and Andy Kaufman are absent.
94	4	"Scenskees from a Marriage: Part 1"	Noam Pitlik	Howard Gewirtz & Ian Praiser	October 21, 1982
Latka sleeps with a female cabbie (Allyce Beasley) to keep from freezing to death during a snowstorm. When Simka finds out, their priest (Vincent Schiavelli) declares that the only way to right this wrong is for her to sleep with one of his friends.
95	5	"Scenskees from a Marriage: Part 2"	Noam Pitlik	Ian Praiser & Howard Gewirtz	October 28, 1982
Simka selects Alex as the man she must sleep with to compensate for Latka's infidelity. When Alex refuses, the only option left is divorce.
96	6	"Crime and Punishment"	Stan Daniels	Katherine Green	November 4, 1982
When Louie's theft from the company is discovered, he pins the crime on his assistant Jeff (J. Alan Thomas). Carol Kane and Andy Kaufman do not appear.
97	7	"Alex the Gofer"	Michael Lessac	David Lloyd	November 11, 1982
Alex fulfills his dream of working in theatre when he becomes a gofer for two obnoxious Broadway producers (Matthew Laurance and David Paymer).
98	8	"Louie's Revenge"	Stan Daniels	Sam Simon	November 18, 1982
Louie plans to get revenge on Emily (Andrea Marcovicci), the woman who broke up his romance with Zena and then dumped him. Carol Kane and Andy Kaufman do not appear.
99	9	"Travels with My Dad"	Michael Zinberg	Barton Dean	November 25, 1982
Tony gets a chance to know his father (Donnelly Rhodes) when they work together on a ship. Carol Kane and Andy Kaufman are absent.
100	10	"Elaine and the Monk"	Danny DeVito	David Lloyd	December 2, 1982
Elaine falls in love with Simka's cousin Zifka (Mark Blankfield), who is a monk with one week off from his vow of silence.
101	11	"Zena's Honeymoon"	Richard Sakai	David Lloyd	December 9, 1982
Louie's hope of getting back together with Zena is shattered when he finds she's getting married. This episode marks the final appearance of Zena Sherman (Rhea Perlman). Carol Kane and Andy Kaufman are absent.
102	12	"Get Me Through the Holidays"	Michael Zinberg	Ken Estin & Sam Simon	December 16, 1982
Alex's ex-wife (Louise Lasser) is particularly depressed during the holiday season and suggests getting back together with Alex. This is the last of Louise Lasser's three appearances as Alex's ex-wife.
103	13	"Louie Moves Uptown"	Michael Zinberg	David Lloyd	January 22, 1983
Louie tries to move into a co-op apartment where the snobbish tenants' panel has just rejected Penny Marshall as unsuitable.
104	14	"Alex's Old Buddy"	Richard Sakai	Ken Estin & Sam Simon	January 29, 1983
Alex must accept that his old dog Buddy is not long for this world.
105	15	"Sugar Ray Nardo"	Danny DeVito	Katherine Green	February 5, 1983
Elaine is upset when her son gives up his music studies and wants to take boxing lessons from Tony. Andy Kaufman and Carol Kane do not appear in this episode.
106	16	"A Taxi Celebration"	Unknown	Unknown	March 23, 1983
107	17	"A Taxi Celebration"	Unknown	Unknown	March 23, 1983
Danny DeVito hosts a one-hour collection of memorable clips from Taxi in this retrospective.
108	18	"Alex Gets Burned by an Old Flame"	Harvey Miller	Barton Dean	March 30, 1983
Alex finds that the woman he's crazy about (Catherine Shirriff) is actually in love with Jim. Andy Kaufman and Carol Kane are absent from this episode.
109	19	"Louie and the Blind Girl"	Noam Pitlik	Story by : Larry Scott Anderson; Teleplay by : Ken Estin & Sam Simon & Al Aidekman	April 6, 1983
Louie's blind girlfriend (Murphy Cross) is about to have an operation that will restore her sight, and he's afraid of what her reaction will be when she sees him.
110	20	"Arnie Meets the Kids"	Richard Sakai	John Markus	April 13, 1983
Arnie (Wallace Shawn) tries to get on Elaine's good side by bribing her children to like him.
111	21	"Tony's Baby"	Richard Sakai	Dari Daniels	April 20, 1983
Tony's girlfriend announces that she's pregnant. Features Keenan Wynn as Tony's boxing manager. Gene Lebelle returns for the last time as the boxing match referee. Carol Kane and Andy Kaufman are absent.
112	22	"Jim's Mario's"	Danny DeVito	Ken Estin & Sam Simon	May 18, 1983
Jim gets permission from his brother to use some of his millions to make an investment, so he buys the cabbies' favorite hangout, Mario's. Andy Kaufman does not appear in this episode. Walter Olkewicz returns as Jim's brother, Tom.
113	23	"A Grand Gesture"	Noam Pitlik	Ken Estin & Sam Simon	May 25, 1983
To show how wonderful it feels to give away money, Jim gives each of his friends $1000 on condition that they will immediately give it to another person. Vincent Schiavelli returns for a third and final time as Reverend Gorky.
114	24	"Simka's Monthlies"	Harvey Miller	Holly Holmberg Brooks	June 15, 1983
Simka's premenstrual syndrome affects her behavior just before her immigration hearing.
