= John Charles Walters Productions =

Former television production company

- Type: Private
- Industry: Television
- Founded: 1978; 48 years ago
- Founders: James L. Brooks; David Davis; Stan Daniels; Ed. Weinberger
- Defunct: 1983; 43 years ago
- Fate: Closed
- Successor: Gracie Films; Charles Burrows Charles Productions
- Key people: James L. Brooks
- Products: Taxi (TV series)

John Charles Walters Productions (a.k.a. John Charles Walters) was an American production company formed in 1978 by four former employees of MTM Enterprises: James L. Brooks, David Davis, Stan Daniels and Ed. Weinberger. The company existed from 1978 until 1983 and produced the TV show Taxi.

The foursome who created John Charles Walters were part of the creative team that produced The Mary Tyler Moore Show and its spinoff Phyllis, as well as The Betty White Show among others, during the 1970s. They were lured away by Paramount following the end of The Mary Tyler Moore Show's run. Paramount financed the John Charles Walters Company during its existence.

The company also produced The Associates, a TV sitcom about a small group of young Wall Street lawyers which ran during the 1979 television season starring Martin Short. The show lasted for nine of the 13 episodes produced, but received two Primetime Emmy Award nominations, two Golden Globe Award nominations and one Writers Guild of America Award nomination after its cancelation.

In 1982, Glen and Les Charles and James Burrows split away from John Charles Walters Productions to form Charles Burrows Charles Productions, but remained at Paramount.

== Company name ==
According to a 2003 interview, James L. Brooks said that the company was named John Charles Walters because the foursome "wanted a venerable Protestant name." The book Hailing Taxi indicates that the partners discovered an old pub sign that said "Charles Walters." They bought it in order to make it their logo, but then discovered that there was a director in Hollywood named Charles Walters. They added the name John to avoid legal problems.

A representation of Walters appears at the end of Taxi, The Associates and the 1978 telefilm Cindy. In the end credits, the back of Walters is seen leaving his office while a female voice off-screen wishes him good night (with the words "Night, Mr. Walters!" or "Merry Christmas, Mr. Walters!" in holiday-themed episodes); Walters merely groans in response while he puts his hat on as he exits. The logo was shot by assistant cinematographer Larry Foster. Ed. Weinberger provided the voice of Walters during the sequence. The woman is Weinberger's actual assistant.

== Filmography ==
- Taxi (1978–1983)
- Cindy (1978)
- The Associates (1979–1980)

== See also ==
- Gracie Films – The succeeding company founded by James L. Brooks
