= How to Marry a Billionaire: A Christmas Tale =

2000 television film directed by Rod Daniel

- DVD cover
- Written by: Steven Peterman; Gary Dontzig
- Directed by: Rod Daniel
- Starring: John Stamos; Joshua Malina; Shemar Moore; Rhea Perlman; Gabrielle Anwar
- Composer: Teddy Castellucci
- Country of origin: United States
- Original language: English

Production
- Executive producers: Ian Sander; Kim Moses
- Producers: Steven Peterman; Gary Dontzig
- Cinematography: Bing Sokolsky
- Editor: Jack Hofstra
- Running time: 100 minutes
- Production companies: Fox Television Studios; Regency Television; Stu Segall Productions

Original release
- Network: Fox
- Release: December 20, 2000

How to Marry a Billionaire: A Christmas Tale is a 2000 American Christmas romantic comedy television film directed by Rod Daniel, starring John Stamos, Joshua Malina, and Shemar Moore. It is a remake of the 1953 film How to Marry a Millionaire and premiered on Fox on December 20, 2000.

== Premise ==
Three friends, disillusioned with their romantic lives, plot to marry millionaires before Christmas Day. In the course, however, they find love each one in his own way.

== Cast ==
- John Stamos as Tom Nathan
- Joshua Malina as Mark Sickler
- Shemar Moore as Jason Hunt
- Gabrielle Anwar as Jenny Seeger
- Dorie Barton as Tiffany Kennedy
- Carole Raphaelle Davis as Catherine
- Rhea Perlman as Jacqueline Kennedy
- Dabney Coleman as John F. Kennedy

== Reception ==
Steven Oxman from Variety magazine wrote: "Despite attractive trappings and some distinctly delightful cameos, Fox's How to Marry a Billionaire ultimately comes off as a wooden effort Fox's take on the original 1953 pic replaces the three women out to marry into money with three men out to accomplish the same—and adds extra zeroes to the titular target. But while the argument presented in the pic—what's good for the goose should be good for the gander (if women can marry for money, why not men?)—makes perfect sense, this story remains an idea that never quite works, resulting in a joyless, if intermittently amusing, made-for."

== See also ==
- List of Christmas films
