= Gracie Films =

American film and television production company

Gracie Films, Inc.
- Logo used since 1987
- Type: Private
- Industry: Film and television animation production
- Predecessor: John Charles Walters Company
- Founded: January 4, 1986; 40 years ago
- Founder: James L. Brooks
- Headquarters: FOX Studios lot, 10201 West Pico Boulevard Bldg 41/42, Los Angeles CA 90064, United States
- Key people: Richard Sakai (president)
- Products: The Simpsons
- Website: graciefilms.com

Gracie Films, Inc. is an American film and television production company founded by James L. Brooks on January 4, 1986. The company is primarily known for producing the animated series The Simpsons. The company's headquarters is located on the Fox Studio Lot at 10201 West Pico Boulevard in Los Angeles.

== History ==
James L. Brooks, who had previously founded John Charles Walters Company, founded Gracie Films at 20th Century Fox on January 4, 1986, with Polly Platt as executive vice president. Named for comedian Gracie Allen, the company was established to "provide real writers with a vehicle to get their movies made". Its primary distributor is currently Sony Pictures Entertainment, though it continues to produce The Simpsons at Fox's studio in Century City, Los Angeles.

According to Simpsons Confidential, Brooks gave The Simpsons' writing staff free rein, as he firmly believed they were the most important part of the process, and "in the legal battles over The Simpsons, it was Fox that was being sued, not Gracie Films". The company also coordinates international distribution and dubbing for The Simpsons, "[finding] voices for dubbing that would match those of the original American actors as closely as possible." Gracie Films’ main production office is at the Sidney Poitier building on the Sony Pictures Studios lot in Culver City, California. In 1989, Gracie Films had struck a deal with ABC.

== Logo ==
Gracie Films' production logo depicts noisy patrons in a movie theatre being shushed by a woman in the back row, while the movie theatre lights dim out and the company logo appears on a projector. This is occasionally changed or parodied in episodes of The Simpsons, particularly in the annual Treehouse of Horror Halloween episodes.

== Filmography ==
=== Television series ===
Years active	Title	Genre	Creator(s)	Co-production company(s)	Network(s)
1987–1990	The Tracey Ullman Show	Sketch comedy	James L. Brooks; Jerry Belson; Ken Estin; Heide Perlman	Klasky Csupo (animation production); 20th Television	Fox
1989–present	The Simpsons	Animated sitcom	Matt Groening	20th Television (1989–2021); 20th Television Animation (2021–present)	Fox
1991–1992	Sibs	Sitcom	Heide Perlman	Columbia Pictures Television	ABC
1993–1994	Phenom	Sitcom	Sam Simon; Dick Blasucci; Marc Flanagan	Columbia Pictures Television; ELP Communications	ABC
1994–1995; 2000–2001 (revival)	The Critic	Animated sitcom	Al Jean; Mike Reiss	Columbia Pictures Television	ABC (1994); Fox (1995); AtomFilms/Shockwave.com (2000-2001)
2001	What About Joan?	Sitcom	Gwen Macsai	Columbia TriStar Television	ABC

==== Television episodes ====
Title	Series	Director	Writer	Original air date	Network	Co-production company
"The Simpsons Guy"	Family Guy	Peter Shin	Patrick Meighan	September 28, 2014	Fox	Fuzzy Door Productions

=== Feature films ===
Year	Title	Director	Writer(s)	Producer(s)	Co-production company(s)	Distributor(s)	Box office	Ref.
1987	Broadcast News	James L. Brooks			20th Century Fox		$67.3 million	
1988	Big	Penny Marshall	Gary Ross; Anne Spielberg	James L. Brooks; Robert Greenhut	20th Century Fox		$151.7 million	
1989	Say Anything...	Cameron Crowe		Polly Platt	20th Century Fox		$20.7 million	
1989	The War of the Roses	Danny DeVito	Michael J. Leeson	James L. Brooks; Arnon Milchan	20th Century Fox		$160.2 million	
1994	I'll Do Anything	James L. Brooks		James L. Brooks; Polly Platt	Columbia Pictures	Sony Pictures Releasing	$10 million	
1996	Bottle Rocket	Wes Anderson	Owen Wilson; Wes Anderson	Polly Platt; Cynthia Hargrave	Columbia Pictures	Sony Pictures Releasing	$560,069	
1996	Jerry Maguire	Cameron Crowe		James L. Brooks; Richard Sakai; Laurence Mark; Cameron Crowe	TriStar Pictures; Vinyl Films	Sony Pictures Releasing	$273.6 million	
1997	As Good as It Gets	James L. Brooks	Story by: Mark Andrus Screenplay by: Mark Andrus; James L. Brooks	James L. Brooks; Bridget Johnson; Kristi Zea	TriStar Pictures	Sony Pictures Releasing	$314.1 million	
2001	Riding in Cars with Boys	Penny Marshall	Morgan Upton Ward	James L. Brooks; Laurence Mark; Sara Colleton; Richard Sakai; Julie Ansell	Columbia Pictures	Sony Pictures Releasing	$35.7 million	
2004	Spanglish	James L. Brooks		Julie Ansell; James L. Brooks; Richard Sakai	Columbia Pictures	Sony Pictures Releasing	$55 million	
2007	The Simpsons Movie	David Silverman	James L. Brooks; Matt Groening; Al Jean; Ian Maxtone-Graham; George Meyer; David Mirkin; Mike Reiss; Mike Scully; Matt Selman; John Swartzwelder; Jon Vitti	James L. Brooks; Matt Groening; Al Jean; Mike Scully; Richard Sakai	20th Century Fox Animation	20th Century Fox	$536.4 million	
2010	How Do You Know	James L. Brooks		Julie Ansell; James L. Brooks; Laurence Mark; Paula Weinstein	Columbia Pictures	Sony Pictures Releasing	$48.7 million	
2016	The Edge of Seventeen	Kelly Fremon Craig		James L. Brooks; Richard Sakai; Julie Ansell	H. Brothers; Tang Media Productions; Virgin Produced	STX Entertainment	$19.4 million	
2018	Icebox	Daniel Sawka		Julie Ansell; James L. Brooks; Richard Sakai	Endeavor Content; HBO Films	HBO	—N/a	
2023	Are You There God? It's Me, Margaret.	Kelly Fremon Craig		James L. Brooks; Julie Ansell; Richard Sakai; Kelly Fremon Craig; Judy Blume; Amy Lorraine Brooks; Aldric La'auli Porter	Lionsgate		$21.5 million	
2025	Ella McCay	James L. Brooks		James L. Brooks; Richard Sakai; Julie Ansell; Jennifer Brooks	20th Century Studios		$4.5 million	
2027	The New Simpsons Movie	TBA	TBA	TBA	20th Century Animation	20th Century Studios	TBA	

=== Theme parks ===
Year	Title	Director	Co-production company(s)	Distributor(s)	Notes
2008	The Simpsons Ride	Mike B. Anderson and John Rice	Blur Studio; Film Roman; Reel FX Creative Studios	Universal Creative	Located in Universal Studios Florida and Universal Studios Hollywood.

=== Shorts ===
Year	Title	Director	Co-production company(s)	Distributor(s)	Notes
2012	The Longest Daycare	David Silverman	20th Century Fox Animation; AKOM; Film Roman	20th Century Fox	Shown with Ice Age: Continental Drift.
2020	Playdate with Destiny	David Silverman	20th Century Animation; AKOM	Walt Disney Studios Motion Pictures	Shown with Onward.
2021	The Force Awakens from Its Nap	David Silverman	20th Television	Disney+	Exclusive Disney+ short film.
2021	The Good, the Bart, and the Loki	David Silverman	20th Television Animation; AKOM	Disney+	Exclusive Disney+ short film.
2021	Plusaversary	David Silverman	20th Television Animation; AKOM	Disney+	Exclusive Disney+ short film.
2022	When Billie Met Lisa	David Silverman	20th Television Animation	Disney+	Exclusive Disney+ short film.
2022	Welcome to the Club	David Silverman	20th Television Animation	Disney+	Exclusive Disney+ short film.
2022	The Simpsons Meet the Bocellis in "Feliz Navidad"	David Silverman	20th Television Animation	Disney+	Exclusive Disney+ short film.
2023	Rogue Not Quite One	David Silverman	Walt Disney Pictures (logo only) / 20th Television Animation	Disney+	Exclusive Disney+ short film.
2024	May the 12th Be with You	David Silverman	20th Television Animation	Disney+	Exclusive Disney+ short film.
2024	The Most Wonderful Time of the Year	David Silverman	20th Television Animation	Disney+	Exclusive Disney+ short film.
