= Dorie Barton =

American actor, writer, and director

- Education: California Institute of the Arts
- Occupations: Actor, writer, director
- Years active: 1993–present

Dorie Barton is an American actor, writer, and director. She began her professional acting career working on a television soap opera and went on to appear in various theater, film, and television productions. She made her debut as a writer-director of film in 2016, and also teaches theater at Virginia Commonwealth University.

== Early life ==
Barton was an Army brat, meaning that her family lived in different places during her childhood, including Iowa and Virginia. She graduated from the California Institute of the Arts with a BFA degree in theater.

== Acting career ==
Barton began her acting career on One Life to Live, playing Beth Garvey, a runaway teenage mother, from 1993 to 1994. When the character was written out of the show, the producers of One Life to Live gave her the option for what would happen to her character, and Barton opted for her character to die on-camera.

Her additional television roles include playing Tess Farraday in the sitcom Stark Raving Mad from 1999 to 2000. She also appeared in Angel, Justice League, Nowhere Man, Vanishing Son, and One Life to Live.

Film roles include How to Marry a Billionaire: A Christmas Tale (2000), Do You Wanna Know a Secret? (2001), Down with Love (2003), Just Desserts (2004), and God Bless America (2011).

Barton also provides voice-overs for films, video games and commercial ads.

== Theater ==
Barton's stage appearances include: Sophistry, Lost Studio Theatre, Los Angeles, 1995; Edith Sussman, Die! Mommy! Die!, House of Sussman Company, Coast Playhouse, West Hollywood, CA, 1999; Secretary and Toni Newsome, Pentecost, Theatre of Note, Evidence Room Theatre, Los Angeles, 2002; and Cringe, Hollywood Stories, Evidence Room Theatre, 2002–2003. Barton also appeared as Paulinka in A Bright Room Called Day, and as a member of ensemble for a production of The Skin of Our Teeth. In 2006, she appeared in Kira Obolensky's play Lobster Alice with the Blank Theatre Company at 2nd Stage Theatre in Hollywood.

== Directing career ==
Barton made her debut as writer-director with the feature film Girl Flu., which premiered at the Los Angeles Film Festival in 2016. It was a festival hit, screening at festivals worldwide and winning awards including the Audience Award (New Director category) at the Nashville Film Festival. The Hollywood Reporter wrote, "It's easy to wish Barton’s direction were more ambitious or her screenplay bolder, but there's a sincerity here, a lack of pretension and a generosity of spirit that proves infectious".

She co-directed She Kills Monsters: Virtual Realms.

In 2021, she is writing and directing the upcoming movie Welcome to the Show.

== Teaching career ==
Barton teaches theater at Virginia Commonwealth University, and serves as film director for VCU's Mainstage Productions. She directs the VCUarts Theatre Showcase Films for graduating acting students, providing a debut into the film industry, and also works as a consultant for scripts and film productions.

== Awards ==
- Audience Award in the New Director category at the Nashville Film Festival for Girl Flu (2016)
- Selected as a finalist for the Commercial Diversity Director's Program (2018)

== Filmography ==
- 1993–1994: Love, Lie, Passion (One Life to Live, TV series)
- 1995: Delinquent's Derby
- 1999: Foreign Correspondents
- 1999–2000: Men without Nerves ( Stark Raving Mad, TV series, 20 episodes)
- 2000: How to Marry a Billionaire: A Christmas Tale (TV movie)
- 2001: Sabrina the Teenage Witch ("Hex, Lies & No Videotape")
- 2001: Do You Wanna Know a Secret?
- 2001: The Kidnapping of Chris Burden
- 2002: Baby Bob (TV series, two episodes)
- 2002: My Wife, Her Dad, and I ( In-Laws, TV series, two episodes)
- 2003: Down with Love - To the devil with love! (Down with Love)
- 2003: Martha, Inc.: The Story of Martha Stewart (TV movie)
- 2003: Justice League - Princess Audrey (episode: "Maid of Honor")
- 2003–2004: I'm with Her (TV series, four episodes)
- 2004: Love for Dessert (Just Desserts, TV movie)
- 2004: Meet the Fockers
- 2005: Bewitched
- 2006: What I Did for Love (TV movie)
- 2006: Roasted and Sold (Grilled)
- 2006—2007: Cold Case (TV series, one episode)
- 2008: The Nanny Express (TV movie)
- 2009: All About Steve
- 2009: Otis E.
- 2011: God Bless America
- 2011: The Mentalist - Linda Tibbs
- 2012–2013: Ave 43 (TV series, seven episodes)
