= Just Desserts (film) =

2004 television film directed by Kevin Connor

- Written by: Joseph Tropiano
- Directed by: Kevin Connor
- Starring: Costas Mandylor; Lauren Holly
- Theme music composer: Roger Bellon
- Country of origin: United States
- Original language: English

Production
- Producers: Lincoln Lageson; Randy Pope
- Cinematography: Maximo Munzi
- Editor: Colleen Halsey
- Running time: 85 minutes

Original release
- Network: Hallmark Channel
- Release: February 8, 2004

Just Desserts is a 2004 American made-for-television romantic comedy film reuniting Costas Mandylor and Lauren Holly, who had previously worked together on the television series Picket Fences. It premiered on Hallmark Channel on February 8, 2004.

== Plot ==
Passionate Italian baker Marco Poloni (Costas Mandylor) enters a baking competition entitled "The Golden Whisk" to attract publicity and win prize money to support his struggling family-owned bakery in the Bronx. He asks for the help of uptight Manhattan-based pastry-maker Grace Carpenter (Lauren Holly). The unlikely pair must win to pursue their dreams and to show up an old rival of Poloni's who has also entered the competition. Along the way Marco and Grace seem to find a mutual attraction for each other.

== Cast ==
- Costas Mandylor as Marco Poloni
- Lauren Holly as Grace Carpenter
- Dorie Barton as Candy Fallon
- Andrew Lauer as Jacques du Jacques
- Brenda Vaccaro as Lina
- Wolfgang Puck as Himself
