= Joe Regalbuto =

American actor and director (born 1949)

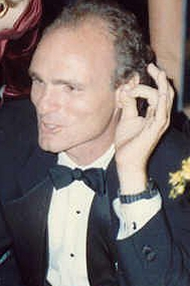
- Regalbuto at the 1989 Primetime Emmy Awards
- Born: August 24, 1949 (age 77); Brooklyn, New York, U.S.
- Education: New York University (MFA)
- Occupations: Actor, director
- Years active: 1977–present
- Spouse: Rosemary Regalbuto (m. 1972)
- Children: 3

Joe Regalbuto (born August 24, 1949) is an American actor and director. He is known for his role as Frank Fontana on the CBS television sitcom Murphy Brown, which earned him a Primetime Emmy Award nomination in 1989.

== Early life ==
Regalbuto, who is of Italian heritage, was born in Brooklyn and graduated from New Milford High School in New Milford, New Jersey, in 1967. In 1969, he was drafted for military service, but successfully applied for conscientious objector status, and served alternate service New York University Medical Center.

== Career ==
After some bits and guest appearances, he had his first major role as attorney Elliot Streeter in the acclaimed but short-lived legal sitcom The Associates, which aired from 1979-80.

In 1982, Joe Regalbuto played a supporting role in the critically acclaimed film Missing, as well as the role of Darius in the cult sci-fi/fantasy movie The Sword and the Sorcerer, and, on television, the recurring role of Kalnik the evil alien in three episodes of Mork & Mindy.

In 1983, he appeared in the comedy series Ace Crawford, Private Eye alongside Tim Conway. He starred as Ace Crawford's accountant Toomey.

He starred in the CBS series Knots Landing in the 1984–1985 and 1985–1986 seasons as Harry Fisher, a man who takes possession of the Ewing twins illegally, which centered on the Black Market storyline.

In 1984, he appeared in the TV movie Invitation to Hell, directed by Wes Craven.

In 1985, Regalbuto increased his household recognition when he guest starred as cab driver and high school friend, Don Eddie Rice, in the television series Magnum, P.I. episode "Going Home". A year earlier, he co-starred with Magnum, P.I. star Tom Selleck in Selleck's 2nd film, Lassiter.

In 1986, Regalbuto starred in the TV movie Fuzz Bucket and a short-lived series, Street Hawk, and co-starred in the short-lived 1979 sitcom The Associates with Martin Short.

In 1988, he played the part of Rebecca Devereaux's verbally abusive boyfriend, Jeremy, in the TV series The Golden Girls.

Joe starred in Murphy Brown for the entire first run of the acclaimed series from November 14, 1988, to May 18, 1998.

He appeared on an uncredited role in the 1992 movie The Babe.

Late in the series, Regalbuto directed more than 20 episodes of Murphy Brown. He also has directed episodes of Friends, Titus, George Lopez, Wizards of Waverly Place, Hot in Cleveland and other television programs. Regalbuto also was an early spokesman for DirecTV when it first came out.

In 2002, he appeared on the final season (5th) of the Ally McBeal TV series, episode 10, "One Hundred Tears", as Harvey Hall, a man who believed he could fly, using wings of his own making.

In 2008, he had a small role in the movie Bottle Shock. In 2008, he also had guest roles in the TV series Ghost Whisperer and Criminal Minds. In 2009, Regalbuto had a guest appearance on NCIS.

In 2012, he played the critically acclaimed part of Mr Rogers in the TV Series Southland: "his character feigned grief in what Det. Lydia Adams (Regina King) called 'an Academy Award-winning performance.' He's not eligible for an Oscar, but Regalbuto might just get an Emmy".

In 2015, he had a guest role as Stuart "Stu" Sloan in episode 4, "Turn Down", of season 4 in the TV series Major Crimes.

Regalbuto returned to a revival series of Murphy Brown in 2018 along with former co-stars Candice Bergen, Faith Ford and Grant Shaud.

In 2026 he played Doctor Carlton in Episode 7 ("Lawrence") of Life, Larry and the Pursuit of Unhappiness.

== Personal life ==
Regalbuto is married to RoseMary Regalbuto, a former president of Meals On Wheels West in Santa Monica, California, and Santa Monica Travel and Tourism, Inc. board member from 2014 to 2022, and board member for eight years on the Commission on Older Americans (Commission for the Senior Community). They have three children.
