= Father and Son =

Father and Son or Fathers and Sons may refer to:

== Literature ==
- Father and Son (Gosse book), a 1907 memoir by Edmund Gosse
- Father and Son (comics), cartoon characters created by E. O. Plauen
- Fathers and Sons (novel), an 1862 novel by Ivan Turgenev
- Fathers and Sons (play), a 1987 play by Brian Friel
- "Fathers and Sons" (short story), a 1933 short story by Ernest Hemingway
- Father and Son (Brown novel), a 1996 novel by American writer Larry Brown
- Father and Son (Raban book), a 2023 memoir by Jonathan Raban

== Music ==
- "Father and Son" (song), a 1970 song by Cat Stevens
- Fathers and Sons (album), a 1969 album by Muddy Waters
- Fathers & Sons (Luke Combs album), a 2024 album by Luke Combs
- "Father and Son", a song by Gino Vannelli from the 1975 album Storm at Sunup
- "Father and Son", a song by Jay Chou from the 2007 album Secret
- "Father and Son", a 1996 song from Aladdin and the King of Thieves
- "Father and Son", a 2018 song from Live in London (Flight of the Conchords album)
- "Father and Son", a 2026 song from Inferno

== Film ==
- Father and Son (1929 American film), an American film
- Father and Son (1929 German film), a German silent film
- Father and Son (1930 film), a German-Swedish film
- Father and Son (1934 film), a British crime film
- Father and Son (1981 film), Hong Kong film
- Fathers & Sons (1992 film), an American film
- Fathers & Sons (2010 film), a Canadian comedy-drama film
- Fathers and Sons (1957 film), an Italian comedy film
- Fathers and Sons (1958 film), a Soviet drama film
- Father and Son (1994 film), an Italian film
- Father and Son (2003 film), a Russian film
- Father and Son (2017 Vietnamese film), a film by Lương Đình Dũng
- Father and Son (2017 Chinese film), a film by Yuan Weidong

== Television ==
- Father & Son (TV serial), a British/Irish television serial
- Fathers and Sons (1986 TV series), an American sitcom
- Fathers and Sons (2007 TV series), a Hong Kong television drama
- "Fathers and Sons" (Frasier), an episode of Frasier
- "Fathers and Sons" (Justified), an episode of Justified
- Fathers and Sons (The Outer Limits), an episode of The Outer Limits
- Fathers and Sons (2005 film), an American television movie starring Reiko Aylesworth

== Other uses ==
- Father and Son (Bourgeois), a 2005 fountain and sculpture by Louise Bourgeois

== See also ==
- "Fathers and Suns", an episode of Red Dwarf
- Like Father Like Son (disambiguation)
- Of Fathers and Sons, a 2017 documentary film
- Vader & Zoon, a comic strip by Peter van Straaten
