= Shelley Smith (actress) =

American actress and model (1952–2023)

- Smith in The Associates (1979)
- Born: October 25, 1952; Princeton, New Jersey, U.S.
- Died: August 8, 2023 (aged 70); Los Angeles, California, U.S.
- Education: Antioch University
- Occupation: Actress
- Years active: 1979–1991
- Spouse(s): Reid Nathan (m. 19??; div. ??) Michael Maguire (m. 2005)
- Children: 3

Shelley Smith (October 25, 1952 – August 8, 2023) was an American fashion model and actress who later became a marriage-and-fertility specialist.

Smith was born in Princeton, New Jersey and graduated from Connecticut College. She first came to prominence as a fashion model, appearing in such magazines as Vogue, Harper’s Bazaar, Glamour and Mademoiselle. She then became an actress, primarily on television, working throughout the 1980s. She was in the main casts of two short-lived series, The Associates (9 episodes aired) and For Love and Honor (13 episodes), but mostly made guest appearances on episodes of series such as Murder, She Wrote; The Love Boat; and celebrity game shows in the 1980s, including Super Password, Pyramid, and Body Language.

Smith retired from acting and obtained a master's degree in psychology from Antioch University.

In 1989, she and her then husband, Reid Nathan, had a son together, Justin, who died three days after his birth. In 1991, she founded the Egg Donor Program, now known as Hatch Fertility, to help infertile couples. Using donor eggs, Smith and Nathan attempted births through surrogacy, resulting in the 1995 birth of twins, son Nicholas and daughter Miranda. After her divorce from Nathan, Smith married actor Michael Maguire.

== Death ==
Smith suffered a cardiac arrest on August 5, 2023. She died in Los Angeles on August 8, at the age of 70.

== Filmography ==
=== Film ===
Year	Title	Role	Notes
1982	Class Reunion a/ka National Lampoon's Class Reunion	Meredith Modess	Feature film
1990	Fatal Charm	Kathy Crowley	Direct-to-video film

=== Television ===
Year	Title	Role	Notes
1979	Mirror, Mirror	Nola McGuire	TV movie
1979-1980	The Associates	Sara James	Series regular (13 episodes; 4 unaired)
1980	Swan Song	Sheila	TV movie
1980	Tenspeed and Brown Shoe	Phyllis Lassiter	Episode: "Savage Says, 'The Most Dangerous Bird Is the Jailbird"
1980	The Stockard Channing Show	Holly Sheperd	Episode: "Exclusive: Love Finds Brad Gabriel"
1980	Angie	Dr. Walker	Episode: "Angie and the Doctor"
1980	The Love Boat	Gwen Hutchins	Episode: "Sergeant Bull/Friends and Lovers/Miss Mother"
1980	Hart to Hart	Marina Belson	Episode: "Downhill to Death"
1980	The Night the City Screamed	Dr. Agretti	TV movie
1981	This House Possessed	Tanya	TV movie
1981	The Phoenix	Noel Marshall	Episode: "The Phoenix" (this pilot aired in 1981 as a TV movie but is considered as the first episode of the series which premiered one year later)
1981	Scruples	Billy Ikehorn	TV movie (unsold pilot based on the highly successful 3-part 1980 miniseries)
1981	Fantasy Island	Pamela Archer	Episode: "Loving Strangers/Something Borrowed, Something Blue"
1982	Fantasy Island	Miss Harbinger	Episode: "A Very Strange Affair/The Sailor"
1983	Hart to Hart	Susy Jensen	Episode: "Pounding Harts"
1983	Tales of the Gold Monkey	Sabrina Doppler	Episode: "High Stakes Lady"
1983	Simon & Simon	Eleanor Swayze / Eleanor 'Ellie' Swanson	Episode: "The Secret of the Chrome Eagle"
1983-1984	For Love and Honor	Captain Carolyn Engel	Series regular (13 episodes)
1984	Fantasy Island	Lynn	Episode: "Lady of the House/Mrs. Brandell's Favorites"
1984	The Fantastic World of D. C. Collins	Ann Harris	TV movie
1984	Hotel	Dorothy Mintzer	Episode: "Vantage Point"
1984	Cover Up	Kristi Collins	Episode: "The Million Dollar Face"
1986	Lady Blue	Tish Stahlman	Episode: "Scorpio's Sting"
1986	Simon & Simon	Adrianna	Episode: "Full Moon Blues"
1986	Simon & Simon	Elaine Bishop	Episode: "Treasure"
1986	The Love Boat	Phyllis Townsend	Episode: "Picture Me a Spy/Daredevil/Sleeper"
1986	Magnum, P.I.	Peggy Armbruster	Episode: "All Thieves on Deck"
1986	Diff'rent Strokes	Summer Hartwig	Episode: "Lifestyles of the Poor and Unknown"
1986	Mike Hammer	Katie Wilkins	Episode: "Golden Lady"
1987	Hunter	Stella Graham	Episode: "Down and Under"
1987	Webster	Georgette Walters	Episode: "The Talk Show"
1987	Murder, She Wrote	Alison Hampton	Episode: "When Thieves Fall Out"
1988	Simon & Simon	Katherine Buckman	Episode: "Something Special"
1988	Magnum, P.I.	Melissa Wainwright	Episode: "A Girl Named Sue"
1989	Dragnet	Marsha	Episode: "Automated Muggings"
1991	Murder, She Wrote	Katherine McSorley	Episode: "A Killing in Vegas"
