= Shelley Herman =

American television writer

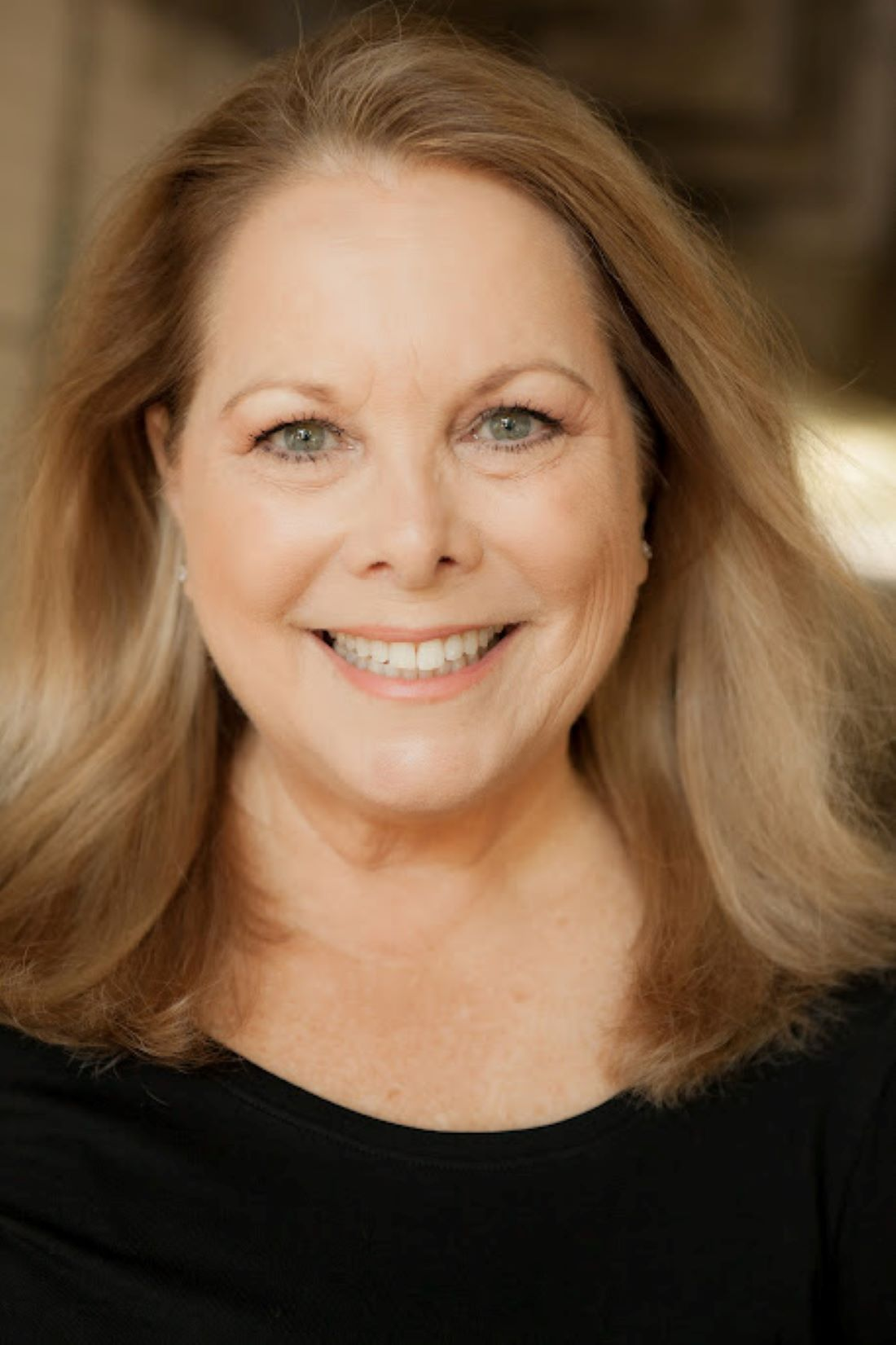
- Born: February 7, 1955 (age 71); Philadelphia
- Education: Agoura High School; California State University, Northridge
- Occupation: Television writer
- Spouse: Randall Carver (m. 2012)

Shelley Herman (born February 7, 1955, in Philadelphia) is an American television writer, best known for her work on the game shows Supermarket Sweep, Liar's Club, Love Connection, Breakaway, Outdoor Outtakes, Trivia Unwrapped, Balderdash, Show Me the Money, and The Million Second Quiz. For her work on Breakaway, she was nominated for a Daytime Emmy Award for Outstanding Special Class Writing in 1985. She was twice a contestant on The Dating Game.

Herman's autobiographical memoir, My Peacock Tale: Secrets Of An NBC Page (2023), detailed her time working as a page for NBC in Burbank, California in the 1970s, where she worked on several variety shows, talk shows, and game shows such as The Tonight Show, The Gong Show, The Midnight Special, Hollywood Squares, Password, Sanford and Son, and Chico and the Man. A graduate of Agoura High School and California State University, Northridge, Herman is married to Randall Carver.

== Works ==
- My Peacock Tale: Secrets Of An NBC Page. BearManor Media. 2 May 2023. ISBN 979-8-88771-138-6. OCLC 1396790545.
