= Do You Wanna Know a Secret? =

2001 American slasher film

- Directed by: Thomas S. Bradford
- Produced by: Kermit Christman; Edward Lopatin
- Starring: Dorie Barton; Joey Lawrence; Chad Allen; Jeff Conaway
- Edited by: Russell Harnden III
- Music by: Jeff Eden Fair; Starr Parodi
- Release date: April 23, 2001 (Palm Beach Film Festival)
- Running time: 94 min.
- Country: United States
- Language: English

Do You Wanna Know A Secret? is a 2001 American slasher film directed by Thomas S. Bradford. The film stars Dorie Barton, Joey Lawrence and Chad Allen. The plot follows six friends on a retreat, where they are stalked by a killer in a black cloak and rubber mask. It was released on April 23, 2001 at Palm Beach Film Festival.

== Plot ==
A male college student receives a note under his dorm door that says "do you wanna know a secret?". He assumes it is from his girlfriend Beth (Dorie Barton). He goes into the hallway to find her and is killed by someone in a mask.

One year later Beth, her new boyfriend Hank (Joey Lawrence), and her friends Oz (Thomas Anthony Jones), Tina (Leonora Scelfo), Nellie (Elsie Escobar) and Brad (Chad Allen) go on their spring break vacation in Florida. On the first night, Brad tries to hit on Beth, but she tells him that they are just friends.

Brad is attacked on a sailboat while the others are in the house. His bloody shirt is found in the water, though his body is missing. The group sees a message on his computer: "do you wanna know a secret?".

The following night, a drunken Tina kisses Hank. Beth refuses to talk to him until the next night when he saves her from getting roofied at a nightclub. Beth goes outside the club for air, where she witnesses the boy who tried to drug her being murdered by someone in a mask. When the police arrive, they find "do you wanna know a secret?" is carved in the boy's back. An FBI agent (Jeff Conaway) tells the group not to leave the house, as they are all suspects for both murders.

The next day, Oz is attacked in the kitchen while Beth and Hank are showering. Outside at the pool, Tina's throat has been slit while Nellie swims. When she finishes she is attacked from behind, has her throat slit as well and is thrown in the pool. Oz regains consciousness, and sees the same message written on the wall in blood. He runs outside to find both Nellie and Tina dead. Oz is arrested by the police for the murders.

At the precinct, the officer who arrested Oz is in the bathroom when he sees the message on the wall. He is then murdered by the masked figure. Oz is released. Beth is waiting outside the police station when she sees a truck drive by. The driver is wearing the mask she remembers from the murder at the club. Hank is nowhere to be found, so she follows the truck out to the glades and waits for Oz to meet up with her.

Oz and Beth search for the killer in the dark woods. They are separated and Oz is knocked out from behind. He wakes up in the basement of a church and hears Beth's scream. Upstairs in the church Beth is tied up in a wedding dress and blindfolded. The killer removes Beth's blindfold and his mask, revealing himself as Brad. Beth sees that the dead bodies of Tina, Nellie, and the pastor are set up in the pews, as if watching. Brad starts cutting Beth's dress open with a knife, when Oz shows up. Brad and Oz fight but Brad wins and ties Oz up again. Beth asks Brad why he murdered everyone. Brad explains that the secret is he loves Beth so much he would do anything, including staging his own death and killing all the others. He then holds up Hank's severed head.

Beth secretly unties her hands and attacks Brad. He knocks her to the ground but Oz gets untied and attacks Brad. As Brad is about to kill Oz, Beth stabs him through his entire body. As Oz and Beth exit the church, Brad jumps up again and is shot by the FBI agent. The agent reveals that the dead pastor was Brad's father.

== Cast ==
- Dorie Barton
- Joey Lawrence
- Chad Allen
- Jeff Conaway

== Reception ==
Jeremy Wheeler of the online film database Allmovie awarded the film one star out of five, noting that the cast's "acting about as good as the Price Is Right showgirls, at the very least the flick could fall back on is its scares and bloody gore... Unfortunately there isn't any. Yes, yet another modern slasher that doesn't deliver on the goods — the only reason the people are watching this junk in the first place (besides the actor's relatives)".
