= Like Mother Like Daughter =

Like Mother Like Daughter may refer to:

- Like Mother, Like Daughter, a gift book of the comic strip Cathy
- Like Mother, Like Daughter (But in a Good Way), an omnibus book featuring novellas by Jennifer Greene and Peggy Webb
- McCloud: Like Mother, Like Daughter, a novel series by Marie Ferrarella
- Like Mother, Like Daughter, psychological thriller webtoon written and illustrated by YIDAHM

== Television ==
- "Like Mother, Like Daughter" (Gilmore Girls), an episode of Gilmore Girls
- "Like Mother, Like Daughter", an episode of the reality series Dallas Divas & Daughters
- "Like Mother, Like Daughter", an episode of the reality series Living Lohan
- "Like Mother, Like Daughter", an episode of the situation comedy series Maude
- "Like Mother, Like Daughter", an episode of the situation comedy series The Facts of Life
- "Like Mother, Like Daughter", an episode of the situation comedy series Happy Days
- "Like Mother, Like Daughter, Like Wow", an episode of the situation comedy series The Many Loves of Dobie Gillis
- "Like Mother, Like Daughter, Like Supermodel", an episode of the teenager drama series Make It or Break It

== See also ==
- Like Father Like Son (disambiguation)
- Like Father Like Daughter (disambiguation)
