= Taxi (TV series) =

American television sitcom (1978–1983)

- Genre: Sitcom
- Created by: James L. Brooks; Stan Daniels; David Davis; Ed. Weinberger
- Directed by: James Burrows (seasons 1–4); Various (seasons 2–5)
- Starring: Judd Hirsch; Jeff Conaway; Danny DeVito; Marilu Henner; Tony Danza; Randall Carver; Andy Kaufman; Christopher Lloyd; Carol Kane
- Theme music composer: Bob James
- Opening theme: "Angela"
- Country of origin: United States
- Original language: English
- No. of seasons: 5
- No. of episodes: 114 (list of episodes)

Production
- Executive producers: James L. Brooks; Stan Daniels; Ed. Weinberger; David Davis
- Producers: Richard Sakai; Howard Gewirtz; Ian Praiser
- Production locations: Stage 23, Paramount Studios, Hollywood, California
- Camera setup: Multiple-camera
- Running time: 24 minutes
- Production companies: John Charles Walters Productions; Paramount Television

Original release
- Network: ABC
- Release: September 12, 1978 – May 6, 1982
- Network: NBC
- Release: September 30, 1982 – June 15, 1983

Taxi is an American television sitcom that originally aired on ABC from September 12, 1978, to May 6, 1982, and on NBC from September 30, 1982, to June 15, 1983. It focuses on the everyday lives of a handful of New York City taxi drivers and their abusive dispatcher. For most of the run of the show, the ensemble cast consisted of taxi drivers Alex Reiger (Judd Hirsch), Bobby Wheeler (Jeff Conaway), Elaine Nardo (Marilu Henner), Tony Banta (Tony Danza), and "Reverend" Jim Ignatowski (Christopher Lloyd), along with dispatcher Louie De Palma (Danny DeVito) and mechanic Latka Gravas (Andy Kaufman). Taxi was produced by the John Charles Walters Company, in association with Paramount Network Television, and was created by James L. Brooks, Stan Daniels, David Davis, and Ed. Weinberger, all of whom were brought on board after working on The Mary Tyler Moore Show (which ended in 1977).

The show was a critical and commercial success and is widely regarded as one of the greatest television shows of all time. It was nominated for 34 Primetime Emmy Awards and won 18, including wins in three consecutive years for Outstanding Comedy Series. It has remained in syndicated reruns ever since the series ended.

== Premise and themes ==
The show focuses on the employees who work the night shift at the fictional Sunshine Cab Company, and its principal setting is the company's fleet garage in Manhattan. Among the drivers, only Alex Reiger, who is disillusioned with life, considers cab driving his profession. The others view it as a temporary or part-time occupation.

Elaine Nardo is a single mother working as a receptionist at an art gallery. Tony Banta is a boxer with a losing record. Bobby Wheeler is a struggling actor. John Burns (written out of the show after the first season) is working his way through college. All take pity on "Reverend Jim" Ignatowski, an aging hippie minister who is burnt out from drugs, so they help him become a cabbie. The characters also include Latka Gravas, their innocent, wide-eyed mechanic from an unnamed foreign country, and Louie De Palma, the despotic dispatcher.

A number of episodes involve a character having an opportunity to realize their dream to move up in the world, only to see it yanked away. Otherwise, the cabbies deal on a daily basis with their unsatisfying lives and with Louie's abusive behavior and contempt (despite being a former cab driver himself). Louie's assistant, Jeff Bennett, is rarely heard from at first, but his role increased in later seasons.

Despite the humor of the show, Taxi often tackles such dramatic life issues as presenteeism, victimization, adultery, pre-marital pregnancy, drug addiction, single parenthood, blindness, obesity, dissociative identity disorder, animal abuse, homosexuality, racism, teenage runaways, divorce, nuclear war, sexual harassment, premenstrual mood disorders, gambling addiction, and grief.

== Cast and characters ==
=== Main ===
Character	Actor	Seasons				
Character	Actor	1	2	3	4	5
Alex Reiger	Judd Hirsch	Main	Main	Main	Main	Main
Bobby Wheeler	Jeff Conaway	Main	Main	Main	Recurring (Note: Conaway is credited alongside the main cast for two episodes, which were held over from season 3, and makes one further appearance credited as a special guest star.)	
Louie De Palma	Danny DeVito	Main	Main	Main	Main	Main
Elaine O'Connor Nardo	Marilu Henner	Main	Main	Main	Main	Main
Anthony Mark "Tony" Banta	Tony Danza	Main	Main	Main	Main	Main
Latka Gravas	Andy Kaufman	Main	Main	Main	Main	Main
John Burns	Randall Carver	Main				
Reverend Jim "Iggy" Ignatowski	Christopher Lloyd	Guest	Main	Main	Main	Main
Simka Gravas	Carol Kane		Guest		Recurring	Main

Cast of the debut season (ABC, 1978–79). From left to right: (back) Marilu Henner, Judd Hirsch; (front) Andy Kaufman, Jeff Conaway, Randall Carver, Danny DeVito, Tony Danza

Cast of the final season (NBC, 1982–83). From left to right: (back) Kaufman, Carol Kane, DeVito, Hirsch; (front) Danza, Henner, Christopher Lloyd

- Alex Reiger (Judd Hirsch) – Alex is the main protagonist in the sitcom, the compassionate, level-headed core of the show; the one everyone else turns to for advice. At one point, he reveals his anxiety with this unwanted burden. He once worked in an office, with a good chance of advancement, but lost this job owing to his refusal to follow the company line. He was married to Phyllis Bornstein (Louise Lasser), and when she divorced him because of his lack of ambition she sought sole custody of their baby daughter, Cathy (Talia Balsam). He gave in rather than fight it. He is estranged from his lothario father, Joe (Jack Gilford), but has a closer relationship with his sister, Charlotte (Joan Hackett). Alex is a recovered compulsive gambler, although he relapses in one episode. A deadpan cynic, he has resigned himself to driving a cab for the rest of his life.
- Robert L. "Bobby" Wheeler (Jeff Conaway) (1978–1981, recurring 1981–1982) – Bobby is a vain, struggling actor who is Louie's favorite target for scorn and abuse. Robin Williams was considered for the role, but he was already committed to Mork & Mindy. Success as an actor eludes Bobby. He is signed by a famous manager, but it turns out she only wants him as a lover, not a client. Later he is cast in the pilot for a soap opera, but his part is recast when the series goes into production. Conaway left the show at the beginning of season 4, returning for a guest appearance in which his character leaves the taxi company for good. Writer Sam Simon explained later that when Conaway was absent for an episode, his dialogue was successfully reassigned to other cast members, which made the producers realize that he was expendable.
- Louie De Palma (Danny DeVito) – Louie is the main antagonist of the sitcom. The head dispatcher of the Sunshine Cab Company and supervisor to the cab drivers, Louie spends his time holding court inside the caged-in dispatch office at the garage, arguing with, belittling and bullying the drivers. He not only lacks morals, he is openly proud of his misdemeanors and outright crimes. Louie will do anything to benefit himself, from taking advantage of a drunken friend of his on-again, off-again girlfriend Zena Sherman (played by DeVito's real-life wife Rhea Perlman), to gambling with a young boy, to stealing from the company, to spying on Elaine while she is changing. He lives with his mother (DeVito's real mother, Julia, in two episodes). On some occasions he helps his workers, as in the episode in which a cruel hairstylist (played by Ted Danson) gives Elaine a garish makeover just before a very important event, it is Louie who bolsters her confidence to confront him. Louie is very superstitious, in one episode exhibiting great concern when Jim has a premonition that Alex is going to die later that night. In 1999, TV Guide ranked De Palma first on its list of the 50 greatest TV characters of all time. DeVito told AARP: The Magazine he won the role after asking the creators in his audition “Who wrote this shit?” then throwing the script on the table. “They fell on the floor,” recalled DeVito. “Louie walked into their lives.”
- Elaine O'Connor Nardo (Marilu Henner) – Elaine is a divorced mother of two, struggling to cope while trying to realize her ambitions in the field of fine art. Elaine works as a part time cab driver as a moonlighting job while she works as a receptionist in an art gallery. Also Louie's object of lust, she is attracted to characters played by actors ranging from Tom Selleck to Wallace Shawn. The last name for the character was taken from Patricia Nardo, a scriptwriter, former secretary, and close friend of Taxi co-creator James L. Brooks.
- Anthony Mark "Tony" Banta (Tony Danza) – The kind-hearted, slow-witted Vietnam veteran and boxer has little success in the sport (in one episode Banta gives his record as 8 wins, 24 losses and he has been knocked out 14 times). In fact, Louie makes a lot of money betting against him (when Banta makes a conscious decision to throw a fight, Louie decides to bet on Banta because the only way Banta can remain a loser in such a situation is to win). Finally, the boxing commission takes away his license because he has been knocked out one too many times.Tony got his boxing license reinstated. In the final season, Tony is introduced to new girlfriend Vicki (Anne De Salvo) by Simka. He and Vicki have a falling out after she becomes pregnant by him, but reconcile and get married. The last name for the character was taken from Gloria Banta, a scriptwriter and close friend of Taxi co-creator James L. Brooks.
- Reverend Jim Ignatowski (Christopher Lloyd) (guest star 1978, main cast 1979–1983) – A washed-up figure of the 1960s, Jim lives in a world of his own. He was once a diligent, mature student at Harvard University, with an extremely wealthy father (Victor Buono), but one bite of a drug-laden brownie was enough to get him hooked and send him into a downward spiral. His real last name had been Caldwell; he changed it to Ignatowski, thinking that the backward pronunciation of that name was "Star Child". In a particularly memorable episode, “Reverend Jim: A Space Odyssey”, the cabbies help him pass a written exam to become one of them. He occasionally exhibits unexpected talents, such as the ability to play the piano masterfully (much to his own surprise). TV Guide placed Ignatowski 32nd on its list of the 50 greatest TV characters.
- Latka Gravas (Andy Kaufman) – Latka is an immigrant from a strange foreign land, often speaking in his foreign tongue (actually gibberish, often with invented phrases such as "ibi da" or "nik nik"), but when speaking English he speaks with a very heavy accent. He works as a mechanic, fixing the taxis. Latka was an adaptation of Kaufman's "Foreign Man" character, which he originated in his stage act. In this act, "Foreign Man" claimed to be from the fictional island of Caspiar in the Caspian Sea. Kaufman, feeling that he had lost creative control over the character he had created, eventually grew tired of the gag, leading the writers to give Latka multiple personality disorder. This allowed Kaufman to play other characters, the most frequent being a repellent, smooth-talking lounge-lizard persona calling himself Vic Ferrari. In one episode, Latka becomes Alex, with profound insights into "his" life. Just as he is about to reveal to the real Alex the perfect solution for all his problems, he reverts to Latka.
- Simka Dahblitz-Gravas (Carol Kane) (recurring 1980–1982, starring 1982–1983) – She is from the same country as Latka. They belong to different ethnic groups which traditionally detest each other, but they fall in love and eventually marry. She is much more assertive than her husband, often standing up to Louie on his behalf.
- John Burns (Randall Carver) (1978–1979) – The naive young man works as a cabbie to pay for college, where he is working towards a degree in forestry. According to Carver, "the characters of John Burns and Tony Banta were too similar... some of the lines were almost interchangeable", so he was dropped after the first season without explanation. The premiere episode, "Like Father, Like Daughter", established that John started working for the cab company after he was a passenger in Alex's cab. John did not have change, so he had to ride with Alex to the garage to pay him. Once there, he started hanging around and eventually applied for a job. In the episode "The Great Line", he spontaneously marries a complete stranger named Suzanne.

=== Recurring ===
- Jeff Bennett (J. Alan Thomas), Sunshine Cab's assistant dispatcher, he shares the "cage" with Louie but rarely speaks or interacts with the other characters. A quiet African-American man with an afro, Jeff appears throughout the show's run, initially as a bit part player and/or background performer. As the series progressed, Jeff gradually became more of a featured supporting player; his evolution culminated in a storyline in the season 5 episode "Crime and Punishment", in which Louie falsely accuses Jeff of stealing car parts from the company and selling them on the black market—a crime which Louie himself committed. Thomas appeared as himself in the 1999 film Man on the Moon.
- Tommy Jeffries (T.J. Castronova), the bartender and waiter at Mario's, the restaurant where the group often hangs out. Tommy is pretty friendly with the whole gang, taking an interest in their personal lives.
- Joe Reiger (Jack Gilford) (1979–1981), Alex's father, from whom he is estranged. In his first appearance, he suffers a heart attack and Alex is convinced by his sister Charlotte (Joan Hackett) to visit him in the hospital. Alex and Joe had not spoken in 30 years, and Alex mistakes another patient for Joe.
- Zena Sherman (Rhea Perlman) (1979–1982). She has a romantic relationship with Louie (played by Perlman's real-life husband DeVito), but marries someone else after they break up.
- Greta Gravas (Susan Kellermann) (1979–1982), Latka's mother. She has a short fling with Alex, which causes friction with Latka.
- Phyllis Bornstein-Consuelos (Louise Lasser) (1980–1982), Alex's ex-wife, with whom he had a daughter. Phyllis became fed up with his lack of ambition and remarried, but they remain strongly attracted to each other. She once goes out on a date with Louie, just to irritate Alex.
- Cathy (Talia Balsam) (1978–1980), Phyllis and Alex's daughter. In the first episode of the series, Alex finds out that Cathy, who was a baby when he and Phyllis divorced, is making a stopover in Miami on her way to attend college in Portugal. He drives to Miami to meet her for the first time since then. In a later episode, he attends Cathy's wedding.
- Brian Sims (Marc Anthony Danza). In his first appearance, Tony fights a former boxing champ whose best days are behind him. He becomes troubled when he realizes that the champ is dedicating the fight to wheelchair user Brian (played by Danza's real-life son). In a next-season episode, Tony seeks to adopt him.

=== Guests ===
Among the many guest stars, Ruth Gordon won an Emmy Award for her guest portrayal of Dee Wilcox in "Sugar Mama" (1979), and Eileen Brennan was nominated for an Emmy for her guest portrayal of Mrs. McKenzie in "Thy Boss's Wife" (1981).

In the episode titled "Louie's Rival," Rhea Perlman guest starred as Zena Sherman.

Guests who played themselves include actresses Marcia Wallace and Penny Marshall, psychologist Dr. Joyce Brothers, cookie entrepreneur Wally "Famous" Amos, newscasters Edwin Newman and Eric Sevareid (the latter in a fantasy sequence), and ring announcer Jimmy Lennon. WBC world welterweight boxing champion Carlos Palomino appeared in the first-season episode "One-Punch Banta" as himself. Palomino accidentally punched Danza in the face during a brief fight scene. Martial artist and professional wrestler Gene LeBell played himself in multiple episodes as the referee for Banta's boxing matches.

George Wendt and Ted Danson, who appeared in separate episodes, went on to star in primary Taxi director Jim Burrows' next series, Cheers, as did recurring Taxi performer Rhea Perlman. Tom Selleck and Mandy Patinkin had memorable guest appearances, each as one of the memorable fares of Cab 804 (in "Memories of Cab 804: Part 2"), while Tom Hanks portrayed Reverend Jim's college roommate in the flashback episode "The Road Not Taken, Part 1". Allan Arbus, who portrayed US Army psychiatrist Dr. Sidney Freedman in M*A*S*H, played his manager in the episode. Football player-turned-actor Bubba Smith appeared in one episode. In the episode "Jim Joins the Network", Martin Short played a failing TV network executive who takes advantage of Jim's exceptional ability to schedule shows for his own career advancement.

== Episodes ==
Season	Episodes	Originally released		
Season	Episodes	First released	Last released	Network
1	22	September 12, 1978	May 15, 1979	ABC
2	24	September 11, 1979	May 13, 1980	ABC
3	20	November 19, 1980	May 21, 1981	ABC
4	24	October 18, 1981	May 6, 1982	ABC
5	24	September 30, 1982	June 15, 1983	NBC

== Awards and nominations ==
Taxi is one of television's most lauded shows. During its run, the sitcom was nominated for 34 Emmy Awards and won 18, including three for Outstanding Comedy Series. It was also nominated for 26 Golden Globes, with four wins (three for Best TV Series – Musical/Comedy). In 1979, it received the Humanitas Prize in the 30 minute category. It was also ranked 48th in TV Guide's 50 Greatest TV Shows of All Time. In 1997, two of the show's episodes, "Latka the Playboy" and "Reverend Jim: A Space Odyssey" were respectively ranked #19 and #63 on TV Guide's 100 Greatest Episodes of All Time. In 2013, the series was ranked #35 on TV Guide's 60 Best Series of All Time and #19 by the Writers Guild of America on their list of the 101 Best Written TV Series. In 2023, Variety ranked Taxi #75 on its list of the 100 greatest TV shows of all time.

Primetime Emmy Awards
Year	Category	Nominee(s)	Episode	Result
1979	Outstanding Comedy Series	James L. Brooks, Glen Charles, Les Charles, Stan Daniels, David Davis and Ed. Weinberger		Won
1979	Outstanding Lead Actor in a Comedy Series	Judd Hirsch		Nominated
1979	Outstanding Lead Actress in a Comedy Series	Ruth Gordon	"Sugar Mama"	Won
1979	Outstanding Supporting Actor in a Comedy or Comedy-Variety or Music Series	Danny DeVito		Nominated
1979	Outstanding Writing in a Comedy or Comedy-Variety or Music Series	Michael J. Leeson	"Blind Date"	Nominated
1979	Outstanding Film Editing for a Series	M. Pam Blumenthal	"Paper Marriage"	Won
1980	Outstanding Comedy Series	James L. Brooks, Glen Charles, Les Charles, Stan Daniels and Ed. Weinberger		Won
1980	Outstanding Lead Actor in a Comedy Series	Judd Hirsch		Nominated
1980	Outstanding Directing in a Comedy Series	James Burrows	"Louie and the Nice Girl"	Won
1980	Outstanding Writing in a Comedy Series	Glen Charles and Les Charles	"Honor Thy Father"	Nominated
1980	Outstanding Achievement in Film Editing for a Series	M. Pam Blumenthal	"Louie and the Nice Girl"	Won
1981	Outstanding Comedy Series	James L. Brooks, Glen Charles, Les Charles, Stan Daniels and Ed. Weinberger		Won
1981	Outstanding Lead Actor in a Comedy Series	Judd Hirsch		Won
1981	Outstanding Lead Actress in a Comedy Series	Eileen Brennan	"Thy Boss' Wife"	Nominated
1981	Outstanding Supporting Actor in a Comedy or Variety or Music Series	Danny DeVito		Won
1981	Outstanding Directing in a Comedy Series	James Burrows	"Elaine's Strange Triangle"	Won
1981	Outstanding Writing in a Comedy Series	Glen Charles and Les Charles	"Going Home"	Nominated
1981	Outstanding Writing in a Comedy Series	Michael J. Leeson	"Tony's Sister and Jim"	Won
1981	Outstanding Writing in a Comedy Series	David Lloyd	"Elaine's Strange Triangle"	Nominated
1981	Outstanding Achievement in Film Editing for a Series	M. Pam Blumenthal and Jack Michon	"Elaine's Strange Triangle"	Won
1982	Outstanding Comedy Series	James L. Brooks, Glen Charles, Les Charles, Stan Daniels, Ken Estin, Howard Gewirtz, Ian Praiser, Richard Sakai and Ed. Weinberger		Nominated
1982	Outstanding Lead Actor in a Comedy Series	Judd Hirsch		Nominated
1982	Outstanding Lead Actress in a Comedy Series	Carol Kane	"Simka Returns"	Won
1982	Outstanding Supporting Actor in a Comedy or Variety or Music Series	Danny DeVito		Nominated
1982	Outstanding Supporting Actor in a Comedy or Variety or Music Series	Christopher Lloyd		Won
1982	Outstanding Directing in a Comedy Series	James Burrows	"Jim the Psychic"	Nominated
1982	Outstanding Writing in a Comedy Series	Barry Kemp (teleplay) and Holly Holmberg Brooks (story)	"Jim the Psychic"	Nominated
1982	Outstanding Writing in a Comedy Series	Ken Estin	"Elegant Iggy"	Won
1983	Outstanding Comedy Series	James L. Brooks, Glen Charles, Les Charles, Stan Daniels, Ken Estin, Howard Gewirtz, Ian Praiser, Richard Sakai and Ed. Weinberger		Nominated
1983	Outstanding Lead Actor in a Comedy Series	Judd Hirsch		Won
1983	Outstanding Supporting Actor in a Comedy, Variety or Music Series	Danny DeVito		Nominated
1983	Outstanding Supporting Actor in a Comedy, Variety or Music Series	Christopher Lloyd		Won
1983	Outstanding Supporting Actress in a Comedy, Variety or Music Series	Carol Kane		Won
1983	Outstanding Writing in a Comedy Series	Ken Estin	"Jim's Inheritance"	Nominated

Golden Globe Awards
Year	Category	Nominee	Result
1979	Best Television Series – Musical or Comedy	Taxi	Won
1979	Best Performance by an Actor in a Television Series – Musical or Comedy	Judd Hirsch	Nominated
1979	Best Performance by an Actor in a Supporting Role in a Series, Limited Series or Motion Picture Made for Television	Jeff Conaway	Nominated
1979	Best Performance by an Actor in a Supporting Role in a Series, Limited Series or Motion Picture Made for Television	Danny DeVito	Nominated
1979	Best Performance by an Actor in a Supporting Role in a Series, Limited Series or Motion Picture Made for Television	Andy Kaufman	Nominated
1979	Best Performance by an Actress in a Supporting Role in a Series, Limited Series or Motion Picture Made for Television	Marilu Henner	Nominated
1980	Best Television Series – Musical or Comedy	Taxi	Won (Note: Tied with Alice)
1980	Best Performance by an Actor in a Television Series – Musical or Comedy	Judd Hirsch	Nominated
1980	Best Performance by an Actor in a Supporting Role in a Series, Limited Series or Motion Picture Made for Television	Jeff Conaway	Nominated
1980	Best Performance by an Actor in a Supporting Role in a Series, Limited Series or Motion Picture Made for Television	Danny DeVito	Won (Note: Tied with Vic Tayback from Alice)
1980	Best Performance by an Actor in a Supporting Role in a Series, Limited Series or Motion Picture Made for Television	Tony Danza	Nominated
1980	Best Performance by an Actress in a Supporting Role in a Series, Limited Series or Motion Picture Made for Television	Marilu Henner	Nominated
1981	Best Television Series – Musical or Comedy	Taxi	Won
1981	Best Performance by an Actor in a Television Series – Musical or Comedy	Judd Hirsch	Nominated
1981	Best Performance by an Actor in a Supporting Role in a Series, Limited Series or Motion Picture Made for Television	Danny DeVito	Nominated
1981	Best Performance by an Actor in a Supporting Role in a Series, Limited Series or Motion Picture Made for Television	Andy Kaufman	Nominated
1981	Best Performance by an Actress in a Supporting Role in a Series, Limited Series or Motion Picture Made for Television	Marilu Henner	Nominated
1982	Best Television Series – Musical or Comedy	Taxi	Nominated
1982	Best Performance by an Actor in a Television Series – Musical or Comedy	Judd Hirsch	Nominated
1982	Best Performance by an Actor in a Supporting Role in a Series, Limited Series or Motion Picture Made for Television	Danny DeVito	Nominated
1982	Best Performance by an Actress in a Supporting Role in a Series, Limited Series or Motion Picture Made for Television	Marilu Henner	Nominated
1983	Best Television Series – Musical or Comedy	Taxi	Nominated
1983	Best Performance by an Actor in a Television Series – Musical or Comedy	Judd Hirsch	Nominated
1983	Best Performance by an Actress in a Supporting Role in a Series, Limited Series or Motion Picture Made for Television	Marilu Henner	Nominated
1983	Best Performance by an Actress in a Supporting Role in a Series, Limited Series or Motion Picture Made for Television	Carol Kane	Nominated
1984	Best Television Series – Musical or Comedy	Taxi	Nominated

== Production ==
Taxi was inspired by the non-fiction article "Night-Shifting for the Hip Fleet" by Mark Jacobson, which appeared in the September 22, 1975, issue of New York magazine. This article helped suggest the idea for the show to James L. Brooks and David Davis, though nothing from the article was used directly. The article was a profile of several drivers who worked the night shift for a New York cab company.

The series was produced on Stage 23 at Paramount Studios in Los Angeles, California, from July 5, 1978, to February 18, 1983.

When the series was cancelled by ABC, it seemed for a time that the premium cable television network HBO would pick up the series. When it did not, the series was picked up by NBC, which at first kept it on at its ABC time slot of Thursday 9:30 p.m following the first season of Cheers. An NBC promo for Taxi's move to the network featured Danny DeVito in character as Louie saying "Same time, better station!" While the series was able to reach the threshold for syndication on NBC, the network canceled the series for good in 1983, by which point much of the cast (notably DeVito, Danza, and Lloyd) were becoming stars in their own right. Additionally, Kaufman, who during the series final season was famously embroiled in a public feud with professional wrestling icon Jerry Lawler (which was later proven to be an elaborate work), would be diagnosed with lung cancer soon after the series ended and died a year after its final cancellation.

The taxicabs shown in the show are Checker A11s.

== Opening and closing sequence ==
The opening titles show a Checker cab driving east across the Queensboro Bridge. The footage originally was intended as a "bridge" between scenes and is only about fifteen seconds long; parts of it are repeated to fill the opening. Driving the vehicle is cast member Tony Danza. The closing version consisted of Cab 804, the drivers' favorite cab ("Memories of Cab 804"), driving into the night.

=== Theme music ===
Bob James wrote the opening theme, "Angela", which had been intended for a sequence in episode #3 ("Blind Date"). The producers liked this slower, more melancholic tune better than the up-tempo opening theme they had originally chosen ("Touchdown"), and were able to make the switch before the first episode aired. Both songs are on James's 1978 album, Touchdown.

It uses the "Sunny" chord progression.

In 1983, James released The Genie, an LP containing much of the incidental music he had written for Taxi during its run.

== Syndication ==
Reruns of Taxi began airing in syndication in 1983 on 64 television stations immediately after NBC's cancelation; It has been airing in syndication since. The program also aired on Nick at Nite from 1994 to 2001. Taxi previously aired reruns Sunday nights on MeTV as part of their "Last Laughs" block. Hulu, Pluto TV and Amazon Prime Video have all five seasons; however, as of February 2023, only Paramount+ has every episode, including some available with original music for the first time outside of the original and syndicated runs. In the UK, Taxi aired on BBC1 with repeats airing on Paramount Comedy 2 and CBS Drama. As of 2020, the series has been airing weeknights on Decades (later rebranded as Catchy Comedy) as part of its “Smartcoms Across The Decades” block (later re-named as the "Smart and Catchy Sitcoms" block). Taxi has also aired on Decades (now Catchy Comedy) as part of their weekend binges called "The Decades Binge" (later renamed to "The Catchy Binge" when it was rebranded to Catchy Comedy), with its most recent binge on April 13, 2025.

== Cast reunions ==
Danny DeVito hosted an episode of Saturday Night Live (on NBC) soon after Taxi was canceled after the fourth season. During the opening monologue, DeVito read a letter supposedly from his mother asking God to forgive ABC for cancelling the show, adding that "but I'll understand if you don't." A filmed bit had him driving around New York looking morose until inspiration strikes, and he blows up the ABC building. In addition, the Taxi cast members were given an opportunity for closure, which up to that point had been denied for them due to the abrupt cancellation. The actors took their "final" bows during DeVito's opening monologue, only to have NBC (which aired SNL) pick up the show.

More than 15 years later, most of the cast returned to play their younger-selves and briefly re-enact scenes for the Kaufman biopic Man on the Moon. Judd Hirsch, Marilu Henner, Jeff Conaway, Carol Kane, Randall Carver, J. Alan Thomas and Christopher Lloyd all reprised their roles. The only two living members of the principal cast who did not were Danny DeVito, who produced and co-starred in the film as Kaufman's manager George Shapiro, and Tony Danza, who at the time of filming was performing in A View from the Bridge on Broadway.

Several of the cast members (along with cast members from other Judd Hirsch and Bob Newhart vehicles) reunited in different roles for an episode of the Judd Hirsch/Bob Newhart series George & Leo.

In January 2009, Danny DeVito mentioned wanting to make a Taxi reunion movie.

== Home media ==
All five seasons of Taxi have been released from Paramount Home Entertainment. The first three seasons of Taxi were released on DVD in Region 1 between 2004 and 2005. It took almost four years until Paramount released The Fourth Season on September 22, 2009, and The (Fifth &) Final Season on December 22, 2009 (the last two seasons were released through CBS Home Entertainment). As of October 2014, all seasons have been released in Germany (Region 2).

On November 11, 2014, CBS Home Entertainment released Taxi- The Complete Series on DVD in Region 1. All 114 episodes are featured on a 17-disc collection.

DVD Name	Ep #	Release dates	
DVD Name	Ep #	Region 1	Region 2
The Complete First Season	22	October 12, 2004	April 28, 2008
The Complete Second Season	24	February 1, 2005	February 9, 2009
The Complete Third Season	20	September 13, 2005	TBA
The Fourth Season	24	September 22, 2009	TBA
The (Fifth &) Final Season	24	December 22, 2009	TBA
The Complete Series	114	November 11, 2014	May 30, 2016
