= Jeff Conaway =

American actor (1950–2011)

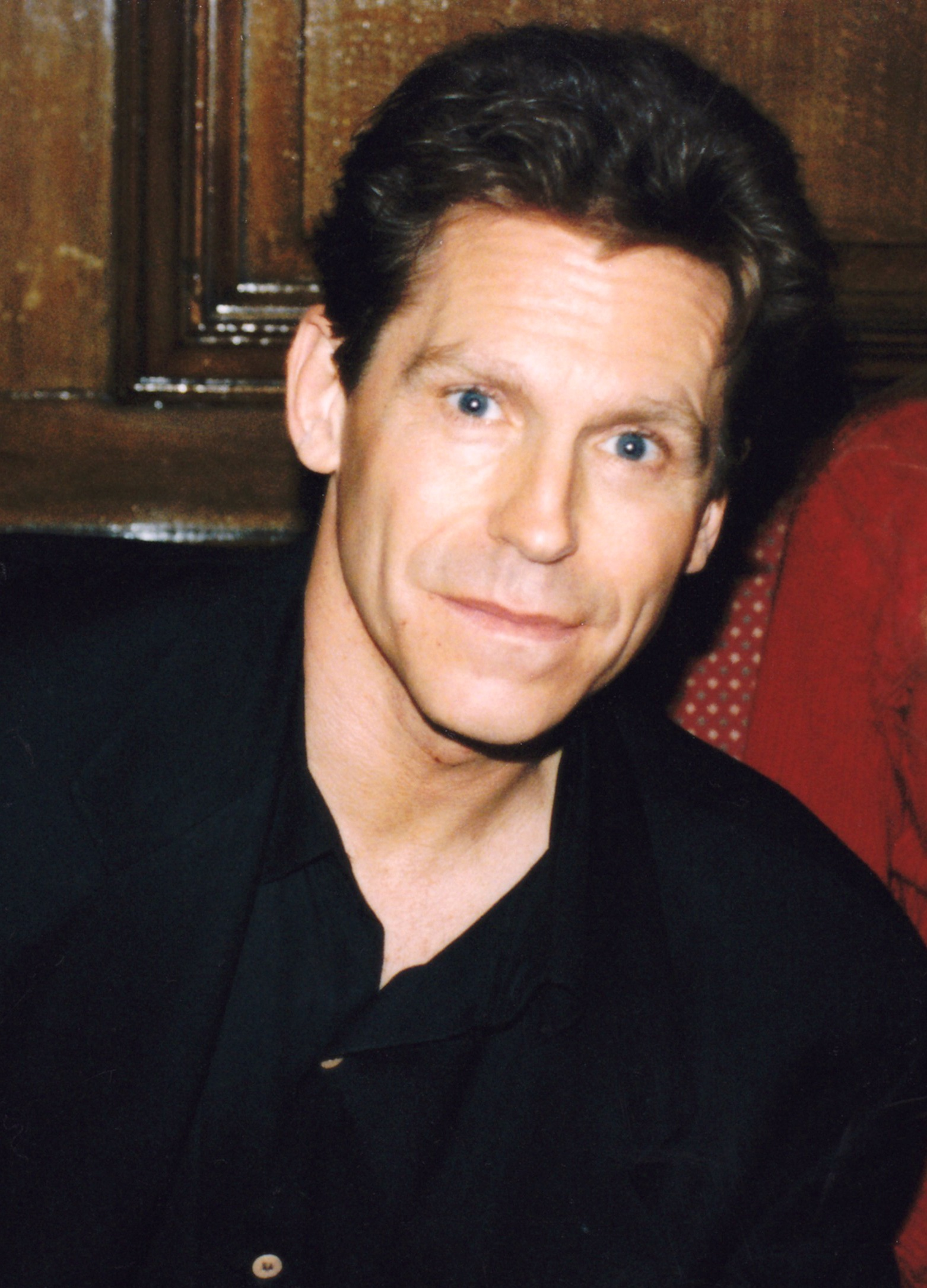
- Conaway in 1998
- Born: Jeffrey Charles William Michael Conaway; October 5, 1950; Manhattan, New York, U.S.
- Died: May 27, 2011 (aged 60); Encino, California, U.S.
- Occupation: Actor
- Years active: 1971–2011
- Spouses: Unknown (m. 1971; ann. 1971); Rona Newton-John (m. 1980; div. 1985) Kerri Young (m. 1990; div. 2000)

Jeffrey Charles William Michael Conaway (October 5, 1950 – May 27, 2011) was an American actor. He portrayed Kenickie in the film Grease and had roles in four television series: struggling actor Bobby Wheeler in Taxi (1978–1982), Prince Erik Greystone in Wizards and Warriors, security officer Zack Allan on Babylon 5, and Howard Griffin on Murder, She Wrote. Conaway was featured in the first and second seasons of the reality television series Celebrity Rehab with Dr. Drew.

== Early life, family and education ==
Conaway was born on October 5, 1950, in Manhattan, New York City, New York, and raised in the Astoria, Flushing, and Forest Hills neighborhoods of Queens, New York City. His father Charles was an actor, producer, and publisher. His mother Helen, an actress who went by the stage name Mary Ann Brooks, taught music at New York City's Brook Conservatory. They divorced when he was 3, and Conaway and his two older sisters lived with their mother.

He spent time living with his grandparents in South Carolina, which gave him a Southern accent. When Conaway accompanied his mother to a casting call for the Broadway play All the Way Home, a story set in Knoxville, Tennessee, the 10-year-old Conaway's accent helped him earn a featured role. The play was a critical and audience success, with nominations and wins for major theatrical awards, and ran 333 performances and one preview from November 29, 1960, to September 16, 1961. Conaway remained for the entire run, then toured with the national company of the play Critic's Choice. Conaway also worked as a child model.

He attended high school at the Quintano School for Young Professionals. After playing with the rock band 3 1/2 beginning at age 15, he attended the North Carolina School of the Arts and later transferred to New York University.

== Acting career ==
While at NYU, Conaway appeared in television commercials and had the lead in a school production of The Threepenny Opera. He made his film debut in the 1971 romantic drama Jennifer on My Mind, which also featured future stars Robert De Niro and Barry Bostwick.

=== Grease and Taxi ===
The following year, Conaway appeared in the original cast of the Broadway musical Grease, as an understudy to several roles including that of the lead male character, Danny Zuko, and eventually succeeded role-originator Barry Bostwick. He played Zuko for about 30 months, while his friend John Travolta, with whom he shared a manager, later joined the play first in the supporting role of Doody. The two reunited in the 1978 motion picture musical Grease, in which Travolta played Zuko and Conaway his buddy Kenickie.

Conaway as Bobby Wheeler in Taxi

After breaking into series television in 1975 with Happy Days, this was followed by guest spots in several other TV shows, and three more films including Grease.

Conaway appeared as a guest in an episode of The Mary Tyler Moore Show. The producers of Moore's show were developing a new series called Taxi and considered Conaway for a role of a struggling college student which went to Randall Carver. Conaway ultimately beat out Cleavon Little for the role of Bobby Wheeler, an aspiring actor who worked at a taxi company. The new show premiered in late 1978, and was a critical and popular success.

After the third season, Conaway departed Taxi but two of his performances carried over into the fourth season and he appeared once more as a special guest. The primary reason for his leaving Taxi was drug abuse, which worsened after season one. Writer Sam Simon recalled in 2008 how during production of his first script for that show (season 3, episode 12) a missing Conaway was found in his dressing room, too high on drugs to perform. Conaway's dialogue for that episode was divided between his co-stars Danny DeVito and Christopher Lloyd, who delivered the jokes well enough that Conaway's absence had little negative effect on the episode. This development caused the show's producers to realize Conaway was expendable, which contributed to his termination. Conaway was reported as dissatisfied with being typecast as a "blond bimbo" and the "butt of struggling-actor jokes," and found the role repetitive. He also felt creatively stymied, stating he "loved the role" but he also realized Bobby was not as distinctive as other characters on the show: "[N]obody else could do Louie or Jim [DeVito and Lloyd's characters, respectively], they were such defined characters. But Bobby — anybody could walk in and say, 'Hi, Alex.' [to Judd Hirsh's character]."

=== After Taxi ===
Conaway starred in the short-lived 1983 fantasy-spoof series Wizards and Warriors. He made guest appearances on such shows as Barnaby Jones, George and Leo, and Murder, She Wrote. He appeared in films such as Jawbreaker, Elvira: Mistress of the Dark, and Do You Wanna Know a Secret?

From 1989 to 1990, he played Mick Savage on The Bold and the Beautiful. In 1993, he appeared onstage in Real Life Photographs. From 1994 to 1999, he played Sergeant, later promoted to Security Chief, Zack Allan on Babylon 5. In 2010, he provided voice-over for the English version of the animated short film Dante's Hell Animated (released in 2013), in which he is credited as "Hollywood legend Jeff Conaway".

== Music career ==
In addition to acting, Conaway dabbled in music. In the mid-1960s, he was the lead singer and guitarist for a rock band, The 3 1/2, which recorded four singles for Cameo Records in 1966 and 1967:

- "Don't Cry to Me Babe" / "R & B In C" (Cameo 425, 1966)
- "Problem Child" / "Hey Mom Hey Dad" (Cameo 442, 1966)
- "Hey Gyp" / "Hey Kitty Cool Kitty" (Cameo 451, 1967) (This single was produced by Peter Noone of Herman's Hermits, who also wrote the B-side. The A-side is a song by Donovan.)
- "Angel Baby (Don't You Ever Leave Me)" / "You Turned Your Back on Love" (Cameo 485, 1967)

In 1979, Conaway recorded a self-titled debut album for Columbia Records. "City Boy" was released as a single. Bruce Springsteen's manager, Mike Appel, produced the album. In 2000, he released the album It Don't Make Sense You Can't Make Peace on the KEGMusic label.

== Personal life ==
His stepson, Emerson Newton-John, is a race car driver.

=== Marriages ===
Conaway was married three times. His first, short-lived marriage (when he was 21) was to a dancer he had been seeing for two years. It was annulled. His second marriage, from 1980 until their divorce in 1985, was to Rona Newton-John, elder sister of his Grease co-star, Olivia Newton-John. His third marriage was to Kerri Young from 1990 to 2000.

=== Health problems ===
After experiencing a crisis in the mid-1980s, Conaway came to grips with having a substance abuse problem. He underwent treatment in the late 1980s and often spoke candidly about his addictions.

By the mid-2000s, he had relapsed. Conaway appeared in VH1's Celebrity Fit Club, but was forced to leave and entered rehabilitation. In early 2008, Conaway appeared with other celebrities in the VH1 reality series Celebrity Rehab with Dr. Drew. The show revealed that Conaway was addicted to cocaine, alcohol, and painkillers, and that he was in a codependent relationship with his girlfriend, who was also a user of prescription opiates. Conaway had suffered a back injury earlier in his career on the set of Grease while filming the "Greased Lightning" scene, which had been exacerbated by lifting boxes in his home, and he had turned to substances to manage the pain.

Conaway's appearance on the show's first and second seasons drew much attention because of his severely crippled state, his constant threats to leave the facility, and his frequent inability to speak clearly. Upon arrival at the Pasadena Recovery Center (which was filmed as part of Celebrity Rehab's first episode), Conaway, using a wheelchair, arrived drunk, mumbling to Dr. Drew that he had binged on cocaine and Jack Daniel's whiskey the previous night.

During the second episode of Celebrity Rehab's first season, Conaway, fed up with his back pain, withdrawal symptoms, and the humiliation of having to be assisted while using the toilet, told Pinsky that he was thinking of killing himself. After Pinsky asked him to elaborate upon how he would carry out a suicidal act, Conaway glared at the mirror in his room and said, "I see myself breaking that mirror and slicing my fucking throat with it." During group sessions, Conaway revealed he was "tortured" during his childhood, as older boys in his neighborhood would put him into dangerous situations, tying him up and threatening him. He also related that he was molested when he was seven years old. Conaway stated that he had been an addict since he was a teenager.

With John Travolta's support, Conaway took courses and auditing from the Church of Scientology to cope with his drug problem and depression, although he did not intend to become a Scientologist.

In June 2009, Conaway joined Celebrity Rehab castmate Mary Carey at the premiere of her parody film Celebrity Pornhab with Dr. Screw.

In August 2009, Conaway was interviewed by Entertainment Tonight. In the interview, the actor claimed he was much better after a fifth back operation, and that he had yet to use painkillers again. He also discussed unscrupulous doctors and enablers.

In March 2010, shortly after the death of actor Corey Haim, Conaway told E! News that he had warned Haim about dying because of prescription drug abuse.

== Death ==
On May 11, 2011, Conaway was found unconscious from what was initially described as an overdose of substances believed to be pain medication and was taken to Encino-Tarzana Regional Medical Center in Encino, California, where he was listed in critical condition. After initial reports, Drew Pinsky, who had treated Conaway for substance abuse, said the actor was suffering not from a drug overdose, but rather from pneumonia with sepsis, for which he was placed into an induced coma.

Though his drug use did not cause his pneumonia, it hampered Conaway's ability to recognize how severely ill he was; he did not seek treatment until it was too late.

On May 26, 2011, Conaway's family took him off life support after doctors determined they could do nothing to revive him. Conaway died the following morning at the age of 60. Conaway's doctor attributed his death to his addiction, stating, "What happens is, like with most opiate addicts, eventually they take a little too much ... and they aspirate, so what's in their mouth gets into their lungs ... That's what happened with Jeff."

An autopsy performed on Conaway revealed that the actor died of various causes, including aspiration pneumonia and encephalopathy, attributable to drug overdoses.

== Awards ==
Golden Globe Award

- 1978 nomination, Best Supporting Actor, Comedy or Musical Series (for Taxi)
- 1979 nomination, Best Supporting Actor, Comedy or Musical Series (for Taxi)

== Filmography ==
=== Film ===
Year	Title	Role	Notes
1971	Jennifer on My Mind	Hanki	
1976	The Eagle Has Landed	Frazier	
1977	Delta County, U.S.A.	Terry Nicholas	
1977	Pete's Dragon	Willie Gogan	
1977	I Never Promised You a Rose Garden	Lactamaeon	
1978	Grease	Kenickie	
1980	For the Love of It	Russ	
1984	Covergirl	T.C. Sloane	
1986	The Patriot	Mitchell	
1988	Elvira: Mistress of the Dark	Travis	
1989	Ghost Writer	Tom Farrell	
1989	The Banker	Cowboy	
1989	Tale of Two Sisters	Taxi driver	
1990	The Sleeping Car	Bud Sorenson	
1991	Dumb Luck in Vegas		
1991	Total Exposure	Peter Keynes	
1991	A Time to Die	Frank	
1992	Mirror Images	Jeffrey Blair	
1992	Eye of the Storm	Tom Edwards	
1992	Almost Pregnant	Charlie Alderson	
1992	Bikini Summer II / Bikini Summer 2	Stu Stocker (also director)	
1993	Alien Intruder	Borman	
1993	In a Moment of Passion	Werner Soehnen	
1993	L.A. Goddess	Sean	
1993	Sunset Strip	Tony	
1993	It's Showtime	Rinaldi	
1994	2002: The Rape of Eden	Reverend	
1997	The Last Embrace	Jagger	
1998	Shadow of Doubt	Bixby	
1999	Jawbreaker	Marcie's Father	
1999	Man on the Moon	Jeff Conaway - Taxi Actor	Uncredited
2001	Do You Wanna Know a Secret?	Agent Owen Sacker	
2002	Curse of the Forty-Niner	Reverend Sutter	
2002	The Biz	Gavin Elliot	
2003	Miner's Massacre		
2004	Ymi	Digger's Dad	
2004	Pan Dulce	Gabriel Levine	
2004	The Corner Office	Dick	
2006	The Pool 2	Agent Frank Gun	
2005	From Behind the Sunflower	Leo	
2006	Living the Dream	Dick	
2006	The Utah Murder Project	Sheriff Dan Patterson	
2008	Wrestling	Franklin Conner	
2010	Dante's Inferno: Abandon All Hope	40-minute short film	
2010	Ladron	Commander Hill	
2010	Dark Games	Tom Doyle	Released 2017

=== Television ===
Year	Title	Role	Notes
1975–1976	Happy Days	Rocko	2 episodes
1975	Joe Forrester		1 episode, 1975 "The Best Laid Schemes"
1975	Movin' On	Mike / Mike Miller	2 episodes, 1974 "Landslide" (S01, E16), 1975 "The Long Way To Nowhere" (S02, Ep10)
1976–1977	Barnaby Jones	Jeff Saunders	2 episodes
1976	The Mary Tyler Moore Show	Kenny Stevens	1 episode
1977	Delta County, USA	Terry Nicholas	TV movie-ABC
1978–1982	Taxi	Bobby Wheeler	69 episodes
1978	Kojak	Bert Gaines	1 episode "May the Horse Be with You"
1978	California Jam II	Host and interviewer	TV Special by ABC, first aired on May 19, 1978
1979	Breaking Up Is Hard to Do	Roy Fletcher	TV movie
1980	For the Love of It	Russ	TV movie
1981	The Nashville Grab	Buddy Walker	TV movie
1983	Making of a Male Model	Chuck Lanyard	TV movie
1983	Wizards and Warriors	Prince Erik Greystone	8 episodes
1984–1994	Murder, She Wrote	Howard Griffin / Nolan Walsh / Tom Powell	4 episodes, 1984, 1986, 1993, 1994
1985	Berrenger's	John Higgins	11 episodes
1985	The Love Boat	Andy Jackson	1 episode
1985	Who's the Boss?	Jeff	1 episode, 1985
1986	Matlock (NBC)	Daniel Ward	1 episode, "The Affair" (S01, E5)
1987	Bay Coven	Josh McGwin	TV movie
1987	Hotel	Eric Madison	1 episode
1984–1987	Mike Hammer	Harry Farris	2 episodes, 1984 and 1987
1987	Stingray	Ty Gardner	1 episode
1987	Tales from the Darkside	Peter	1 episode
1988	The Dirty Dozen: The Fatal Mission	Sergeant Holt	Television movie
1989-1990	The Bold and the Beautiful	Mick Savage	61 episodes
1989	Freddy's Nightmares	Buddy Powers	1 episode
1989	Monsters	Phil	1 episode
1990	Good Grief	Winston Payne	1 episode
1990	Shades of L.A.	Richard	1 episode
1993	Matlock (ABC)	Slick/Waiter	1 episode, "Matlock's Bad, Bad, Bad Dream" (S08, E11)
1994–1998	Babylon 5	Zack Allan	74 episodes
1995	Burke's Law	Dr. Alex Kenyon	1 episode
1995	Hope and Gloria	Bud Green	1 episode
1996	Mr. & Mrs. Smith	Rich Edwards	1 episode
1997	George & Leo		1 episode, "The Cameo Episode"
1998	Babylon 5: The River of Souls	Zack Allan	TV movie
1998	Babylon 5: Thirdspace	Zack Allan	TV movie
1999	Babylon 5: A Call to Arms	Zack Allan	TV movie
2000	L.A. 7	Manager of Radio Station	1 episode
2004	She Spies	Zachary Mason	1 episode
2006	The John Kerwin Show	Guest	1 episode
2012	Planet Houston	Scareglow	Voice, 1 episode, "Dedicated to Jeff Conaway", Conaway's final project
