= Randall Carver =

American actor

- Born: May 25, 1946 (age 80); Fort Worth, Texas, U.S.
- Education: West Texas State University; University of California, Los Angeles
- Occupation: Actor
- Years active: 1969–present
- Known for: Taxi

Randall Carver (born May 25, 1946 in Fort Worth, Texas) is an American actor. Carver started his acting career in the late 1960s, and had roles in films and television. He portrayed John Burns throughout the first season (1978–79) of Taxi.

== Early life and education ==
Carver, a Texan native, graduated from Missouri Military Academy as an officer cadet, second lieutenant and then West Texas State University with a bachelor's degree. Five months after completing his uncredited debut in the 1969 film Midnight Cowboy, he served the United States Army as a tank platoon leader, first lieutenant of the Korean Demilitarized Zone for at least one year till his honorable discharge. Then he also graduated with a Master of Fine Arts degree from the University of California, Los Angeles.

== Career ==
Besides other minor roles, Carver's first major onscreen appearance was the 1973 drama film Time to Run as Jeff Cole, an environmentalist who attempts to sabotage his father's (Ed Nelson) nuclear power plant. He portrayed Jeffrey DeVito, gangster husband of Cathy Shumway (Debralee Scott), in the 1977–78 television series Forever Fernwood. He also made guest appearances in other television series, like Emergency!, Room 222, The Six Million Dollar Man, and The Waltons, and appeared in stage plays and in made-for-television films during the 1970s.

=== Taxi ===
In the first season (1978–79) of the television sitcom series Taxi, Carver portrayed John Burns, "a naïve student who lands in the taxi business more by default than design." Marley Brant in her book Happier Days (2006) praised Carver's acting but found his character John not well developed, even with his wedding subplot. Carver said,

[The writers] were always trying what to do with this guy [...] There were so many characters. Most of us were on the stage at the same time [...] and seemed [like] everybody was kind of vying for their moment in the sun. A couple of times Tony Danza and I changed lines at the director's or producers' requests [...] They'd do retooling and restructuring, and while it was not always pleasant at times, you can sort of see from this distance that everything worked out for the best [...]

Carver's character did not return for the second season when Christopher Lloyd was added, having played the character Jim Ignatowski in one episode of the first season.

=== Post-Taxi career ===
Carver appeared in other films and television programs thereafter. He made a guest appearance as the fiancé of "a girl from West Virginia" (Loni Anderson) in one segment of the two-part 1980 episode, which was filmed in 1979, of the television series The Love Boat, alongside other guest stars of the similar segment Donny Osmond and Rich Little. He portrayed a killer in the 1980 made-for-television film Detour to Terror. He portrayed Lieutenant Vaughn Beuhler, the "doltish [lieutenant and the station's] program director," one of the principal characters in the 1980 sitcom The Six O'Clock Follies, set in the television station in Saigon, South Vietnam, in 1967 (during the Vietnam War). He also appeared in The Norm Show and Malcolm in the Middle in late 1990s and 2000s. Carver portrayed Mr. Bankside in the 2007 film There Will Be Blood.

== Personal life ==
Carver is married to writer Shelley Herman.

== Accolades ==
Carver was inducted into West Texas A&M University's Branding Iron Theatre Hall of Fame on April 22, 2017, and then Missouri Military Academy's 2022 Hall of Fame.

== Selected filmography ==
Films

- Midnight Cowboy (1969), uncredited role
- Time to Run (1973), Jeff Cole – Carver's first major role
- Detour to Terror (1980, TV), Nick – killer
- There Will Be Blood (2007), Mr. Bankside

Television series

- Emergency!, various roles – (1972)
- Room 222, Henry Drucker – "Man, If You're So Smart" (1973)
- The Waltons, Monty Vandenberg – "The Deed" (1973)
- The Six Million Dollar Man, PFC Robert E. Barris – "Survival of the Fittest" (1974)
- Forever Fernwood, Jeffrey DeVito – rebranded title of Mary Hartman, Mary Hartman (1977-78)
- Taxi, John Burns – (1978–79)
- The Love Boat, Elmar Fargas – Season 3, Episode 18–19 (1980)
- The Six O'Clock Follies, Lt. Vaughn Beuhler – (1980)
- The Norm Show, various roles – (1999-2001)
- Malcolm in the Middle, Joshua – "The Block Party" (2004)
