= Ed. Weinberger =

American screenwriter

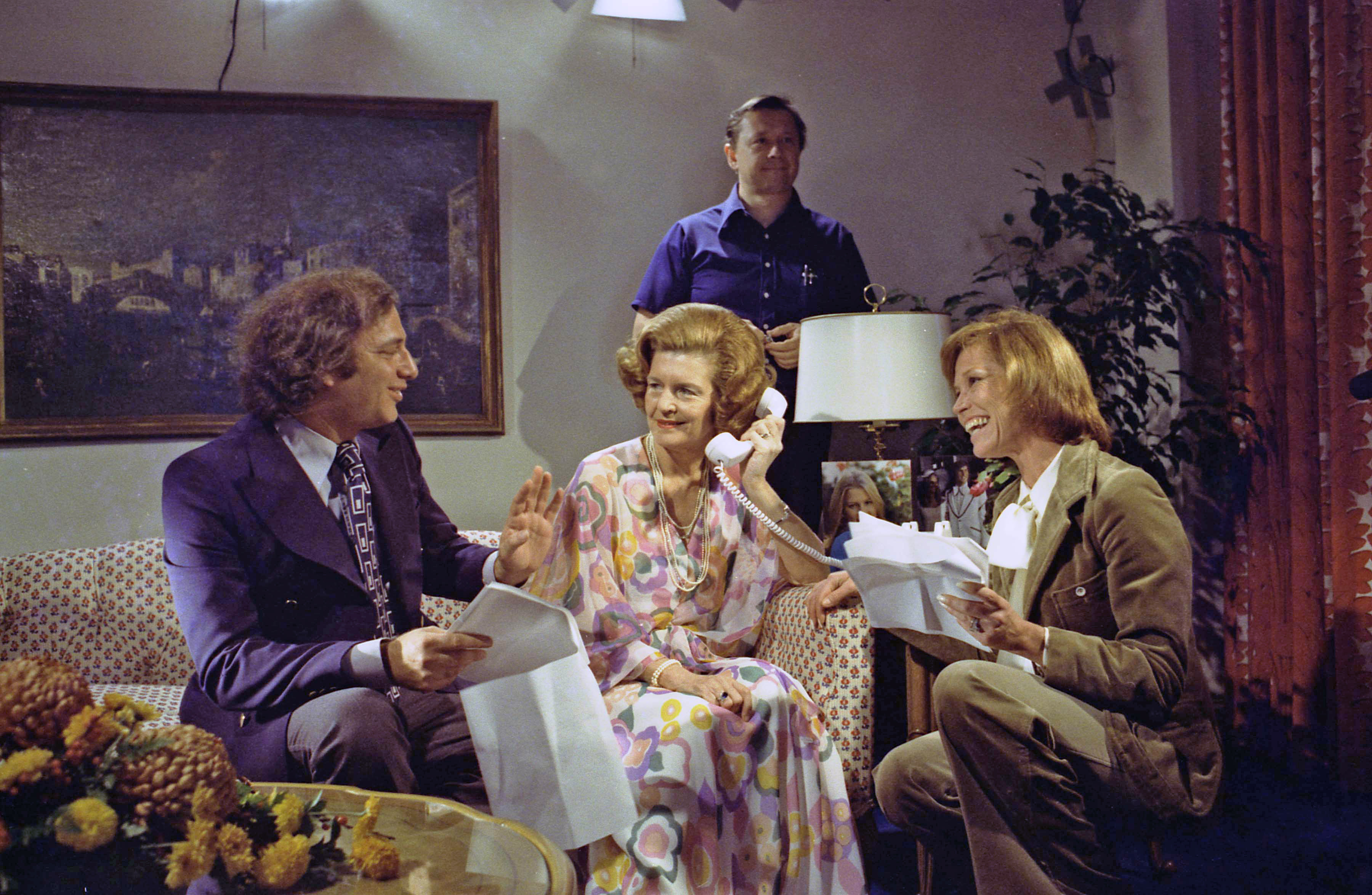
Ed. Weinberger (left) with First Lady Betty Ford and Mary Tyler Moore in 1975

Edwin B. "Ed." Weinberger (born September 1, 1945) is an American screenwriter and television producer.

== Life and career ==
Born in Philadelphia, the only son of Jewish butcher Leon and his wife Helen Weinberger, Weinberger began his TV career after he dropped out of Columbia University, worked for such stand-up comedians as Dick Gregory, Richard Pryor, and Bill Cosby. His first job in television was writing for The Tonight Show Starring Johnny Carson. He also wrote for The Bob Hope Special, The Bill Cosby Show, and The Dean Martin Variety Hour.

Weinberger, along with James L. Brooks, David Davis, Allan Burns, and Stan Daniels, formed the core of MTM Enterprises. In 1977, they left for Paramount Pictures and started the John Charles Walters Company. Weinberger also played Mr. Walters in the logo. The series Taxi was created the following year. He also wrote and co-created The Cosby Show, which ran for eight years. Weinberger went on to create and executive produce several other sitcoms, including Amen, Mr. President, Dear John, Baby Talk, and Sparks. In 1985, he became president of television production company Carson Productions, replacing John J. McMahon.

Weinberger has won a Peabody Award, three Golden Globe Awards, and nine Emmy Awards. He has also received the Writers Guild of America Lifetime Achievement Award.

He has been married to TV actress Carlene Watkins since 1984; the couple have two sons, Jack and Sam. With his son, Jack, Weinberger wrote and produced the musical play Mary and Joseph, which had a national tour in 2007–08.

Weinberger explained in 2000 that he began using the abbreviation "Ed." when he was eight years old, admitting that "it's an affectation that's gotten out of hand."

In 2012, he sued two former business managers, claiming they had failed to obtain revenue for him from his work on Amen. His case was dismissed in 2013 by the Los Angeles Superior Court, but that decision was overturned in 2015 by the appellate court.

== Accolades ==
Year	Association	Category	Work	Result
1973	Primetime Emmy Awards	Outstanding Comedy Series	The Mary Tyler Moore Show	Nominated
1974	Primetime Emmy Awards	Outstanding Comedy Series	The Mary Tyler Moore Show	Nominated
1974	Writers Guild of America Awards	Episodic Comedy	The Mary Tyler Moore Show: "The Lars Affair"	Nominated
1975	Primetime Emmy Awards	Outstanding Comedy Series	The Mary Tyler Moore Show	Won
1975	Primetime Emmy Awards	Outstanding Writing for a Comedy Series	The Mary Tyler Moore Show: "Will Mary Richards Go to Jail?"	Won
1975	Writers Guild of America Awards	Episodic Comedy	The Mary Tyler Moore Show: "Will Mary Richards Go to Jail?"	Nominated
1976	Primetime Emmy Awards	Outstanding Comedy Series	The Mary Tyler Moore Show	Won
1977	Primetime Emmy Awards	Outstanding Comedy Series	The Mary Tyler Moore Show	Won
1977	Primetime Emmy Awards	Outstanding Writing for a Comedy Series	The Mary Tyler Moore Show: "The Last Show"	Won
1978	Writers Guild of America Awards	Episodic Comedy	The Mary Tyler Moore Show: "The Last Show"	Nominated
1979	Primetime Emmy Awards	Outstanding Comedy Series	Taxi	Won
1980	Primetime Emmy Awards	Outstanding Comedy Series	Taxi	Won
1980	Primetime Emmy Awards	Outstanding Writing for a Comedy Series	The Associates: "The Censors"	Nominated
1981	Primetime Emmy Awards	Outstanding Comedy Series	Taxi	Won
1981	Writers Guild of America Awards	Episodic Comedy	The Associates: "The Censors"	Nominated
1982	Primetime Emmy Awards	Outstanding Comedy Series	Taxi	Nominated
1983	Primetime Emmy Awards	Outstanding Comedy Series	Taxi	Nominated
1985	Primetime Emmy Awards	Outstanding Writing for a Comedy Series	The Cosby Show: "Pilot"	Won
