= List of Rhoda episodes =

The following is a listing of the 106 half-hour episodes of Rhoda aired during its run on CBS from September 9, 1974, to December 9, 1978, and the four half-hour episodes subsequently aired in syndication.

== Series overview ==
Season	Episodes	Originally released		Rank	Rating
Season	Episodes	First released	Last released	Rank	Rating
1	25	September 9, 1974	March 10, 1975	6	26.3
2	24	September 8, 1975	March 1, 1976	7	24.4
3	24	September 20, 1976	March 13, 1977	33	19.7
4	24	October 2, 1977	April 23, 1978	25	20.1
5	13	September 23, 1978	December 9, 1978	95	12.7

== Episodes ==
=== Season 1 (1974–1975) ===
- Season 1 of Rhoda consisted of 25 half-hour episodes, including the two-part, one-hour wedding episode.
- The show originally aired on CBS on Monday nights at 9:30 p.m., between Maude and Medical Center.
- The first season's opening credits consisted of photographs of her souvenirs that define Rhoda Morgenstern's life, and was narrated by Valerie Harper.
- The closing credits consisted of Rhoda crossing Broadway and Seventh Avenue in Times Square. Here, Rhoda attempts her version of Mary Tyler Moore's trademark hat toss, but the hat slips from her hand and falls to the ground. This remained in use until Season 3.

No. overall	No. in season	Title	Directed by	Written by	Original release date	Prod. code
1	1	"Joe"	Robert Moore	David Davis and Lorenzo Music	September 9, 1974	4151
Rhoda falls for a divorced businessman named Joe when she returns to New York on vacation. Note: A pre-credit sequence featuring Rhoda and Mary Richards (Mary Tyler Moore) at the Minneapolis airport was seen on the original broadcast, which was cut from syndication and DVD prints.
2	2	"You Can Go Home Again"	Robert Moore	Pat Nardo and Gloria Banta	September 16, 1974	4152
Rhoda tries to find a cheap apartment in New York. Note: Henry Winkler from Happy Days guest stars.
3	3	"I'll Be Loving You, Sometimes"	Alan Rafkin	Norman Barasch and Carroll Moore	September 23, 1974	4154
Rhoda is shocked that Joe wants to date other people. Howard Hesseman guest stars. Note: Stock footage from Animal World is shown.
4	4	"Parents' Day"	Robert Moore	Charlotte Brown	September 30, 1974	4155
Rhoda is nervous about meeting Joe's parents (Robert Alda and Paula Victor) and him meeting hers.
5	5	"The Lady in Red"	Robert Moore	Gail Parent	October 7, 1974	4153
A publisher shows interest in a book Rhoda wrote about the bright side of being overweight. Note: Guest starring Louise Latham, Robert Moore and James Burrows.
6	6	"Pop Goes the Question"	Robert Moore	Norman Barasch and Carroll Moore	October 14, 1974	4158
Joe pops the question to Rhoda, but not the one she wants to hear. Note: Mary Tyler Moore makes an appearance in the final scene.
7	7	"The Shower"	Robert Moore	Gail Parent	October 21, 1974	4157
Brenda invites Rhoda's old high school friends to her bridal shower. Note: Guest starring Linda Lavin.
8–9	8–9	"Rhoda's Wedding"	Robert Moore	James L. Brooks; Allan Burns; David Davis; Lorenzo Music; Norman Barasch and Carroll Moore; David Lloyd	October 28, 1974	4160
Rhoda's wedding day is plagued with complications that could ruin the big event. Note: Special one-hour episode featuring wedding guests Mary Richards (Mary Tyler Moore), Lou Grant (Edward Asner), Murray Slaughter (Gavin MacLeod), Georgette Franklin (Georgia Engel) and Phyllis Lindstrom (Cloris Leachman).
10	10	"The Honeymoon"	Alan Rafkin	Pat Nardo and Gloria Banta	November 4, 1974	4159
Rhoda's parents give her and Joe tickets to a Caribbean cruise as a wedding present.
11	11	"9-E is Available"	Robert Moore	Charlotte Brown	November 11, 1974	4163
Joe and Rhoda try to find a perfect apartment. Note: Guest starring Pamela Bellwood.
12	12	"I'm a Little Late, Folks"	Robert Moore	Norman Barasch and Carroll Moore	November 18, 1974	4164
Since Joe's finances are going bad, Rhoda's afraid to tell him she may be pregnant.
13	13	"Anything Wrong?"	Robert Moore	Coleman Mitchell and Geoffrey Neigher	November 25, 1974	4162
Something is bothering Joe, and he can't seem to tell Rhoda.
14	14	"'S Wonderful"	Robert Moore	Marilyn Suzanne Miller	December 2, 1974	4156
Rhoda suspects that Brenda's new boyfriend (Barry Brown) may be married.
15	15	"Good-Bye Charlie"	Robert Moore	Charlotte Brown	December 9, 1974	4165
Rhoda takes an immediate dislike to Joe's best friend Charlie (Richard Schaal).
16	16	"Guess What I Got You for the Holidays"	Robert Moore	Coleman Mitchell and Geoffrey Neigher	December 16, 1974	4166
Joe has lot of debts to pay and he may lose his business.
17	17	"Whattya Think It's There For?"	Jerry Belson	Coleman Mitchell and Geoffrey Neigher	January 6, 1975	4167
Joe finally asks Rhoda's parents for a loan when he gets close to bankruptcy.
18	18	"Not Made for Each Other"	Robert Moore	Charlotte Brown	January 13, 1975	4168
Rhoda takes her shy, lonely friend Myrna (Barbara Sharma) under her wing and tries fixing her up with Charlie.
19	19	"Strained Interlude"	Robert Moore	Coleman Mitchell and Geoffrey Neigher	January 20, 1975	4169
Rhoda worries about what Joe will say if she accepts a dinner invitation from an old boyfriend (Allen Garfield).
20	20	"Everything I Have Is Yours...Almost"	Jay Sandrich	Michael Leeson	January 27, 1975	4170
Rhoda thinks Joe is hiding something serious when she finds a doctor's bill in the mail.
21	21	"Chest Pains"	Robert Moore	Coleman Mitchell and Geoffrey Neigher	February 3, 1975	4171
Ida informs Rhoda and Brenda that she's very sick. Note: Guest starring Norman Fell as Ida's doctor and John Ritter as Brenda's boyfriend.
22	22	"Windows by Rhoda"	Robert Moore	Charlotte Brown	February 10, 1975	4172
Rhoda has a lot of work on her hands when she starts a window-dressing business.
23	23	"A Nice Warm Rut"	Robert Moore	Marilyn Suzanne Miller	February 24, 1975	4173
Rhoda encourages Brenda to make some changes in her rather dull life.
24	24	"Ida the Elf"	Robert Moore	Charlotte Brown	March 3, 1975	4174
Ida worries that Rhoda will lose Joe if more housework isn't done.
25	25	"Along Comes Mary"	Robert Moore	Charlotte Brown and Coleman Mitchell & Geoffrey Neigher	March 10, 1975	4175
Mary Richards (Mary Tyler Moore) pays a poorly timed surprise visit to the Gerards.

=== Season 2 (1975–1976) ===
- Season 2 of Rhoda consisted of 24 half-hour episodes.
- With Rhoda in its new time slot on CBS, the show moved to Monday nights at 8:00 p.m.
- The opening credits have changed to feature clips from Season 1 episodes, intercut with Rhoda in many different activities around New York City.

No. overall	No. in season	Title	Directed by	Written by	Original release date	Prod. code
26	1	"Kiss Your Epaulets Goodbye"	Robert Moore	Michael Leeson	September 8, 1975	5152
The Gerards' apartment is burglarized when Carlton lets strangers in the building. Note: Ruth Gordon guest stars as Carlton's mother.
27	2	"Rhoda Meets the Ex-Wife"	Robert Moore	Charlotte Brown	September 15, 1975	5155
Rhoda meets Joe's ex-wife (Joan Van Ark) for the first time.
28	3	"Ida's Doctor"	Robert Moore	Coleman Mitchell and Geoffrey Neigher	September 22, 1975	5156
Ida falls in love with her doctor.
29	4	"Mucho, Macho"	Robert Moore	Coleman Mitchell and Geoffrey Neigher	September 29, 1975	5151
Joe takes on a lecher at the Gerards' anniversary dinner.
30	5	"The Party"	Robert Moore	Charlotte Brown	October 6, 1975	5159
Rhoda's party plans fall through when Brenda's date shows up with an accordion.
31	6	"Brenda's Unemployment"	Howard Storm	Pamela Herbert Chais	October 13, 1975	5158
Brenda is now unemployed. After going on countless interviews, Brenda gives up and gives in to her depression. Note: This episode was aired out of sequence.
32	7	"With Friends Like These"	Robert Moore	Sue Grafton	October 20, 1975	5157
Brenda quits her job after she is passed over for a promotion. Note: This is the last episode to be directed by Robert Moore before his death in 1984. This episode was aired out of sequence. It should have aired before "Brenda's Unemployment.
33	8	"Somebody Down There Likes Him"	Howard Storm	Pat Nardo and Gloria Banta	October 27, 1975	5154
Brenda's sexy new roommate has a crush on Joe. Note: This is the first episode to be directed by Howard Storm.
34	9	"Call Me Grandma"	Howard Storm	Charlotte Brown	November 3, 1975	5162
Ida wants to find a husband for rebellious Brenda.
35	10	"Myrna's Story"	Martin Cohan	Linda Bloodworth	November 10, 1975	5153
Rhoda's partner Myrna creates a unique way of acquiring new accounts.
36	11	"Love Songs of J. Nicholas Lobo"	Joan Darling	Coleman Mitchell and Geoffrey Neigher	November 17, 1975	5168
Brenda panics when her boyfriend Nick decides to move.
37	12	"Friends and Mothers"	Bob Claver	Pat Nardo and Gloria Banta	November 24, 1975	5160
Rhoda's friendship with a new neighbor makes Ida jealous. Note: Vivian Vance guest stars.
38	13	"A Night with the Girls"	Tony Mordente	Charlotte Brown	December 1, 1975	5165
Rhoda's night out with her friends falls apart when Myna becomes flirtatious.
39	14	"Bump in the Night"	Bob Claver	Seth Freeman	December 8, 1975	5167
Rhoda becomes paranoid when Joe leaves town on a fishing trip.
40	15	"If You Don't Tell Her, I Will"	Howard Storm	Bruce Kane	December 29, 1975	5164
Brenda's roommate takes in an insufferable house guest.
41	16	"Rhoda's Sellout"	Martin Cohan	Coleman Mitchell and Geoffrey Neigher	January 5, 1976	5163
Rhoda is forced to fulfill the demands of a surly shop owner to keep an account.
42	17	"Attack on Mr. Right"	Harvey Miller	Pat Nardo and Gloria Banta	January 12, 1976	5166
Rhoda teaches Brenda about seducing men.
43	18	"If You Want to Shoot the Rapids You Have to Get Wet"	Howard Storm	Charlotte Brown	January 19, 1976	5172
Rhoda's friend Susie is having marital problems.
44	19	"The Return of Billy Glass"	Howard Storm	Coleman Mitchell and Geoffrey Neigher	January 26, 1976	5171
An old friend of Martin's is still attracted to Ida.
45	20	"A Federal Case"	Tony Mordente	Pat Nardo and Gloria Banta	February 2, 1976	5173
Brenda gives a young FBI agent permission to use her apartment for a routine surveillance check.
46	21	"The Marty Morgan Story"	Doug Rogers	Charlotte Brown	February 9, 1976	5169
Ida thinks her husband is having an affair.
47	22	"Let's Call it Love"	Tony Mordente	Coleman Mitchell and Geoffrey Neigher	February 16, 1976	5174
Rhoda and Joe take time off from their jobs to be together.
48	23	"It's Not My Fault, Is It?"	Tony Mordente	Earl Pomerantz	February 23, 1976	5170
Lenny goes into a deep depression when Brenda turns him down again.
49	24	"Don't Give Up the Office"	Tony Mordente	Bud Wiser	March 1, 1976	5161
Rhoda feels blue over her failing business.

=== Season 3 (1976–1977) ===
- Season 3 of Rhoda consisted of 24 half-hour episodes.
- With Rhoda still on Monday nights at 8:00 p.m., the show moved to CBS on Sunday nights in the 8:00 p.m. time slot.
- The opening credits have changed to show the title's name over a shot of Rhoda in New York City, intercut with clips from many episodes of Seasons 1–3.
- This is the last season to feature David Groh as Joe Gerard before leaving the show to star in a short-lived CBS series Another Day in 1978.
- Ron Silver joins the cast as Gary Levy, while Ray Buktenica joins the cast as Benny Goodwin.

No. overall	No. in season	Title	Directed by	Written by	Original release date	Prod. code
50	1	"The Separation"	Jay Sandrich	Charlotte Brown	September 20, 1976	6151
Joe tells Rhoda that he isn't happy with their marriage and wants to separate.
51	2	"Together Again for the First Time"	Tony Mordente	Coleman Mitchell and Geoffrey Neigher	September 27, 1976	6152
Rhoda, now separated from Joe, visits his new apartment.
52	3	"No Big Deal"	Tony Mordente	Pat Nardo and Gloria Banta	October 4, 1976	6153
Rhoda and her neighbor switch apartments. Note: First appearance of Gary Levy (Ron Silver).
53	4	"I Won't Dance"	Doug Rogers	Charlotte Brown	October 11, 1976	6155
Rhoda and Brenda spend a weekend at a singles' resort. Note: First appearance of Sally Gallagher (Anne Meara).
54	5	"H-e-e-e-r-e's Johnny"	Doug Rogers	Coleman Mitchell and Geoffrey Neigher	October 18, 1976	6157
Nick Lobo arranges a blind date for Rhoda, Las Vegas lounge singer Johnny Venture (Michael DeLano)
55	6	"Two Little Words - Marriage Counselor"	Tony Mordente	Charlotte Brown	October 25, 1976	6158
Rhoda talks Joe into attending a marriage-counseling session.
56	7	"An Elephant Never Forgets"	Tony Mordente	Michael Leeson	November 1, 1976	6160
Brenda has become too thin for her weight-loss club.
57	8	"Rhoda Questions Her Life and Flies to Paris"	Asaad Kelada	Michael Leeson	November 8, 1976	6154
Rhoda thinks she's become ho-hum.
58	9	"Meet the Levys"	Doug Rogers	Charlotte Brown	November 15, 1976	6162
Gary talks Rhoda into pretending she's his girlfriend to please his parents.
59	10	"Man of the Year"	Tony Mordente	Pat Nardo and Gloria Banta	November 29, 1976	6156
Rhoda has another bad encounter with Joe's best friend.
60	11	"You Deserve a Break Today"	Alan Myerson	Pat Nardo and Gloria Banta	December 13, 1976	6163
Brenda has a brief engagement with the owner of three McDonald's franchises.
61	12	"A Touch of Classy"	Asaad Kelada	Coleman Mitchell and Geoffrey Neigher	December 20, 1976	6161
Sally's ex-husband is remarrying and would like her to accept a reduction in their alimony.
62	13	"Guess Who I Saw Today"	Doug Rogers	Burt Prelutsky	December 27, 1976	6159
Rhoda sees Joe with another woman.
63	14	"What Are You Doing New Year's Eve?"	Tony Mordente	Pat Nardo and Gloria Banta	January 3, 1977	6165
Rhoda throws a wild New Year's Eve party. Note: Last appearance of Sally Gallagher (Anne Meara).
64	15	"Love for Sale"	Tony Mordente	Coleman Mitchell and Geoffrey Neigher	January 10, 1977	6167
Rhoda and Brenda help Gary with his mod clothing business, only for Brenda to fall in love with him.
65	16	"A Night in the Emergency Room"	Tony Mordente	Coleman Mitchell and Geoffrey Neigher	January 16, 1977	6166
After Rhoda causes Nick Lobo to break up with Brenda, Nick accidentally breaks Rhoda's toe.
66	17	"Somebody Has to Say They're Sorry"	Tony Mordente	Martin Rips and Joseph Staretski	January 23, 1977	6168
Rhoda gets arrested for soliciting. Note: First appearance of Benny Goodwin (Ray Buktenica).
67	18	"The Ultimatum"	Tony Mordente	Charlotte Brown	January 30, 1977	6164
Rhoda gives Joe an ultimatum: either he comes back or she dates other men. Note: Last appearances of Joe Gerard (David Groh) and Mary Richards (Mary Tyler Moore).
68	19	"Rhoda's Mystery Man"	Tony Mordente	Coleman Mitchell and Geoffrey Neigher	February 6, 1977	6172
A mysterious suitor sends Rhoda various gifts.
69	20	"Nick Lobo, Superstar"	Tony Mordente	Charlotte Brown	February 13, 1977	6170
Nick Lobo is determined to gain superstar status so he won't have to go into his father's garbage-collecting business.
70	21	"Nose Job"	Tony Mordente	Charlotte Brown	February 20, 1977	6171
Rhoda is appalled by the fact Brenda is actually considering a nose job.
71	22	"The Second Time Around"	Asaad Kelada	Pat Nardo and Gloria Banta	February 27, 1977	6169
Rhoda dates Brenda's boss.
72	23	"Pajama Party Bingo"	Bruce Chevillat	Ian Praiser and Varley Smith	March 6, 1977	6173
An all-night pajama party has Rhoda and Brenda playing a truth-type verbal game that uncovers jealousy between them.
73	24	"To Vegas With Love"	Tony Mordente	Coleman Mitchell and Geoffrey Neigher	March 13, 1977	6174
Rhoda flies to Las Vegas to see Johnny Venture.

=== Season 4 (1977–1978) ===
- Season 4 of Rhoda consisted of 24 half-hour episodes.
- The show still aired on CBS on Sunday nights at 8:00 p.m.
- Nancy Walker and Harold Gould returned to the series in this season, while Kenneth McMillan joined the cast as Jack Doyle.
- This is the last season to feature Gary Levy (Ron Silver) before leaving the show.
- The opening credits have changed to show Rhoda in many different activities around New York City (namely Rockefeller Center, the IND 57th Street Station, Park Avenue, Little Italy and Central Park) with her sister Brenda.
- The closing credits have changed to feature Rhoda walking out of the New York Public Library Main Branch, and walking down the sidewalk towards Fifth Avenue. This remained in use until the show's ending in 1978.

No. overall	No. in season	Title	Directed by	Written by	Original release date	Prod. code
74	1	"The Return of Ida"	Tony Mordente	Charlotte Brown	October 2, 1977	7160
Ida returns from a year-long cross-country trip to learn that Rhoda is officially divorced and Brenda is having trouble dealing with the state of her innocence.
75	2	"The Job"	James Burrows	Allan Katz and Don Reo	October 9, 1977	7159
After weeks of depression, Rhoda gets a job at a run-down costume-rental company. Note: First appearance of Jack Doyle (Kenneth McMillan).
76	3	"Lady's Choice"	Tony Mordente	Sy Rosen	October 16, 1977	7153
Brenda has two boyfriends competing for her attention - and both ask her out on the same night.
77	4	"One is a Number"	James Burrows	Charlotte Brown	October 23, 1977	7162
Rhoda has a hard time finding someone to go with her to the theater when she receives two tickets. Note: Anne Jackson guest stars as diner waitress Bea
78	5	"Ida Works Out"	Tony Mordente	Dennis Koenig and Larry Balmagia	October 30, 1977	7163
Ida works part-time at the Doyle Costume Company to afford her husband a waterbed for their anniversary.
79	6	"Rhoda Likes Mike"	Tony Mordente	Deborah Leschin	November 6, 1977	7158
Rhoda is introduced to a handsome customer (Judd Hirsch) who owns three successful restaurants.
80	7	"The Weekend"	Tony Mordente	Earl Pomerantz	November 13, 1977	7157
Rhoda plans to spend the weekend alone with Mike.
81	8	"Home Movies"	Tony Mordente	Allan Katz and Don Reo	December 4, 1977	7161
Dinner at the Morgensterns' does not go so well.
82	9	"Johnny's Solo Flight"	Tony Mordente	Dennis Koenig and Larry Balmagia	December 11, 1977	7155
Rhoda is forced to step in when Johnny's nightclub solo debut goes awry.
83	10	"Who's Shy?"	Asaad Kelada	Dennis Koenig and Larry Balmagia	December 25, 1977	7166
Rhoda talks Brenda into getting therapy to cure her shyness.
84	11	"Blind Date"	Asaad Kelada	Don Reo	January 8, 1978	7167
Ida has set Rhoda up on another blind date (David Landsberg).
85	12	"Ida Alone"	James Burrows	David Lloyd	January 14, 1978	7165
Rhoda and Brenda try to cheer up Ida, whose friends have died.
86	13	"All Work and No Play"	James Burrows	Deborah Leschin	January 22, 1978	7164
Rhoda's job at the costume company makes her neglect her family and friends.
87	14	"Happy Anniversary"	Asaad Kelada	Charlotte Brown	January 29, 1978	7169
Ida's hints of a forthcoming party lead everyone to believe there is no party.
88	15	"The Jack Story"	Asaad Kelada	Allan Katz	February 5, 1978	7168
Rhoda is asked to help her boss, whose old friend has arrived in New York.
89	16	"Rhoda Cheats"	Tony Mordente	Charlotte Brown	February 12, 1978	7172
Rhoda goes to night school with Brenda and gets accused of cheating.
90	17	"Gary and Ida"	Bruce Chevillat	David Lloyd	February 19, 1978	7170
Now that his parents are living Florida, Gary starts getting close to Ida.
91	18	"As Time Goes By"	Tony Mordente	Deborah Leschin	February 26, 1978	7171
Rhoda and Jack get locked in a bathroom while preparing a party to boost the costume company's business.
92	19	"Two's Company"	Tony Mordente	Don Reo	March 5, 1978	7173
Gary and Benny start a business together that puts a strain on their friendship. Note: First appearance of Tina Molinaro (Nancy Lane).
93	20	"Brenda and the Bank Girl"	Tony Mordente	Earl Pomerantz	March 12, 1978	7175
Brenda is a finalist in the running for First Security Bank Girl.
94	21	"So Long, Lucky"	Tony Mordente	Allan Katz	April 2, 1978	7174
Rhoda experiences bad luck after causing the death of a police officer Tony Rizzo's (Carmine Caridi) horse "Lucky". It gets worse when she visits the Officer Rizzo to give him a cat to keep him company. Rhoda accidentally let Rizzo's pet bird out a window. The bird comes back, but the cat eats it.
95	22	"Jack's Back"	Nancy Walker	Deborah Leschin	April 9, 1978	7176
Rhoda plays nurse for Jack after he injures his back at her apartment while reaching down to pick up a design. Note: Last appearance of Gary Levy (Ron Silver).
96	23	"Five for the Road: Part 1"	Tony Mordente	Charlotte Brown and Allan Katz & Don Reo	April 16, 1978	7177
Jack is depressed, as the anniversary date of his marriage to his late wife gets closer. Benny feels left out of Brenda's life, because her family's conversations are always about people and events before he met her. Meanwhile, Ida narrowly escapes an attempted mugging. Rhoda tries to cheer up Jack with a road trip, bringing along Brenda, Benny and Ida. When they go in search of the Quincy House, a restaurant Jack used to visit with his wife, he can't remember the exact directions to it. As Benny drives, everybody in the car starts arguing with each other. A raging rainstorm kicks up, and the car gets stuck in the mud.
97	24	"Five for the Road: Part 2"	Tony Mordente	Charlotte Brown and Allan Katz & Don Reo	April 23, 1978	7178
The gang is stuck in the mud, and get out to walk to seek shelter in what looks like an old haunted house. They find an old signing saying "Quincy House" dangling from the porch, leaving Jack disappointed that he will no longer be able to experience the delicious food there. Until the storm clears, they must make do with the snacks in Ida's handbag, and try not to get on each other's nerves. Ida is convinced the men will start yearning for a woman's body. The group shuns Brenda after she eats the only candy bar they have. The next morning, they find a box full of jars of canned peaches. A construction worker tells them they have to vacate, because they're getting ready to raze the house to make way for a road.

=== Season 5 (1978–1979) ===
- Season 5 of Rhoda consisted of 13 half-hour episodes.
- The show moved to Saturday nights at 8:00 p.m.
- The footage during the opening and closing credits remained the same as in Season 4, however, with a different arrangement of the theme song.
- Nancy Lane joined the cast for the show's final season, as Tina Molinaro.

No. overall	No. in season	Title	Directed by	Written by	Original release date	Prod. code
98	1	"Martin Doesn't Live Here Anymore"	Tony Mordente	Charlotte Brown	September 23, 1978	8152
Rhoda and Brenda are dismayed that Martin is unable to attend his 60th birthday party, then discover that he moved out over two months ago.
99	2	"In Search of Martin"	Tony Mordente	Aubrey Tadman and Garry Ferrier	September 30, 1978	8155
Rhoda, Brenda and Benny go to Florida to find Martin.
100	3	"Rhoda vs. Ida"	Tony Mordente	Bob Ellison	October 7, 1978	8151
Rhoda does not approve of her mother dating her allergist Dr. Murray Burger (Charles Siebert), because he is much younger than Ida. Note: The 100th episode of Rhoda airs.
101	4	"Brenda Gets Engaged"	Tony Mordente	David Lloyd	October 14, 1978	8156
Brenda gets engaged to Benny, but Ida disapproves of their union, due to Martin's move to Florida having soured Ida on the institution of marriage.
102	5	"Meet the Goodwins"	Tony Mordente	Charlotte Brown	October 21, 1978	8153
At Brenda's insistence, Rhoda accompanies her to meet Brenda's future in-laws, then Rhoda ends up on a harrowing date with Benny's older brother Earl (George Wyner).
103	6	"Ida's Roommate"	Tony Mordente	David Lloyd	October 28, 1978	8157
In her search for a roommate, Ida gets more than she expects when she chooses a couple to share her apartment.
104	7	"Martin Comes Home"	Tony Mordente	Charlotte Brown	November 11, 1978	8159
Martin returns from Florida hoping to reconcile with Ida, but she wants a second courtship to forgive him for leaving her.
105	8	"Jack's New Image"	Nancy Walker	Aubrey Tadman and Garry Ferrier	December 2, 1978	8158
Rhoda talks Jack into acquiring new clothes for his new physique, but they both learn something about inner beauty.
106	9	"The Total Brenda"	Nancy Walker	Emily Purdum Marshall	December 9, 1978	8160
Brenda caters to Benny's every whim just to cheer him up.
107	10	"The Date in the Iron Mask"	Nancy Walker	Bob Ellison	Not aired on CBS	8154
Rhoda's date gets his head stuck in a ridiculous-looking mask just before an awards dinner.
108	11	"Martin Swallows His Heart"	Tony Mordente	Bob Ellison	Not aired on CBS	8161
Martin buys a heart-shaped gold charm for Ida that he proceeds to swallow.
109	12	"Earl's Helping Hand"	Charlotte Brown	Emily Purdum Marshall	Not aired on CBS	8163
Benny's brother Earl offers to lend Jack the $5,000 needed to get the costume company out of debt, but only to spend a week with Rhoda on the job.
110	13	"Brenda Runs Away"	Tony Mordente	David Lloyd	Not aired on CBS	8164
Brenda runs away when it seems that everyone is trying to run her life.
