= A Change in the Wind =

A Change in the Wind may refer to:

- The Irish Whiskey Rebellion, also known as A Change in The Wind, a 1972 crime drama
- A Change in the Wind (1949 film), a French comedy film
