= MTM Enterprises =

American independent production company (1969–1998)

MTM Enterprises, Inc.
- Logo with Mimsie the Cat, the company's mascot
- Type: Subsidiary
- Industry: Television and film production
- Founded: 1969; 57 years ago
- Founders: Mary Tyler Moore; Grant Tinker
- Defunct: May 19, 1998; 28 years ago
- Fate: Acquired by News Corporation and folded into 20th Century Fox Television, which became 20th Television two decades later
- Successor: 20th Television
- Parent: TVS Entertainment (Television South plc) (1988–1993); International Family Entertainment (1993–1997); News Corporation (1997–1998)
- Divisions: MTM Television Distribution; MTM International; MTM Home Video; MTM Records

MTM Enterprises, Inc. (also known as MTM Productions, Inc.) was an American independent production company established in 1969 by Mary Tyler Moore and her then-husband Grant Tinker to produce The Mary Tyler Moore Show for CBS. The name for the production company was drawn from Moore's initials.

With MTM, Moore would become one of the first women to own a television production company. MTM became very successful, producing a number of successful television programs during the 1970s and 1980s. Since 2019, The Walt Disney Company has owned all of the company's programs through its subsidiary 20th Television.

== History ==
In 1969, MTM Enterprises was organized by both Mary Tyler Moore and Grant Tinker, and hired James L. Brooks and Allan Burns to create her sitcom, The Mary Tyler Moore Show. Brooks' show Room 222 has even been credited by the Television Academy Foundation for breaking the "new narrative ground" which developed MTM Enterprises' "major sitcom factories of the 1970s."

In 1971, co-founder Grant Tinker was forced to quit 20th Century Fox Television due to conflicts with how to run MTM, in order to maintain a full-time job at the company.

In 1976, MTM teamed up with Metromedia Producers Corporation to start a variety show, a first for first-run syndication. Earlier that year, the company had hired Bud Rifkin to launch a syndicated division.

In 1977, Ed. Weinberger, James L. Brooks, David Davis, Allan Burns, and Stan Daniels left MTM Enterprises for Paramount Pictures and started the John Charles Walters Company.

Tinker oversaw MTM's operation until leaving the company.

In 1981, Tinker became the chairman of NBC. Lawyers backing NBC's then-owner RCA convinced Tinker to sell his remaining shares of MTM. Moore and Arthur Price, her business manager and company vice president, bought Tinker's shares; Price subsequently was elevated to president. Tinker later regretted leaving MTM, believing that the company started to decline without him.

Most of MTM's programs aired on CBS. For many years, MTM and CBS co-owned the CBS Studio Center in Studio City California, where a majority of their programs were filmed and videotaped.

In 1986, MTM launched its own syndicated arm MTM Television Distribution, to handle off-net syndication of the MTM shows, and subsequently courted to continue its relations with syndicator Jim Victory to sell off-network rights to MTM's shows like Hill Street Blues and WKRP in Cincinnati, all the way up until the late 1980s as part of a contract settlement. In 1988, MTM was sold to UK broadcaster and independent station for the South and South East of England TVS Entertainment for $320 million. A year afterwards, MTM Television Distribution began producing its own programming for the first-run syndication market.

MTM performed poorly after TVS acquired it. The latter put the former up for sale, but could not find a buyer willing to pay more than $70 million. After TVS lost its franchise to broadcast on the ITV network to Meridian Broadcasting, a number of American companies (and to a lesser extent, Meridian) were interested in acquiring MTM, with Pat Robertson's International Family Entertainment making the first offer. A small number of shareholders, including Julian Tregar, rejected the offer from IFE. In November, TCW Capital made a bid, but withdrew it a few weeks later after reviewing the accounts of TVS. IFE increased its offer to £45.3 million, but continued to be opposed by Julian Tregar, who blocked the deal on technical grounds, alleging that the offer was too low. IFE finally increased the offer to appease the remaining shareholders, and on January 23, 1993, their offer of £56.5 million was finally accepted. The deal went into effect on February 1, 1993 (the month after Meridian began its first broadcast).

In 1995, Michael Ogiens, formerly running CBS, as well as his production company Ogiens/Kane Company, joined MTM to serve as president of the company in hopes that MTM would be restored to its independent production glory. The following year, Josh Kane, fellow partner of the Ogiens/Kane Company joined MTM as vice president for the East Coast offices. In 1997, MTM hit layoffs at the syndication unit after the cancellation of the show The Cape.

In 1997, International Family Entertainment was sold to News Corporation, and folded into its subsidiary Fox Kids Worldwide, eventually renamed to Fox Family Worldwide (a joint venture between Fox and Saban Entertainment). MTM's library assets however, were transferred over to 20th Television who retained them, even after Fox Family Worldwide was sold to The Walt Disney Company in 2001. Until then, The Pretender and Good News were the last surviving shows to be produced by MTM, as 20th Century Fox Television inherited both shows in 1997 (when News Corporation purchased MTM) and 1998 (when MTM ceased operations) respectively. MTM's library became property of Disney following its acquisition of 20th Century Fox in 2019. Disney holds the rights of most of MTM's shows.

MTM Enterprises also included a record label, MTM Records — distributed by Capitol Records — which was in existence from 1984 to 1988.

== Filmography ==
=== Television series ===
Title	Genre	First air date	Last air date	Number of Seasons	Network	Co-production company(s)	Note(s)
The Mary Tyler Moore Show	Sitcom	September 19, 1970	March 19, 1977	7	CBS		
The Bob Newhart Show	Sitcom	September 16, 1972	April 1, 1978	6	CBS		
Rhoda	Sitcom	September 9, 1974	December 9, 1978	5	CBS		First spin-off of The Mary Tyler Moore Show
The Texas Wheelers	Sitcom	September 12, 1974	July 24, 1975	1	ABC		
Paul Sand in Friends and Lovers	Sitcom	September 14, 1974	December 7, 1974	1	CBS		
The Bob Crane Show	Sitcom	March 6, 1975	June 12, 1975	1	NBC		
Doc	Sitcom	August 16, 1975	October 30, 1976	2	CBS		
Phyllis	Sitcom	September 8, 1975	March 13, 1977	2	CBS		Second spin-off of The Mary Tyler Moore Show
Three for the Road	Adventure	September 14, 1975	November 30, 1975	1	CBS		
The Lorenzo & Henrietta Music Show	Musical-variety	September 13, 1976	October 11, 1976	1	Syndicated		
The Tony Randall Show	Sitcom	September 23, 1976	March 25, 1978	2	ABC (Season 1); CBS (Season 2)		
The Betty White Show	Sitcom	September 12, 1977	January 2, 1978	1	CBS		
Lou Grant	Journalism drama	September 20, 1977	September 13, 1982	5	CBS		Third spin-off of The Mary Tyler Moore Show
We've Got Each Other	Sitcom	October 1, 1977	January 14, 1978	1	CBS		
WKRP in Cincinnati	Sitcom	September 18, 1978	April 21, 1982	4	CBS		
Mary	Variety	September 24, 1978	October 8, 1978	1	CBS		
The White Shadow	Sports drama	November 27, 1978	March 16, 1981	3	CBS		
The Mary Tyler Moore Hour	Variety	March 4, 1979	May 13, 1979	1	CBS		
The Last Resort	Sitcom	September 19, 1979	March 17, 1980	1	CBS		
Paris	Police drama	September 29, 1979	January 15, 1980	1	CBS		
Hill Street Blues	Police drama	January 15, 1981	May 12, 1987	7	NBC		
Remington Steele	Private eye drama	October 1, 1982	February 17, 1987	5	NBC		
Newhart	Sitcom	October 25, 1982	May 21, 1990	8	CBS		
St. Elsewhere	Medical drama	October 26, 1982	May 25, 1988	6	NBC		
Bay City Blues	Sports drama	October 25, 1983	November 15, 1983	1	NBC		
The Duck Factory	Sitcom	April 12, 1984	July 11, 1984	1	NBC		
Mary	Sitcom	December 11, 1985	April 8, 1986	1	CBS		
Fresno	Comedy	November 16, 1986	November 20, 1986	1	CBS		miniseries
The Popcorn Kid	Sitcom	March 23, 1987	April 24, 1987	1	CBS		
Beverly Hills Buntz	Sitcom	November 5, 1987	April 22, 1988	1	NBC		Spin-off of Hill Street Blues
Eisenhower and Lutz	Sitcom	March 14, 1988	June 20, 1988	1	CBS		
Annie McGuire	Sitcom	October 26, 1988	December 28, 1988	1	CBS		
Tattingers	Dramedy	October 26, 1988	April 26, 1989	1	NBC		
FM	Sitcom	August 17, 1989	June 28, 1990	1	NBC		
Rescue 911	Reality	September 5, 1989	August 27, 1996	8	CBS	Arnold Shapiro Productions	American distribution only, produced by CBS Entertainment Productions
America's Funniest Home Videos	Clip	November 26, 1989	Present	32	ABC		distribution for pre-2001 episodes only; currently distributed by sister company Disney Entertainment Distribution
City	Sitcom	January 29, 1990	June 8, 1990	1	CBS	CBS Entertainment Productions	(Note: No longer distributed by 20th Television)
Capital News	Journalism drama	April 9, 1990	April 30, 1990	1	ABC		
The Trials of Rosie O'Neill	Legal drama	September 17, 1990	May 30, 1992	2	CBS	The Rosenzweig Company	
Evening Shade	Sitcom	September 21, 1990	May 23, 1994	4	CBS	CBS Entertainment Productions, Bloodworth-Thomason Mozark Productions and Burt Reynolds Productions	distributed outside of American television by Paramount Global Content Distribution
You Take the Kids	Sitcom	December 15, 1990	January 12, 1991	1	CBS	CBS Entertainment Productions and Paul Haggis Productions	
The New WKRP in Cincinnati	Sitcom	September 14, 1991	May 22, 1993	2	Syndicated		
The Amazing Live Sea Monkeys	Sitcom	September 19, 1992	November 28, 1992	1	CBS	Terry's Creations and Some Assembly Required Productions	
Graham Kerr's Kitchen	Cooking	September 30, 1992	March 19, 1995	3	Syndicated	West 175th Enterprises	distribution only
Dr. Quinn, Medicine Woman	Western	January 1, 1993	May 16, 1998	6	CBS	The Sullivan Company	American TV distribution only; produced by CBS Productions
Xuxa	Educational	September 13, 1993	December 31, 1993	1	Syndicated	Lynch Entertainment	
Christy	Drama	April 3, 1994	August 2, 1995	2	CBS	The Rosenzweig Company	
Snowy River: The McGregor Saga	Adventure	September 23, 1994	May 24, 1998	4	The Family Channel		aired on Nine Network in Australia
Boogies Diner	Sitcom	September 17, 1994	January 1, 1995	1	Syndicated	Franklin/Waterman and King Street Entertainment	
Family Challenge	Game show	October 2, 1995	September 7, 1997	2	The Family Channel	Woody Fraser Enterprises and Maple Palm Productions	
Sparks	Sitcom	August 26, 1996	March 2, 1998	2	UPN	The Weinberger Company	
The Cape	Adventure	September 9, 1996	May 19, 1997	1	Syndicated	Zaloom-Mayfield Productions	
The Pretender	Science fiction	September 19, 1996	May 13, 2000	4	NBC	NBC Studios	season 1 only; distributed outside the United States by NBCUniversal Syndication Studios
Bailey Kipper's P.O.V.	Sitcom	September 14, 1996	December 14, 1996	1	CBS	Kipper Productions and Victoria Productions	
Shopping Spree	Game show	September 30, 1996	December 26, 1997	2	The Family Channel	Jay Wolpert Enterprises	
Wait 'Til You Have Kids	Game show	September 30, 1996	January 31, 1997	1	The Family Channel	Jay Wolpert Enterprises	
It Takes Two	Game show	March 10, 1997	May 30, 1997	1	The Family Channel	Mark Phillips Philms & Telephision	
Good News	Sitcom	August 25, 1997	May 19, 1998	1	UPN	The Weinberger Company	

=== Television specials ===
Title	Genre	Original air date	Network	Co-production company(s)	Note(s)
Carlton Your Doorman	Animated comedy	May 21, 1980	CBS	Murakami-Wolf-Swenson	Pilot for proposed spin-off of Rhoda
Oh, No! Not THEM!	Sitcom	1990 (cancelled)	FOX	N/A	Pilot for American version of The Young Ones. Originally set to air in 1990, but ultimately went unreleased until November 2025.
Cyborg 009	Anime	1993 (cancelled)	Syndication	Toei Animation Inc.	Pilot for English version of Cyborg 009. Originally set to air in 1993, but ultimately went unreleased until November 2025.
My Hero	Reality	1995 (cancelled)	The Family Channel	CINAR	Pilot for television version of The My Hero Project. Originally set to air in 1995, but ultimately went unreleased until June 2026.

=== Film ===
Title	Genre	Release date	Distributed
A Little Sex	Comedy	April 2, 1982	Universal Pictures
Just Between Friends	Drama	March 21, 1986	Orion Pictures
Clara's Heart	Drama	October 7, 1988	Warner Brothers

== Logo ==
The MTM Enterprises logo, which was also used by MTM Records, was conceived as a parody of the Metro-Goldwyn-Mayer (MGM) roaring lion trademark. During an early production meeting for The Mary Tyler Moore Show, producer Allan Burns noted the similarity between the initials MTM and MGM, suggesting that the fledgling company use a meowing orange kitten instead of a roaring lion. The production team obtained a ginger tabby cat kitten, named Mimsie, from a local animal shelter. Because Mimsie would not meow on cue during filming, crew members placed a drop of milk on her paw, filmed her licking it off, and ran the footage in reverse with a dubbed meow sound effect. Following the shoot, Mimsie was adopted by an MTM staff member and lived in the San Fernando Valley until her death in 1988 at the age of 20.
