= Lisa Lindgren =

Lisa Lindgren may refer to:

- Lisa Lindgren (Swedish actress)
- Lisa Lindgren (American actress)
