= Carlton Your Doorman =

1980 American television pilot

- Based on: "Carlton, the Doorman" created by James L. Brooks; Allan Burns; David Davis; Lorenzo Music
- Written by: Lorenzo Music; Barton Dean
- Directed by: Charles Swenson; Fred Wolf
- Voices of: Lorenzo Music; Jack Somack; Lucille Meredith; Lurene Tuttle
- Music by: Stephen Cohn
- Country of origin: United States
- Original language: English
- No. of episodes: 1

Production
- Producers: Lorenzo Music; Barton Dean
- Running time: 23 minutes
- Production companies: Murakami-Wolf-Swenson; MTM Enterprises

Original release
- Network: CBS
- Release: May 21, 1980

Related
- Rhoda

Carlton Your Doorman is a 1980 American television pilot for an animated spin-off of the live-action sitcom Rhoda (1974–1978) that was never picked up as a series. It originally aired as a "CBS Special Presentation" on May 21, 1980, and has never been rebroadcast.

== Synopsis ==
Carlton is a New York City doorman and a misfit who seeks to better himself and his position in society. In the pilot episode, Carlton seeks a replacement for his boss's wife's dog, Punkin, who died while in his care. He tries everything to replace the dog so his boss does not find out.

It was revealed in this episode that Carlton is a relatively young man, with shoulder-length blond hair and mustache. He also has a gray cat named Ringo.

== Production ==
The episode relates the adventures of Carlton, the Doorman (voiced by Lorenzo Music), the previously off-screen character from Rhoda who was heard via the intercom but almost never seen (except only his arm would occasionally appear from doors and he was once shown dancing while wearing a gorilla mask). It was produced by MTM Enterprises and was the only animated production from MTM, although The Duck Factory – a sitcom set in an animation production company – included cartoon segments, and the closing credits of many MTM series included animated clothing and accessories superimposed on Mimsie the Cat.

It is also one of the last animated programs to use a laugh track, which was a common practice in the 1960s and 1970s.

== Voice cast ==
- Lorenzo Music as Carlton, the Doorman
- Jack Somack as Charles Shaftman, Carlton's boss
- Lucille Meredith as Mrs. Shaftman, Charles' wife
- Lurene Tuttle as Carlton's mother
- Kay Cole as Darlene, Carlton's girlfriend

== Home media ==
Shout! Factory released this episode as a bonus feature on Rhoda – Season Five: The Final Season DVD set on October 17, 2017.

== Accolades ==
Primetime Emmy Awards

- 1980: Primetime Emmy Award for Outstanding Animated Program – Carlton Your Doorman
