= George Kirgo =

American novelist (1926–2004)

- George Kirgo, as photographed by Elliott Erwitt, on the cover of his second book, published at the height of the author's early sixties celebrity.
- Born: George Blumenthal; March 26, 1926; Hartford, Connecticut, U.S.
- Died: August 22, 2004 (aged 78); Santa Monica, California, U.S.
- Occupations: Screenwriter, author
- Years active: 1954–2001

George Kirgo (born George Blumenthal; March 26, 1926 – August 22, 2004) was an American screenwriter, author and humorist.

== Early life ==
Kirgo was born George Blumenthal in Hartford, Connecticut, the middle child of three born to Russian immigrants Isadore and Anna Blumenthal. While attending Hartford Public High School, he worked as a movie usher and as a reporter for The Hartford Times; graduating in 1943, he was dubbed "the Orson Welles of HPHS" by his high school yearbook.

In April 1944, while attending Wesleyan University, Blumenthal enlisted in the U.S. Army Reserve, eventually serving in the USAAF during the final few months of World War II, in the South Pacific and Japan. It was sometime after his return, but before his brief emergence in the early 1950s as a small book seller and publisher, that Blumenthal became George Kirgo, officially adopting his erstwhile nickname.

== Career ==
A screenwriter since 1954, Kirgo's many credits encompass a wide variety of TV series, including Kraft Suspense Theatre, The New People, Run for Your Life, Room 222, Mary Tyler Moore, My Mother the Car, and The Feather and Father Gang. He scripted or co-scripted feature films such as Red Line 7000, Spinout, Don't Make Waves, and Voices as well as TV movies such as Get Christie Love!, The Man in the Santa Claus Suit, and the American Playhouse production My Palikari. He was a producer for the short-lived 1978 situation comedy Another Day.

Kirgo also appeared onscreen on occasion, primarily in the early 1960s, with a flurry of talk and game show appearances between 1959 and 1964. The first of these came shortly after the publication of his first book, the comic novel Hercules, the Big Greek Story. Some glowing notices notwithstanding, not much notice was paid; nonetheless, the book impressed Tonight Show host Jack Paar sufficiently to secure Kirgo a guest spot; (Note: Well before Paar's revelation, an equally notable head had been turned. In the summer of 1958, theatrical producer David Merrick discerned in Kirgo's under-exposed Hollywood satire the seeds of a hit Broadway musical. News reports notwithstanding, nothing seems to have come of these plans.) the ensuing appearance sufficed to earn the fledgling novelist several such invitations over the next two seasons. During this period, Kirgo published his second book, How to Write Ten Different Best Sellers Now In Your Spare Time and Become the First Author on Your Block Unless There's an Author Already Living on Your Block in Which Case You'll Become the Second Author on Your Block and That's OK, too, and Other Stories. similarly satirical in nature, though this time non-fiction. On January 2, 1962, Kirgo made his daytime TV debut as one of the regular panelists, with Dennis James, on Monty Hall's game show Your First Impression.

By mid-1964, the show was cancelled, but writing assignments, for both big screen and small, quickly filled the void. From that point on, for more than two decades, Kirgo's screen appearances were confined to bit roles in a handful of TV shows and one feature film, The Best Man, a political drama scripted by Gore Vidal, in which Kirgo's character interacts, albeit briefly, with the president of the United States, portrayed by Henry Fonda. (Note: At least in the case of The Best Man, Kirgo appears to have improvised his own dialogue.) It would be the early 1980s before Kirgo's writing workload lessened, and it was not until 1987 that he was briefly resurrected as an on-air personality, the TV/movie critic for The Morning Program, CBS's ill-fated alternative to ABC's Good Morning America and NBC's Today.

From 1987 to 1991, Kirgo was president of the Writers Guild of America, West, most notably during the contentious 150-day-long strike over compensation from home video sales, which took place between March and August 1988. He also served as vice president of the Writers Guild Foundation between 1995 and 2001. In addition, Kirgo helped script the WGAW's Annual Awards show from 1979 through 1998, and from 1991 through 2001, he produced it.

In 1988, Kirgo received PEN Center USA's president's award, and, in 2001, the WGAW's Morgan Cox Award, for his years of service to the Guild. Kirgo was also a founding member of the National Film Preservation Board of the Library of Congress.

== Death ==
In 2004, following a long illness, Kirgo died at age 78, having lost his wife of 38 years (and mother of his three children), Terry Newell, nearly two decades earlier. He was survived by his second wife, Angela Wales, then director of the Writers Guild Foundation (previously executive director of the Australian Writers Guild), and three children from his first marriage – screenwriters/producers Dinah Kirgo and Julie Kirgo, and musician-songwriter Nick Kirgo. In addition, Kirgo left behind stepson Alec Perrin, his sister Rita Lapp, four grandchildren, niece Tyne Daly, and nephew Tim Daly.
