= Charlotte Brown (producer) =

American screenwriter and producer

- Born: Charlotte Sue Brown; October 20, 1943 (age 81); Cleveland, Ohio U.S.
- Occupation(s): Television producer, writer and director
- Years active: 1972–1998
- Known for: Rhoda

Charlotte Sue Brown (born October 20, 1943) is an American television producer, writer, director, and showrunner who in 1977 was acclaimed to have become the first woman showrunner of a primetime network television series for her work on The Mary Tyler Moore Show spin-off Rhoda. However, Gertrude Berg, who created The Goldbergs, earned that title almost two decades earlier.

== Early life and education ==
Brown was born in Cleveland, Ohio, to Jewish parents. Her family moved to Los Angeles when she was young. She grew up in the Fairfax and Pico-Robertson neighborhoods in Los Angeles, California, where her father was a musician and her mother worked in a clerical position at The May Company.

Brown graduated from UCLA with a B.A. in English.

== Career ==
Brown's early career began first as a high school teacher,. and then as a junior copywriter at an advertising agency. She wanted to get into the TV industry and managed to meet James L. Brooks via her dentist, eventually visiting the set of early episode tapings of The Mary Tyler Moore Show. She gave Brooks a spec script, and was mentored by Brooks, who hired her as a freelance writer.

Brown worked on many of Grant Tinker['s MTM Enterprises shows run by writers James L. Brooks and Allan Burns during the early 1970s – shows like The Mary Tyler Moore Show, The Partridge Family, Love, American Style and The Bob Newhart Show She was part of a universe of women writers that included Pat Nardo, Gail Parent, Susan Silver, and Treva Silverman.

In the late 1960s and early 1970s, it was unusual to find a woman inside the writers' room of a primetime network television show other than secretaries and personal assistants. A notable exception was Madelyn Pugh, who wrote for the I Love Lucy series. After the success of Treva Silverman, some showrunners began to actively recruit women writers. One of them was James L. Brooks who hired Brown to write an episode of The Mary Tyler Moore Show. Assignments soon followed on The Sandy Duncan Show, The Partridge Family, and The Bob Newhart Show. For many of the series in which she worked, Brown was often the first woman writer that had ever been hired by that particular producer.

When Brooks created Rhoda, a spin-off of The Mary Tyler Moore Show, Brown was hired as a staff writer. She quickly rose up the ranks, becoming the program's executive producer in 1977. As a result, Brown became one of the first female showrunners in primetime television history.

Brown said that she based the character of Ida Morgenstern, Rhoda's mother, portrayed by actor Nancy Walker, on her own mother. Rhoda ran for 5 seasons before it was canceled.

Brown went on to direct and write. She created the 1992 tv series, The Powers That Be with Marta Kauffman and David Crane.

== Personal life ==
In the early 1980s, Brown adopted a daughter.

== Awards and recognition ==
- 1975: Writers Guild of America Award, Episodic Comedy for "Parents' Day" episode of Rhoda (nomination)
- 1975: Ladies’ Home Journal, Women of the Year Award

== Filmography ==
- 1972: The Mary Tyler Moore Show (TV series) – writer
- 1972: The Doris Day Show (TV series) – writer
- 1972: The Sandy Duncan Show (TV series) – writer
- 1972: The Partridge Family (TV series) – writer
- 1972-1973: Love, American Style (TV series) – writer
- 1973: Needles and Pins (TV series) – writer
- 1974: Mitzi... A Tribute to the American Housewife (TV series) – writer
- 1974: Really Raquel (TV series) – writer
- 1972-1974: The Bob Newhart Show (TV series) – writer
- 1977: Bumpers (TV movie) – producer, writer
- 1974-1977: Rhoda (TV series) – executive producer director, writer, executive script consultant
- 1980: The Associates (TV series) – director
- 1980=1981: Archie Bunker's Place (TV series) – director
- 1983: It's Not Easy (TV series) – director, creative consultant
- 1984: Second Edition (TV movie) – director
- 1985: Goodbye Charlie (TV movie) – director
- 1985: Letting Go (TV movie) – writer
- 1985: Cagney & Lacey (TV series) – director
- 1987: The Tortellis (TV series) – director
- 1988: Real Life, CBS Summer Playhouse (TV series) – executive producer, director, writer
- 1989: A Fine Romance (TV series) – executive producer
- 1997: The Good News (TV series) – director
- 1992: The Powers That Be (TV series) – executive producer, writer
- 1993: Almost Home (TV series) – executive producer
- 1995: Kirk (TV series) – executive producer
- 1998: Veronica's Closet (TV series) – writer
- 1998: The Tony Danza Show (TV series) – writer
