= Fluppy Dogs =

- Written by: Haskell Barkin; Bruce Talkington
- Directed by: Fred Wolf
- Starring: Marshall Efron; Lorenzo Music; Susan Blu; Hal Smith; Michael Rye
- Music by: Shirley Walker
- Country of origin: United States
- Original language: English

Production
- Producer: Fred Wolf
- Running time: 44 minutes
- Production company: Walt Disney Television Animation

Original release
- Network: ABC
- Release: November 27, 1986

Fluppy Dogs is a one-hour American animated television special that aired on November 27 (Thanksgiving), 1986 on ABC. It was intended to be a pilot for the third Walt Disney Television animated series, but the show was cancelled due to the special's low ratings. It featured five pastel-colored, or "fluppy", talking dogs that came through a fluppy interdimensional doorway and into the lives of Jamie and his teenage neighbor Claire. The dogs were the intended prey of the evil miser Wagstaff. Animation was supplied by TMS Entertainment, who had previously been contracted by Disney on another concurrently running animated series, Adventures of the Gummi Bears.

== Plot ==
The basic premise for the series, akin to the much later live-action sci-fi series Sliders, was the story of a band of adventurous, cuddly, dog-like creatures called Fluppies who use a crystal key to open inter-dimensional doorways. They are on a mountain of one world in perilous weather, and use the crystal key to escape, ending up in a jungle world the Fluppies are chased by a big purple dinosaur-like creature, they find another portal and escape into a supermarket on Earth.

Mistaken for regular dogs, they are captured and placed in a pound. However, prior to their capture, one of the Fluppies was seen shouting to the others which was noticed by J.J. Wagstaff, a ruthless businessman. As their only means of escape, Stanley, the leader of the Fluppies, manages to get a woman to pick him as a pet for her son, Jamie; he plans to eventually return to the pound to free the others. Jamie is disappointed at this new dog, which is smaller than he hoped, but he takes him for a walk. Taking the opportunity, Stanley escapes his leash and makes a break for it, but Jamie pursues him so as to not anger his mother for losing his new pet so soon. The chase leads to a construction site and Jamie finds himself in danger, forcing Stanley to reveal his intelligence and humanoid nature to save him. Meanwhile, Wagstaff, whose mansion is filled with hunting trophies and live exotic animals, sees in an old book the talking dogs he had seen earlier; they are identified as Fluppies. Wagstaff vows to add the Fluppies to his menagerie.

Now with a secret, Stanley explains the situation and Jamie offers to help. However, the boy only has enough money to purchase one of Stanley's compatriots, Tippi, and his mother will not let him keep her, though Jamie's neighbor Claire eagerly agrees to take her in. That night, as Jamie and Stanley sleep, the boy reflexively scratches the Fluppy's head, which causes their bed to fly. Once they awaken and learn how to control the flying effect, Stanley resolves to break his compatriots out that night and pick up Tippi to do so, inadvertently revealing their nature to Claire in the process. At the pound, Stanley and Tippi manage to free their friends and barely avoid Wagstaff, who had the pound opened to seize them.

The next day, the Fluppies depart to find another dimensional portal, but they need Jamie's help. He leaves school to aid them. This portal turns out to lead to a water world, and the company are flooded out and have to return to Jamie's home to dry out. Hiding in the basement, the Fluppies discover another portal inside the house, but opening it releases a large rambunctious creature that runs about, throwing Jamie's home into a shambles before they can bring it under control, with Claire naming the creature "Falumpus". Although the gang manages to put the house in order before Jamie's mother comes home from work, she gets news that Jamie cut school. Angry at her son for playing hooky, she asks many questions, which Jamie concocts a long story whilst the Fluppies clandestinely keep the Falumpus pacified in the basement by feeding it flowers.

Hoping to avoid ruining Jamie's life anymore, some of the Fluppies continue their search on their own while Stanley and Tippi keep the Falumpus hidden in the basement. The venturing Fluppies come to a library and finally locate the portal to their home world, but while they are returning to tell the other Fluppies the news, Wagstaff captures Ozzie, forcing Stanley and Tippi to ask for Claire's help. Jamie sees them depart in Claire's car as he and the youngest Fluppies ride on the Falumpus in pursuit. However, Wagstaff has been expecting this and manages to capture Stanley and Tippi in his home and threatens to call the police on the children for breaking and entering.

With a desperate plan, the Fluppies convince Wagstaff to let the children "say goodbye" and signals them to scratch on all their heads. The combined strength of this magic tears the entire section of Wagstaff's house into the air. As the occupants struggle to keep their footing with the violent jostling, the Fluppies reach the portal at the front of the library and they crash land the building in front of it. As they struggle to open this portal, which enters into the Fluppies' home dimension, Wagstaff and his butler Hamish find themselves knocked inside by the Falumpus while Stanley's company bolts to safety. Before Wagstaff and Hamish can exit, the door closes permanently, leaving Jamie and Claire alone in their own reality.

Months later in winter, Jamie and Claire have grown to be close friends after their adventure, but they miss the Fluppies. Stanley suddenly appears, saying that adventure is an important part of life. His fellow Fluppies appear saying they missed Claire and Jamie, and Stanley reveals that he has found a way to stabilize the portal between his homeworld and Earth. Hundreds of Fluppies line up to pass through the portal, eager to tour Earth.

== Cast ==
Some of the characters in the Fluppy Dogs and the voice actors that played them were:

- Carl Steven as Jamie Bingham
- Jessica Pennington as Claire the Neighbor
- Marshall Efron as Stanley the Blue Loyal Fluppy
- Susan Blu as Tippi the Pink Loving Fluppy and Bink the Yellow Shy Fluppy
- Lorenzo Music as Ozzie the Green Cool Fluppy
- Hal Smith as Dink the Red Playful Fluppy and Mr. Hamish
- Cloyce Morrow as Mrs. Bingham
- Michael Rye as J.J. Wagstaff

== Production ==
=== Differences from the book ===
The Fluppy Dogs merchandise (including dolls, coloring books and puzzles) released in the 1980s featured images based on a children's book, and which were apparently based on preliminary designs for the Fluppies. These were slightly different from the designs that appeared in the actual pilot film.

In the book, the Fluppy Dogs are as follows: Fanci Flup (pink/white with a pink hairbow), Cuddle Flup (purple/white with two purple hairbows), Brave Flup (blue/white with a plaid bandana), Cool Flup (green/white with sunglasses), Shy Flup (peach/white with a flowered hat), and Silly Flup (yellow/white with two yellow hairbows).

== Broadcast ==
Fluppy Dogs premiered on ABC on November 27, 1986. ABC rebroadcast the special on August 30, 1987 as the Sunday Disney Movie.

== Reception ==
The Fluppy Dogs special made its debut on the U.S. television network ABC during the Thanksgiving turkey feast, on November 27, 1986, pre-empting We Are One World. It scored a Nielsen rating of 5.3/10; placing 70th among network programming, it was the week's lowest-ranked ABC film.

== Legacy ==
The Fluppy Dogs made a cameo appearance in the DuckTales (2017) season three episode "Let's Get Dangerous!".

== See also ==
- List of Thanksgiving television specials
