= Pole Position (TV series) =

- Genre: Animated series
- Created by: Jean Chalopin
- Based on: Pole Position by Namco
- Developed by: Michael Reaves; Jean Chalopin; Chuck Lorre
- Directed by: Bernard Deyriès; Ginny McSwain (voice director)
- Creative directors: Gary Selvaggio; Mitsuki Nakamura
- Voices of: David Coburn; Lisa Lindgren; Melvin Franklin; Darryl Hickman
- Composers: Shuki Levy; Haim Saban
- Countries of origin: United States; Japan
- Original language: English
- No. of seasons: 1
- No. of episodes: 13

Production
- Executive producers: Jean Chalopin; Andy Heyward
- Producers: Mitsuru Kaneko; Koichi Ishiguro
- Cinematography: Kenichi Yoshizaka
- Editor: Harutoshi Ogata
- Running time: 25 minutes
- Production companies: DIC Enterprises; MK Company

Original release
- Network: CBS
- Release: September 15 – December 8, 1984

Pole Position is an animated action and science fiction series produced by DIC Enterprises and MK Company. The series aired for one season in 1984 and appeared in re-runs for a few years thereafter. The series is loosely based on the arcade racing video game series Pole Position by Namco, though the game and the television program have very little in common beyond the basic concept of auto racing and two cars from the game being featured in the series.

== Plot ==
The show features the Darretts, a family of stunt-driving crime fighters, who investigated and thwarted wrongdoing while operating under the front of a traveling show known as the "Pole Position Stunt Show", which was sponsored by the United States government in order to give cover for their investigative activity and provide maintenance for the high-demand vehicles. The Darretts had two adult children and a third child who was much younger in age. A road accident ended the life of the parents, and the father's younger brother, known as Uncle Zack, took charge of the stunt show. He said that now that the patriarch and his wife were dead, it was incumbent upon the two adult children, Tess and Dan, to continue their parents' dangerous and proud work.

The vehicles feature numerous hidden gadgets like water skis and hover jets. The vehicles' computers themselves are portable and can be removed from the dashboards and carried around using handles. They are often referred to as "the modules", a characters who appear as talking computer-drawn faces displayed on video screens.

=== Characters ===
- Tess Darrett (voiced by Lisa Lindgren) is an older sister of Dan and Daisy and the de facto leader of the group who drives Wheels.
- Dan Darrett (voiced by David Coburn) is Tess's hot-headed younger brother who drives Roadie.
- Daisy Darrett (voiced by Kaleena Kiff) is the younger pre-teen sister of Dan and Tess.
- Dr. Zachary Darrett (voiced by Jack Angel) is a wheelchair-using engineer and uncle of the Darrett kids, and runs the Pole Position operation and vehicle development.
- Kuma (voiced by Marilyn Schreffler) is Daisy's pet and a strange genetic hybrid between a raccoon and a monkey.
- Wheels (voiced by Melvin Franklin) is a red and black 1965 Ford Mustang driven by Tess and its AI computer is more careful than Roadie.
- Roadie (voiced by Darryl Hickman) is a more futuristic-looking light-blue coupe driven by Dan, and its AI computer is very smart and keeps Dan out of trouble.

== Principal cast ==
- Lisa Lindgren – Tess Darrett
- Kaleena Kiff – Daisy Darrett
- David Coburn – Dan Darrett
- Jack Angel – Dr. Zachary Darrett
- Marilyn Scheffler – Kuma
- Mel Franklin – Wheels
- Darryl Hickman – Roadie

=== Additional voices ===
- Neilson Ross
- Paul Kirby
- Phillip Clark
- Jered Barclay
- Brian Cummings
- Irv Immerman
- Steve Schatzberg
- Barry Gordon
- Derek McGrath
- Tony Pope
- Hal Smith
- Bob Towers

== Crew ==
- Story editors: Michael Reaves and Jean Chalopin
- Writers: Marc Scott Zicree, Chuck Lorre, Ted Pedersen, Rowby Goren, Michael Reaves
- Director: Bernard Deyriès
- Voice director: Ginny McSwain

== Episodes ==
No.	Title	Original release date
1	"The Code"	September 15, 1984
A rogue Pole Position agent by the name of Greg Dumont, a love interest of Tess, is hired by a criminal mastermind by the name of Alex Vance to steal the control codes to Roadie and Wheels in an attempt to get his hands on the high-tech cars and use the A.I.s to destroy Pole Position.
2	"The Canine Vanishes"	September 22, 1984
The team goes to the Florida Everglades looking for Pandora, a lost dog that is carrying an important vaccine. They must find the dog before enemy agents gets their hands on her.
3	"The Chicken Who Knew Too Much"	September 29, 1984
The team protects a chicken, given to them as a gift from an archaeologist, but when a bad guy shows up to abduct the fowl, the team must figure out the bird's link to finding a hidden treasure.
4	"Strangers on the Ice"	October 6, 1984
The team is assigned to deliver satellite equipment to a mountain research station but the equipment is stolen, and a snowstorm thwarts the kids' attempts at getting it back.
5	"The Race"	October 13, 1984
The team enters a race suspected to be used to smuggle a computer chip out of the country.
6	"The Thirty-Nine Stripes"	October 20, 1984
The team is assigned to protect museum paintings that are being mysteriously vandalized; the cut pieces secretly contain a diagram for an advanced computer chip.
7	"The Thirty-One Cent Mystery"	October 27, 1984
Kuma uncovers a plot to steal an Indian totem hidden somewhere at Mount Rushmore. He tries to warn the others with a quarter, nickel, and a penny (31 cents) all of which have the same presidents as the monument: Washington, Jefferson, and Lincoln.
8	"Dial M for Magic"	November 3, 1984
The team gets stuck in a weird town controlled by a strange illusionist.
9	"The Bear Affair"	November 10, 1984
Daisy receives a talking teddy bear which is pointing out mysterious clues about a factory. Tess and Dan investigate the factory hoping to discover clues.
10	"To Clutch a Thief"	November 17, 1984
Dan and Tess are invited to their hometown to celebrate a queen's pageant where Tess is made carnival queen, but the queen's amulet she wears is a fake made of candy as the real one goes missing. Clues lead to a jealous woman who makes the candy amulets and holds a grudge that she was not chosen as queen every year and finds out her son stole the actual amulet for her.
11	"The Secret"	November 24, 1984
The team is stranded in an unfriendly town and harassed by the local sheriff. The unwelcoming treatment leads the team to suspect criminal activity at the town's gold mine and that the sheriff may be involved, only to be beat to the punch when Tess is arrested with a gold nugget on her.
12	"Shadow of a Trout"	December 1, 1984
Uncle Zach is missing and the kids find out they are suspects in his disappearance.
13	"The Trouble with Kuma"	December 8, 1984
The kids go to an island threatened by a tsunami to rescue Dr. Lungo (Kuma's creator). They find that Lungo's shady assistants are trying to kill him and steal his genetic research.

== Production ==
The show was produced by DIC Audiovisuel's American branch DIC Enterprises (who licensed the Pole Position name from Namco) in association with Japanese studio MK Company. The animation services were provided by Artmic, Mushi Production, and K.K. DIC Asia. The character designs were provided by Filipino cartoonist Jesse Santos, and the mechanical designs were provided by Artmic's co-founder Shinji Aramaki.

== Broadcast ==
Pole Position ran for 13 episodes on CBS in 1984 as part of its Saturday morning children's programming line-up, continuing in reruns through September 1986. The show also aired in reruns for a few months as a Showtime in 1986, 1987 and 1988, followed by a run on The Family Channel (now Freeform) from the late 1980s through the early 1990s.

It was also shown in the United Kingdom during the 1980s, at first on Saturday Superstore in 1986 and in the CBBC strand, then was repeated in the early 1990s on Saturday mornings as part of Going Live! on BBC1.

== Home media ==
Brightspark Productions released a 4-disc box set containing all 13 complete episodes of the series on DVD in the UK on April 21, 2008.

Mill Creek Entertainment released 10 of the 13 episodes of the series in a combo pack with 10 episodes of C.O.P.S. and 10 episodes of Jayce and the Wheeled Warriors on January 10, 2012. Later in 2016, Mill Creek released TV Toons To Go, a 10-disc compilation of various cartoons owned by Cookie Jar Group, now by WildBrain, and the 10th disc of that set contains the remaining 3 episodes of Pole Position that were not included on the combo pack DVD set.
