= Rhoda =

American sitcom (1974–1978)

- First season title card (1974–1975)
- Genre: Sitcom
- Created by: James L. Brooks; Allan Burns
- Based on: Rhoda Morgenstern by James L. Brooks and Allan Burns
- Developed by: David Davis; Lorenzo Music
- Starring: Valerie Harper; Julie Kavner; David Groh; Nancy Walker; Harold Gould; Lorenzo Music; Ron Silver; Ray Buktenica; Kenneth McMillan
- Theme music composer: Billy Goldenberg
- Composer: Billy Goldenberg
- Country of origin: United States
- Original language: English
- No. of seasons: 5
- No. of episodes: 110 (list of episodes)

Production
- Production locations: CBS Studio Center; Studio City, California
- Running time: 25–26 minutes
- Production company: MTM Enterprises

Original release
- Network: CBS
- Release: September 9, 1974 – December 9, 1978

Related
- The Mary Tyler Moore Show; Carlton Your Doorman; Mary and Rhoda

Rhoda is an American sitcom television series created by James L. Brooks and Allan Burns starring Valerie Harper that originally aired on CBS for five seasons from September 9, 1974, to December 9, 1978. It was the first spin-off of The Mary Tyler Moore Show in which Harper reprised her role as Rhoda Morgenstern, a spunky and flamboyantly fashioned young woman seen as unconventional by the standards of her Jewish family from New York City. The series was originally distributed by Viacom Enterprises.

Rhoda begins as the character returns to New York where she soon meets and marries Joe Gerard (David Groh). The series' third season chronicles the characters' separation and Rhoda's later seasons revolved mainly around the character's misadventures as a single divorcée. Main co-stars included Julie Kavner as Rhoda's sister Brenda alongside Nancy Walker as their mother Ida Morgenstern. Other co-stars throughout the series included The Mary Tyler Moore Show writer Lorenzo Music as Rhoda and Brenda's scarcely seen doorman Carlton, Harold Gould as their father Martin Morgenstern, Ron Silver as their neighbor Gary Levy, Ray Buktenica as Brenda's boyfriend and later fiancé Benny Goodwin, and Kenneth McMillan as Rhoda's boss Jack Doyle.

A large ratings success during its first two seasons, Rhoda's viewership suffered following the creative decision to dissolve the marriage of Rhoda and Joe as series creators Brooks and Burns believed that the title character had lost her "edge" as a married woman. The series' later seasons failed to recapture the commercial success it had initially enjoyed and CBS ultimately cancelled Rhoda midway through its fifth season in 1978, leaving a few unaired episodes that later appeared in syndication. Rhoda was the recipient of two Golden Globe Awards and two Primetime Emmy Awards, and was filmed Friday evenings in front of a live studio audience at CBS Studio Center, Stage 14 in Studio City, Los Angeles, California.

== Broadcast history ==
Season	Episodes	Originally released		Rank	Rating
Season	Episodes	First released	Last released	Rank	Rating
1	25	September 9, 1974	March 10, 1975	6	26.3
2	24	September 8, 1975	March 1, 1976	7	24.4
3	24	September 20, 1976	March 13, 1977	33	19.7
4	24	October 2, 1977	April 23, 1978	25	20.1
5	13	September 23, 1978	December 9, 1978	95	12.7

== Synopsis ==
=== Seasons 1 and 2 (1974–1976) ===
"My name is Rhoda Morgenstern. I was born in the Bronx, New York in December, 1941. I've always felt responsible for World War II. The first thing I remember liking that liked me back was food. I had a bad puberty; it lasted 17 years. I'm a high school graduate. I went to art school. My entrance exam was on a book of matches. I decided to move out of the house when I was 24; my mother still refers to this as the time I ran away from home. Eventually I ran to Minneapolis where it's cold, and I figured I'd keep better. Now I'm back in Manhattan. New York, this is your last chance!"

— Rhoda Morgenstern's opening narration from Season 1.

The pilot episode, entitled "Joe", aired on CBS on Monday, September 9, 1974, at 9:30 p.m. and immediately set a record by being the first television series ever to achieve a number-one Nielsen rating for its premiere episode, defeating the ABC ratings juggernaut, Monday Night Football in the process. ABC aired a college football game, Notre Dame versus Georgia Tech, to fill a gap one week before the start of the NFL season.

The episode opens with Rhoda Morgenstern traveling from her home in Minneapolis to New York City, where she was born and raised, for a two-week vacation, staying with her younger sister, Brenda (Julie Kavner). Brenda works as a bank teller and suffers from low self-esteem exacerbated by dating problems, similar to how Rhoda herself had experienced difficulty in dating in Minneapolis in the early years of The Mary Tyler Moore Show.

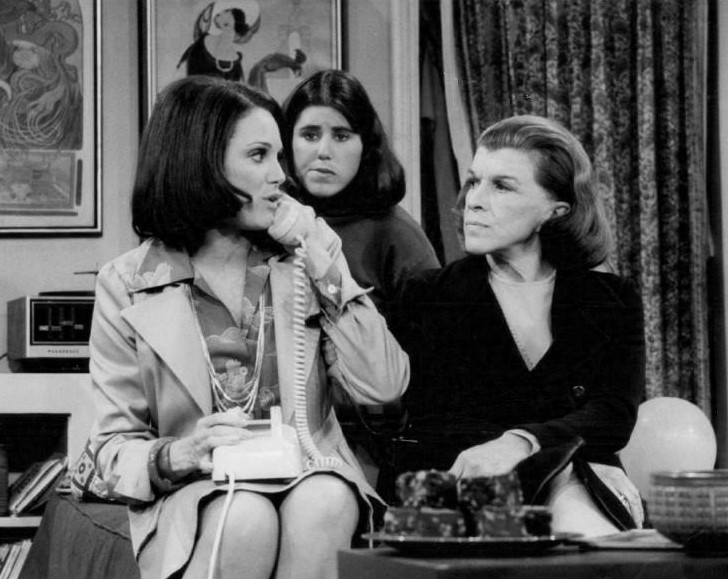
Rhoda is staying with Brenda for a vacation; Brenda and Ida think it will be for longer than that.

While there, she meets Joe Gerard (David Groh), a handsome divorcé who owns a wrecking company and has a ten-year-old son, Donny, whom Brenda babysits. Following Brenda's prompting, Rhoda and Joe meet and develop an instant attraction to each other which leads to their dating nightly for the duration of her vacation. After an argument about their feelings for each other, Joe asks Rhoda to stay in New York City, which she does, initially moving in with Brenda at 332 E. 64th Street (however, actual exterior shots are of 332 East 84th Street, between 1st and 2nd Avenues on the southeast end of the block).

Rhoda and Brenda soon realize that the small studio apartment can't hold them both, so Rhoda moves in with their parents Ida (Nancy Walker) and Martin (Harold Gould) at their apartment in The Bronx. Ida and Martin are the stereotypical Jewish parents. Ida is overbearing, overprotective, benevolently manipulative, and desperate to ensure her daughters find good husbands. Martin is her dutiful, mild-mannered husband. Ida initially goes to great lengths to baby her daughter. When it becomes apparent Rhoda is sliding into a rut by occupying her childhood bedroom, Ida forces her to move out for her own good.

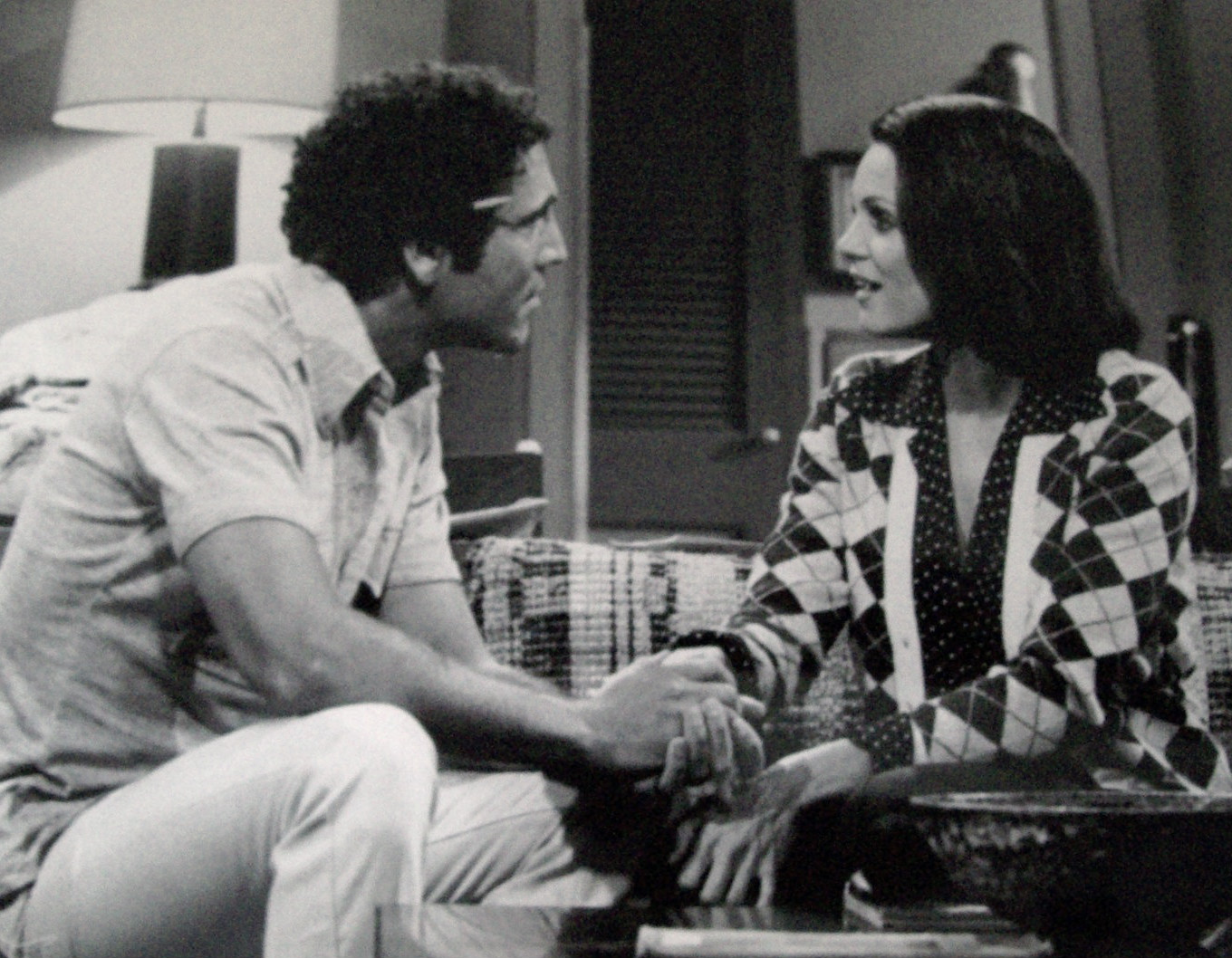
Joe asks Rhoda to move in with him.

As the weeks go by, the relationship between Joe and Rhoda quickly blossoms. By the sixth episode, "Pop Goes the Question", an insecure Rhoda asks Joe where their relationship is heading. His response is to invite Rhoda to move in with him. After some careful thought, and consultation with her sister and father, Rhoda accepts Joe's invitation, but within minutes of moving in decides that rather than living together out of wedlock she prefers to be married. Rhoda attempts to convince Joe that they are very compatible and would be a happily married couple. After some hesitation, Joe agrees and a wedding is planned.

==== Rhoda's wedding ====
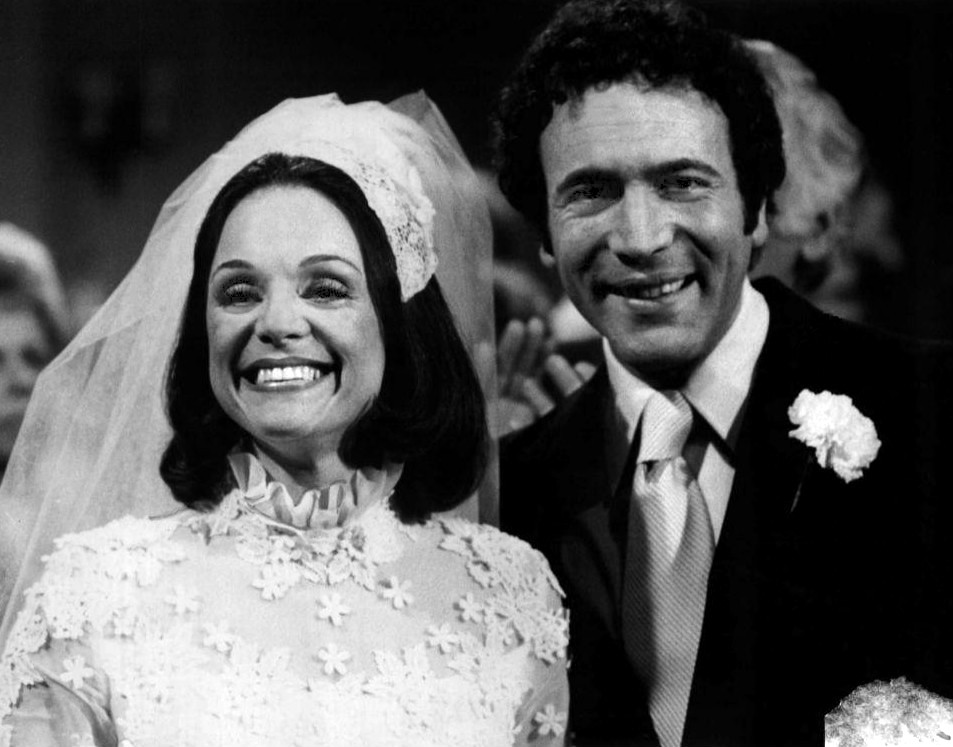
Rhoda and Joe.

Eight weeks into the series, on Monday, October 28, 1974, Rhoda and Joe were married in a special hour-long episode that broke several television viewership records. Heavily publicized, it became the highest-rated television episode of the 1970s, a record it held until the miniseries Roots claimed that achievement in 1977. Additionally, on the night of its airing it became the second-most-watched television episode of all time, surpassed only by the 1953 episode of I Love Lucy in which Little Ricky was born.

It was watched by more than 52 million Americans, over half of the US viewing audience, and is still the second most-watched primetime wedding (Max Klinger's wedding in the final episode of M*A*S*H had 110 million viewers but was not the main plotline). At the conclusion of the episode, Monday Night Football host Howard Cosell joked on ABC that he had not been invited to the wedding, and welcomed viewers back to the game. Hundreds of "wedding parties" were held by fans across the United States on the night of the episode to celebrate the television wedding, and within days the CBS-TV studios were inundated with wedding gifts sent in by fans for the fictional Joe and Rhoda Gerard. The episode was overwhelmingly praised by critics, widely touted as a "television phenomenon", "unlike anything that had happened on television for nearly twenty years", and garnered Harper her fourth Emmy award in 1975. Vogue magazine reported that people across the country had pulled off the road checking into motels, and that friends had canceled dinner invitations (feigning illness), just to watch Rhoda's wedding.

The wedding episode featured guest appearances by many of the main characters from The Mary Tyler Moore Show, including Mary Richards (Mary Tyler Moore), Lou Grant (Edward Asner), Murray Slaughter (Gavin MacLeod), Georgette Franklin (Georgia Engel), and Phyllis Lindstrom (Cloris Leachman). The only major characters who didn't attend were Ted Baxter (Ted Knight) and Sue Ann Nivens (Betty White).

In The Mary Tyler Moore Show episode "The New Sue Ann", airing Saturday, October 26, 1974, two days before "Rhoda's Wedding", the characters frequently discuss the upcoming event and buy wedding gifts. At the end of the episode Murray and Lou leave the TV station to drive Mary to the airport. During "Rhoda's Wedding" it is revealed that on a lark Lou and Murray have decided to fly to New York with Mary to surprise Rhoda. Her frequent nemesis, Phyllis, who intentionally had not been invited, nonetheless flies in for the wedding, and Mary and Rhoda's friend, Georgette, drives in from Minneapolis.

During the episode, Phyllis asks for the opportunity to participate in the wedding and is appointed the responsibility to pick up Rhoda at Brenda's Manhattan apartment and drive her to her parents' apartment in the Bronx, where the ceremony is being held. The self-absorbed and forgetful Phyllis neglects to keep her promise. This forces Rhoda to take the subway, running through the streets of Manhattan and the Bronx fully regaled in her wedding dress and veil and dashing into her parents' apartment building in one of the most memorable moments in the history of series television.

In a state of shock, Ida refuses Phyllis's profuse apologies, saying "I'll kill you". Phyllis begs everyone in the room to forgive her, but the only one who does is Georgette, who then suggests to Phyllis that she leave before Rhoda arrives. The episode also features special closing credits, showing additional footage of Rhoda (Harper) running down a Manhattan street in her wedding dress and veil accompanied by an alternative version of the theme song played to the tune of Mendelssohn's Wedding March.

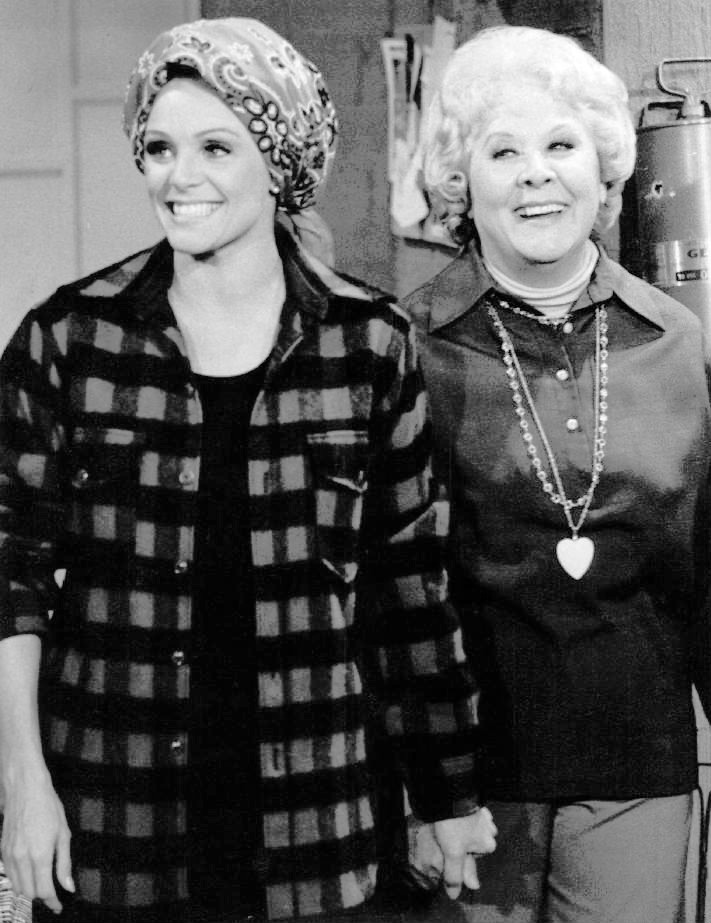
Vivian Vance guest stars in the episode "Friends and Mothers" (1975).

For the remainder of the first and second seasons, the show focuses on Rhoda and Joe's new married life. The two move into a penthouse suite in the same building as Brenda. Rhoda advances in her career as a window dresser by opening up a small window dressing business called "Windows by Rhoda" with her old high school friend Myrna Morgenstein (Barbara Sharma). Rhoda uses her own maiden surname "Morgenstern" in her professional dealings as a window dresser and her married surname "Gerard" in her personal life.

During this period, the show was a massive ratings hit on Monday nights, staying near the top of the ratings in both seasons, even faring better than its parent, The Mary Tyler Moore Show. In early seasons, the closing credits of the series featured Rhoda on a New York street trying to imitate Mary Tyler Moore's trademark hat toss, but the cap slips from Rhoda's hand before she can throw it. Upon moving from The Mary Tyler Moore Show to her own eponymous series, Rhoda's Jewish religious and ethnic background seemed to fade as she was no longer unique, and would be surrounded by a host of New Yorkers of different religions and ethnicities.

Throughout the tenure of Rhoda Morgenstern's character being featured on The Mary Tyler Moore Show, her "Jewishness" was discussed on several episodes. Such episodes included: "Some of My Best Friends are Rhoda" from which the subject of anti-Semitism was covered; "Enter Rhoda's Parents", from which Rhoda's parents renewed their wedding vows by a rabbi; and "A Girl's Best Mother Is Not Her Friend", in which Ida wanted to fix Mary up with an eligible bachelor, a man whom she'd deemed inappropriate for Rhoda, as he wasn't Jewish. This candid expression of "Jewishness" changed, however, when Rhoda was spun off in 1974. During the first season of Rhoda, the representation of Rhoda Morgenstern altered from her parent show to fit a more mainstream audience: she was trimmer, more confident, and less "Jewish". Throughout the first season, there were scant references about Rhoda's "Jewishness".

Moreover, there was even a Christmas episode with no mention of the character's Jewish background entitled, "Guess What I Got You for the Holidays". Thus, the creation of Rhoda's own series stifled the representation of "Jewishness" – as Charlotte Brown, the executive producer of Rhoda, conveyed in an interview the display of "Jewishness", "was just 'set dressing' – Ida's brisket, her plastic on the furniture". Ironically, although Harper and Walker achieved great popularity playing characters of the Jewish faith and ethnicity, in real life, neither actress was Jewish.

In the first season of Rhoda, Mary Tyler Moore made four guest appearances as Mary Richards to help with the transition of Rhoda moving from Minneapolis to New York City, getting married, and establishing her new life. The episodes Moore appeared in were: the premiere episode "Joe"; the sixth installment "Pop Goes The Question"; the two-part hour- long episode "Rhoda's Wedding" – which also featured other characters from The Mary Tyler Moore Show such as Lou Grant (Edward Asner), Murray Slaughter (Gavin MacLeod), Georgette Franklin (Georgia Engel), and Phyllis Lindstrom (Cloris Leachman) – and the season finale "Along Comes Mary". During the second season, Moore made no appearances on Rhoda, but Valerie Harper and David Groh were briefly featured as Rhoda and Joe Gerard on The Mary Tyler Moore Show's eleventh installment of the sixth season "Mary Richards Falls in Love".

=== Season 3 (1976–1977) ===
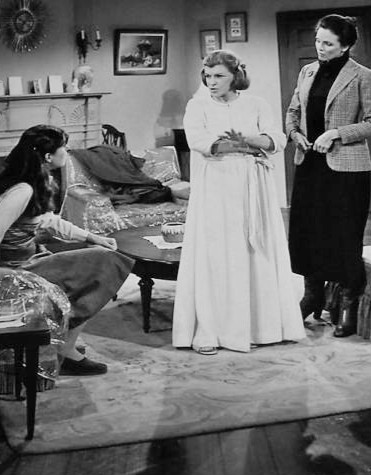
When Ida gets depressed, Brenda and Rhoda try to help.

In the first episode of the third season during a particularly dramatic scene Joe leaves Rhoda and the two remain separated for the entire season, with Groh appearing in only nine of the season's episodes. A few weeks later, they mutually agree to see a marriage counselor where Joe reveals to a stunned Rhoda that he had never wanted to be married, and that he married her only because she had pressured him into it after he had invited her to live with him.

Audiences were equally stunned and deserted the program in droves. Although the producers believed the plot development was essential, the fan response to Rhoda and Joe's separation was overwhelmingly negative and hostile. CBS was inundated with thousands of angry letters protesting the plot development, "Rhoda" and "Joe" received sympathy cards and letters of condolence, with Groh later reporting that he had received hate mail for as much as a year after the season had ended. This sentiment would translate into a steep ratings decline during the course of the season and the show ranked #25 for the 1976–77 season (falling from #7 the year before). Though Ida appears in the opening episode ("The Separation"), both she and Martin are absent for the remainder of the season, explained as traveling across the country in an RV. In reality, Nancy Walker departed the program to headline two short-lived ABC series: The Nancy Walker Show, and Blansky's Beauties; and Harold Gould left to star in his own ABC show, The Feather and Father Gang. To help fill in the void left by Walker and Gould, the producers hired comedian Anne Meara as Rhoda's new friend, Sally Gallagher, a middle-aged divorcee who works as an airline stewardess. Viewers did not warm to Meara and her character appeared in only seven episodes, disappearing shortly after the beginning of 1977.

With Rhoda and Joe now separated, they soon move out of their apartment. Joe moves to another building while Rhoda trades apartments with downstairs neighbor Gary Levy (Ron Silver), a jean-store owner who soon strikes up a platonic friendship with Rhoda. Stories initially center on Rhoda and Joe's attempts to work through their differences. As the season progresses, however, Joe is seen less frequently and episodes show Rhoda coping with her single status or feature Brenda-themed stories. Ultimately, they never reconcile and Joe is never seen again after the eighteenth installment "The Ultimatum". Johnny Venture (Michael DeLano), a lounge singer, becomes an occasional suitor/friend whom Rhoda begrudgingly tolerates. Meanwhile, Brenda, no longer overweight but still with self-esteem problems, has three persistent romantic interests: immature accordion player Nick Lobo, who returns from the previous season; neighbor Gary Levy; and toward the end of the season, an enthusiastic rollerskater and toll-booth worker Benny Goodwin (Ray Buktenica), who is, initially, constantly assumed to be the son of great big band conductor/musician, Benny Goodman. This last character, who only appears twice this season, will become a major character in the next.

During the third season of Rhoda, Mary Tyler Moore made her final guest appearance as Mary Richards (in the same episode in which Joe makes his final appearance). Also that year, Valerie Harper appeared as Rhoda, along with Cloris Leachman as Phyllis, on the final episode of The Mary Tyler Moore Show entitled "The Last Show".

=== Season 4 (1977–1978) ===
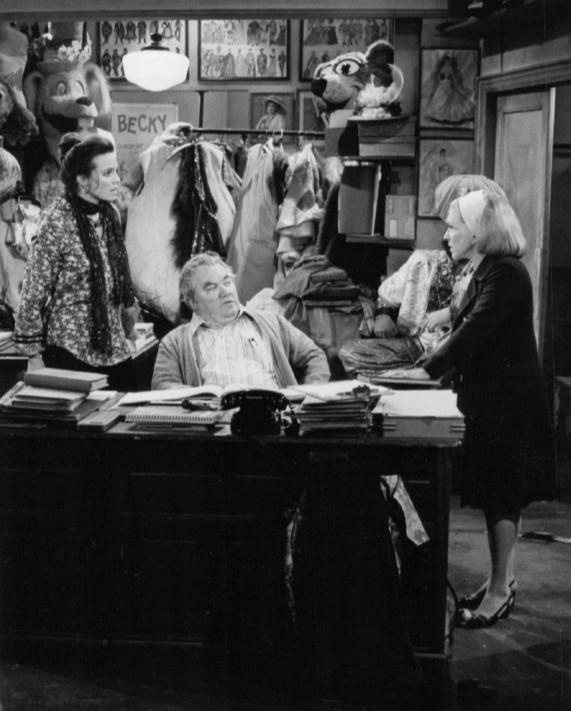
Ida takes a job at the costume store where Rhoda works.

For the fourth season, Rhoda re-emerged with a new, slimmer look. (Before the season started, Valerie Harper went on a liquid protein diet, which was quite controversial at the time, and dropped 40 pounds.) Rhoda's divorce is finalized and she resumes use of her maiden name "Morgenstern" full time. (From this point on, neither her ex-husband, Joe Gerard, nor Rhoda's friend from the previous season, Sally Gallagher, are ever mentioned again.) The show then centers on her role as a thirty-something divorcée, rarely dating and focusing on her career. Ida and Martin come home after a year's absence from their lengthy cross-country trip (in reality, both Nancy Walker's and Harold Gould's attempts at new series the previous year had failed).

Brenda continues to date Gary Levy and Benny Goodwin, one more than the other. Meanwhile, Rhoda's career is undergoing a transition. Seeking a career change, she finds a job at the Doyle Costume Company. There she works for the gruff Jack Doyle (Kenneth McMillan), a man with similarities to Lou Grant. Season 4 ranked higher than season 3 in the ratings (finishing at #21 for the year), but Rhoda never regained the popularity it had achieved during its first two seasons.

=== Season 5 (September–December 1978) ===
In September, 1978, the show underwent additional changes for the fifth and final season. Rhoda sports a new longer frizzy-permed hair style, which she keeps pulled back in a small ponytail for part of the season. Ida and Martin go through a separation of their own, and Martin goes off to Florida to find himself. He returns after several episodes, but Ida wants to be wooed back, leading to dating and other romantic rituals between the two. Brenda and Benny get engaged to be married, with their wedding planned for later in the season (though this would ultimately not happen, due to Rhoda's abrupt midseason cancellation). Gary Levy does not return for this season; it is mentioned near the season's start in Episode 3 that he has moved to Chicago. A new coworker, Tina Molinari (Nancy Lane), joins Rhoda and Jack at the costume shop, having appeared in several Season 4 episodes as an employee at Gary's jeans store.

At this time, the series, along with the Norman Lear sitcom Good Times, was moved to Saturday nights, with Rhoda airing at 8:00 P.M. and Good Times at 8:30 P.M. As a result of the show's competing against NBC's popular police series CHiPs, the ratings for both programs declined drastically. CBS canceled Rhoda in December 1978—midway through its fifth season—with four episodes remaining unaired, though these episodes later aired in syndication. The show ended its final season ranked at #95 out of 114 shows. Good Times was pulled from the CBS schedule in December and returned in the spring of 1979 on Wednesday nights at 8:30 P.M. It finished its sixth season, but its ratings did not improve, with the show ranked at #91. Within a few months, CBS also canceled it.

== Cast ==
=== Main ===
- Valerie Harper – Rhoda Morgenstern Gerard
- Julie Kavner – Brenda Morgenstern
- David Groh – Joe Gerard (seasons 1–3)
- Nancy Walker – Ida Morgenstern (seasons 1–2, 4–5)
- Harold Gould – Martin Morgenstern (seasons 1–2, 4–5)
- Ron Silver – Gary Levy (seasons 3–4)
- Ray Buktenica – Benny Goodwin (seasons 3–5)
- Kenneth McMillan – Jack Doyle (seasons 4–5)
- Lorenzo Music – Carlton, the doorman (voice only)

=== Recurring characters ===
- Carlton, the alcoholic doorman in Rhoda's building, is played by Lorenzo Music (who would later voice Garfield). He is often heard on the intercom, but almost never seen, only his arm occasionally appearing from doors. In the third-season episode "H-e-e-e-r-e's Johnny" he is seen from the back after hitching a cab ride with Rhoda and her friends, and in the episode "What Are You Doing New Year's Eve?" is shown dancing and conversing with Queenie Smith while wearing a gorilla mask. Ruth Gordon played Carlton's mother in the Season 2 episode "Kiss Your Epaulets Goodbye".
- Justin Culp, Joe's wrecking company field employee, is played by Scoey Mitchell.
- Mae, the office bookkeeper at Joe's wrecking company, appears prominently in two episodes during the first season and is played by actress-comedian Cara Williams (of Pete and Gladys).
- Rhoda's girlfriends over the years include: Alice Barth (Candice Azzara); Myrna Morgenstein (Barbara Sharma), whom Rhoda had sat behind in high school when in alphabetical order in home room; Susan Alborn (Beverly Sanders), another friend from high school; and Sally Gallagher (Anne Meara), aka "Big Sally", a divorced airline stewardess who befriends Rhoda and accompanies her in the singles scene. (Meara's husband Jerry Stiller also appears in one episode as Sally's ex-husband.)
- Brenda's boyfriend in early episodes is accordionist Nick Lobo (Richard Masur).
- Lenny Fiedler, Brenda's third cousin whom she dates occasionally, is played by actor Wes Stern. Lenny appears frequently throughout the first two seasons.
- Sandy Franks, Brenda's friend and colleague at the bank at which she works, is played by actress/director Melanie Mayron. She is featured in a few episodes during the 1975–76 season.
- Shortly following her separation from Joe, Rhoda begins an on-again, off-again romance with conceited Las Vegas entertainer Johnny Venture (Michael Delano), who appeared in 11 episodes (1976–78).
- Joe's friend Charlie Burke (whom Rhoda finds annoying) is played by Valerie Harper's then-husband, actor Richard Schaal (who also appears in several episodes of The Mary Tyler Moore Show as at least three different characters and as a regular in the first season of Phyllis).

=== Guest stars ===
Actors featured in guest-starring roles on Rhoda include Robert Alda, René Auberjonois, Frank Converse, Norman Fell, Jack Gilford, Ruth Gordon, Eileen Heckart, Howard Hesseman, Judd Hirsch, Anne Jackson, Linda Lavin, Tim Matheson, Melanie Mayron, John Ritter, Doris Roberts, David Ogden Stiers, Jerry Stiller, Joan Van Ark, Vivian Vance, and Henry Winkler.

Some, like Heckart and Vance, were well-known performers, while the appearance of others, like Mayron and Hesseman, preceded their own shows or roles that brought them to prominence.

== Syndication ==
In 1979, Rhoda began airing in syndication to local stations, and was originally syndicated by Victory Television from 1979 to 1987. From 1981 to 1988, reruns of the show aired on WGN-TV in Chicago. In 1990, reruns of Rhoda aired on Ha!. In 1996, Nick at Nite began airing reruns of Rhoda. On July 8, 2013, Rhoda began airing on MeTV until it was removed in 2018. On March 27, 2023, Rhoda began airing on sister network Catchy Comedy until it was first removed on May 23, 2025. Then, it later returned to the lineup on February 15, 2026.

In Italy, it aired on Rai 2 in 1982.

In the UK, it aired sporadically & in a late night, weekday slot on BBC1.

== Home media ==
=== DVD releases ===
On April 21, 2009, Shout! Factory released the first season of Rhoda on DVD in Region 1, which was the year of the show's 35th anniversary. The release also includes a "Remembering Rhoda" featurette, as well as the original one-hour version of "Rhoda's Wedding", as opposed to the two-part edited version that aired in syndication. 15 of the season's 24 episodes are the edited-for-syndication versions taken from poor quality masters, while the other 9 episodes (including the Wedding episode) are the unedited network versions. A review on DVDTalk also states some of the edited episodes being time compressed. Because the series premiere in the DVD set is the syndicated version, Mary Tyler Moore's appearance at the beginning of the episode is not included. However, the full version of the pilot can be viewed at The Paley Center for Media in New York and Los Angeles. Footage from the missing scene is even included in the end credits to the series premiere.

Season two and Season three episodes were released unedited. Season four was released on September 21, 2010, as a Shout! Factory select title, available exclusively through their online store.

Season four was re-released as a general retail release on August 15, 2017.

Season five was released by Shout! Factory on October 17, 2017.

DVD name	Ep#	Release date
Season One	25	April 21, 2009
Season Two	24	March 30, 2010
Season Three	24	July 6, 2010
Season Four	24	September 21, 2010; August 15, 2017 (re-release)
Season Five: The Final Season	13	October 17, 2017

=== VHS releases ===
A two-tape set, Rhoda—Volumes 1 & 2 containing two episodes on each cassette, was released by MTM Home Video in July 1992.

VHS Name	Ep#	Release date	Titles
Rhoda—Volume 1	2	July 1992	Joe; You Can Go Home Again
Rhoda—Volume 2	2	July 1992	I'll Be Loving You, Sometimes; Parents' Day

The Very Best of Rhoda, a four-tape boxed-set containing the best episodes from each season, was released by MTM Home Video on April 28, 1998.

VHS Name	Ep#	Release date	Titles
Season 1 (1974–75)	2	April 28, 1998	Rhoda's Wedding (Part 1); Rhoda's Wedding (Part 2)
Season 2 (1975–76)	2	April 28, 1998	Friends and Mothers; A Night with the Girls
Season 3 (1976–77)	2	April 28, 1998	The Separation; An Elephant Never Forgets
Seasons 4 & 5 (1977–78)	3	April 28, 1998	One is a Number; Happy Anniversary; Martin Doesn't Live Here Anymore

== Reception ==
=== Ratings ===
Season	Time slot (ET)	Rank	Rating
1974–75	Mondays 9:30 p.m.	#6	26.3
1975–76	Mondays 8:00 p.m.	#7	24.4
1976–77	Mondays 8:00 p.m. (September 20, 1976 – January 10, 1977); Sundays 8:00 p.m. (January 16 – March 13, 1977)	#33	19.7
1977–78	Sundays 8:00 p.m.	#21	20.1
1978–79	Saturdays 8:00 p.m.	#95	12.7

=== Awards and nominations ===
Year	Award	Category	Nominee(s)	Result	Ref.
1974	Directors Guild of America Awards	Outstanding Directorial Achievement in Comedy Series	Robert Moore (for "Rhoda's Wedding")	Nominated	
1974	Golden Globe Awards	Best Television Series – Musical or Comedy		Won	
1974	Golden Globe Awards	Best Actress in a Television Series – Musical or Comedy	Valerie Harper	Won	
1974	Golden Globe Awards	Best Supporting Actress – Television	Julie Kavner	Nominated	
1975	Golden Globe Awards	Best Actress in a Television Series – Musical or Comedy	Valerie Harper	Nominated	
1975	Golden Globe Awards	Best Supporting Actress – Television	Julie Kavner	Nominated	
1975	Golden Globe Awards	Best Supporting Actress – Television	Nancy Walker	Nominated	
1976	Golden Globe Awards	Best Supporting Actress – Television	Julie Kavner	Nominated	
1976	Golden Globe Awards	Best Supporting Actress – Television	Nancy Walker	Nominated	
1978	Golden Globe Awards	Best Supporting Actress – Television	Julie Kavner	Nominated	
1978	Golden Globe Awards	Best Supporting Actress – Television	Nancy Walker	Nominated	
1999	Online Film & Television Association Awards	Television Hall of Fame: Productions		Inducted	
1975	Primetime Emmy Awards	Outstanding Comedy Series	James L. Brooks, Allan Burns, David Davis, and Lorenzo Music	Nominated	
1975	Primetime Emmy Awards	Outstanding Lead Actress in a Comedy Series	Valerie Harper (for "Rhoda's Wedding")	Won	
1975	Primetime Emmy Awards	Outstanding Continuing Performance by a Supporting Actress in a Comedy Series	Julie Kavner	Nominated	
1975	Primetime Emmy Awards	Outstanding Continuing Performance by a Supporting Actress in a Comedy Series	Nancy Walker	Nominated	
1975	Primetime Emmy Awards	Outstanding Writing in a Comedy Series	James L. Brooks, Allan Burns, David Davis, Lorenzo Music, Norman Barasch, Carroll Moore, and David Lloyd (for "Rhoda's Wedding")	Nominated	
1976	Primetime Emmy Awards	Outstanding Lead Actress in a Comedy Series	Valerie Harper	Nominated	
1976	Primetime Emmy Awards	Outstanding Continuing Performance by a Supporting Actress in a Comedy Series	Ruth Gordon (for "Kiss Your Epaulets Goodbye")	Nominated	
1976	Primetime Emmy Awards	Outstanding Continuing Performance by a Supporting Actress in a Comedy Series	Julie Kavner	Nominated	
1976	Primetime Emmy Awards	Outstanding Continuing Performance by a Supporting Actress in a Comedy Series	Nancy Walker	Nominated	
1977	Primetime Emmy Awards	Outstanding Lead Actress in a Comedy Series	Valerie Harper	Nominated	
1977	Primetime Emmy Awards	Outstanding Continuing Performance by a Supporting Actress in a Comedy Series	Julie Kavner	Nominated	
1977	Primetime Emmy Awards	Outstanding Single Performance by a Supporting Actress in a Comedy or Drama Series	Nancy Walker (for "The Separation")	Nominated	
1978	Primetime Emmy Awards	Outstanding Lead Actress in a Comedy Series	Valerie Harper	Nominated	
1978	Primetime Emmy Awards	Outstanding Continuing Performance by a Supporting Actress in a Comedy Series	Julie Kavner	Won	
1978	Primetime Emmy Awards	Outstanding Continuing Performance by a Supporting Actress in a Comedy Series	Nancy Walker	Nominated	
1978	Primetime Emmy Awards	Outstanding Lead Actor for a Single Appearance in a Drama or Comedy Series	Judd Hirsch (for "Rhoda Likes Mike")	Nominated	
1978	Primetime Emmy Awards	Outstanding Single Performance by a Supporting Actor in a Comedy or Drama Series	Harold Gould (for "Happy Anniversary")	Nominated	
2003	TV Land Awards	Hippest Fashion Plate – Female	Valerie Harper	Nominated	
2003	TV Land Awards	Favorite "Heard but Not Seen" Character	Lorenzo Music	Nominated	
2004	TV Land Awards	Favorite "Heard but Not Seen" Character	Lorenzo Music	Nominated	
2005	TV Land Awards	Favorite Mother-in-Law	Nancy Walker	Nominated	
2005	TV Land Awards	Favorite "Heard but Not Seen" Character	Lorenzo Music	Won	
2007	TV Land Awards	Favorite "Heard but Not Seen" Character	Lorenzo Music	Nominated	
1974	Writers Guild of America Awards	Episodic Comedy	Charlotte Brown (for "Parent's Day")	Nominated	
1974	Writers Guild of America Awards	Episodic Comedy	Patricia Nardo and Gloria Banta (for "You Can Go Home Again")	Nominated	
1975	Writers Guild of America Awards	Episodic Comedy	Coleman Mitchell and Geoffrey Neigher (for "Ida's Doctor")	Nominated	
1978	Writers Guild of America Awards	Episodic Comedy	Bob Ellison (for "Rhoda vs. Ida")	Nominated	

== Animated spin-off and cast reunions ==
An animated TV pilot titled Carlton Your Doorman, a proposed spin-off of the Carlton, the doorman character (voiced by Lorenzo Music), was broadcast May 21, 1980 on CBS. Although the episode won a Primetime Emmy Award for Outstanding Animated Program, it was never picked up by the network as a series.

Despite never having reunited in-character on a TV special or movie, some of the cast members of Rhoda got together over the years on the following daytime talk-shows:

- On November 21, 1984, Valerie Harper, Julie Kavner and Nancy Walker reunited to reminisce about the series on the syndicated Hour Magazine (with Gary Collins) in which they hosted a week-long series dedicated to TV reunion shows.
- In May 1996, Valerie Harper, David Groh and Harold Gould (with a voice-over cameo from Lorenzo Music as Carlton, the Doorman) reunited on Sally Jessy Raphael to talk about the show's best moments as reruns of Rhoda began airing on Nick at Nite. Author Julius C. Burnett (author of "Rhoda Revisited"; see below) also appeared briefly in the segment. Interesting episodic facts from Burnett's book were used during a voiceover at the beginning of each episode of Nick at Nite's reruns of the series.

== Books ==
In 1975, Scholastic Books published All About "Rhoda", a non-fiction paperback about the development of the series and the character. The book features interviews with Harper and Groh, and 32 black-and-white photos. All About "Rhoda" was referenced in an episode of The Kids in the Hall during a sketch in which the character Buddy Cole (played by Scott Thompson) identified it as the book he would most want to have with him if he was stranded on a desert island.

Julius C. Burnett wrote Rhoda Revisited, which summarized the series (with a foreword by Valerie Harper) and was released by Ju-Ju & Co. Entertainment LLC on December 21, 2010.
