= Ray Buktenica =

American actor

- Born: August 6, 1943 (age 82); New York City, New York, U.S.
- Occupation: Actor
- Years active: 1972–2006
- Partner: Joyce DeWitt (1973–1980)

Ray Buktenica /bʌkˈtɛniːˈkɑː/ (born August 6, 1943) is a retired American film and television character actor. He has played numerous roles, primarily on television since 1972. He is best known for playing the character Benny Goodwin, the boyfriend and later fiancé of Brenda Morgenstern on the 1970s sitcom Rhoda, Dr. Solomon on House Calls and Jerry Berkson, Libby's boss on Life Goes On. He additionally had a guest role as the voice of Hugo Strange in the Batman: The Animated Series episode "The Strange Secret of Bruce Wayne". In 1996, he guest-starred on Lois & Clark: The New Adventures of Superman as Leo Nunk, a newspaper reporter. In 1997, he guest-starred on Star Trek: Deep Space Nine, in the episode "By Inferno's Light", as Deyos, the Vorta in command of the Dominion's Internment Camp 371.

Buktenica dated actress Joyce Dewitt from 1973 to 1980. The couple also appeared together on several episodes of the popular TV game show Tattletales.

== Filmography ==
Film and Television
Year	Title	Role	Notes
1972	Hawaii Five-O	Billy Grunwald	Episode: "Chain of Events"
1972	The Partridge Family	Assistant Director	Episode: "Whatever Happened to Keith Partridge?"
1973	Hawaii Five-O	Clifford Sprague	Episode: "Jury of One"
1973	Police Story	Supermarket Manager	Episode: "Slow Boy"
1973	Hawkins	Doctor	Episode: "Murder in Movieland"
1973	The Partridge Family	Newsman	Episode: "The Diplomat"
1974	Police Woman	Resident	Episode: "Warning: All Wives"
1976	King Kong	Naval Officer	Feature film
1977	A Circle of Children	Dr. Marino	Television film
1977	Police Woman	Morris	Episode: "Deadline: Death"
1977	The Amazing Howard Hughes	Public Relations Man	Television film
1977	Eight Is Enough	Chalmers	Episode: "Quarantine"
1977	Bumpers	Mr. Dickey	TV pilot episode
1977	Mary Jane Harper Cried Last Night	Dr. Mark Handelman	Television film
1977–78	Rhoda	Benny Goodwin	Main cast (28 episodes)
1979	The Love Boat	Scott Allen	Episode: "The Scoop"
1979–82	House Calls	Dr. Normon Solomon	Main cast (57 episodes)
1980	The Jayne Mansfield Story	Bob Garrett	Television film
1981	The Adventures of Nellie Bly	Kenny Thompson / Narrator	Television film
1983	Wait till Your Mother Gets Home!	Fred	Television film
1983	Fantasy Island	Andy Durant	Episode: "The Tallowed Image"
1983	Imps*	Bob	Feature film (segment: "Long Distances")
1983	The Love Boat	Harold Pack / Jack Honeycutt	Episode: "The Dog Show: Whose Dog Is It Anyway"
1984	W*A*L*T*E*R	Wendell Micklejohn	TV pilot episode
1984	The Love Boat	Marvin Cooperman	Episode: "Dont' Get Mad, Get Even"
1984	Hardcastle and McCormick	David Waverly	Episode: "You and the Horse You Rode in On"
1984	For Love or Money	TV Director	Television film
1985	Simon & Simon	Robert Talbot	Episode: "Simon Without Simon" (Parts 1 & 2)
1985	Heart of a Champion: The Ray Mancini Story	Dave Wolf	Television film
1985	Goodbye Charlie	Ray Lemmon	TV pilot episode
1986	The Twilight Zone	Max	Episode: "Take My Life...Please!"
1986	The George McKenna Story	Alan Keith	Television film
1986	The Art of Being Nick	Bob	TV pilot episode
1987	Down and Out in Beverly Hills	Dr. Adam Shapiro	Episode: "Shapiro's Carmen"
1987	The Hogan Family	Roger	Episode: "Movin' On"
1988	Magnum, P.I.	Bruce Kunkle	Episode: "Transitions"
1988	Police Story: Gladiator School	Heller	Television film
1988	Mutts	Glen	TV pilot episode
1989	Murder, She Wrote	Kyle Laughlin	Episode: "Something Borrowed, Someone Blue"
1989	Empty Nest	Alan	Episode: "Blame It on the Moon"
1989	Head of the Class	Frank Tarish	2 episodes
1989	Heartland	Elton	Episode: "The Sky Is Falling"
1989	Designing Women	Donald	Episode: "One Night with You"
1989–93	Life Goes On	Jerry Berkson	Main cast (23 episodes)
1989	Open House	Dave Hayes	Episode: "Torn Between Two Houses"
1990	Booker	Michael	Episode: "Who Framed Roger Thornton?"
1990	Who's the Boss?	Hank Sloan	Episode: "Sit Down and Be Counted"
1990	Matlock	Ron Winfield	Episode: "The Blackmailer"
1990	Father Dowling Mysteries	Ricky Dupree	Episode: "The Showgirl Mystery"
1991	My Girl	Danny	Feature film
1991–92	Civil Wars	Ronald Peck	2 episodes
1992	Batman: The Animated Series	Hugo Strange	Voice, episode: "The Strange Secret of Bruce Wayne"
1993	Cutters	Chad Conners	Main cast (5 episodes)
1993	The Mommies	Bob	Episode: "Much I Do About Nothing"
1994	Diagnosis: Murder	Mike Baker	Episode: "Murder with Mirrors"
1994	MacShayne: Winner Takes All	Charlie Dear	Television film
1994	L.A. Law	Lenny Mullen	Episode: "How Am I Driving?"
1995	NYPD Blue	Mauro Graciale	Episode: "Don We Now Our Gay Apparel"
1995	Heat	Timmons	Feature film
1996	Cybill	Bill Witlow	Episode: "Bringing Home the Bacon"
1996	Lois & Clark: The New Adventures of Superman	Leo Nunk	Episode: "Swear to God, This Time We're Not Kidding"
1996	Touched by an Angel	Allan Pound	Episode: "The Sky Is Falling"
1997	Star Trek: Deep Space Nine	Deyos	Episode: "By Inferno's Light"
1998–99	JAG	Art Scherer	Recurring role (3 episodes)
2001	Surviving Gilligan's Island	Director #1	Television film
2003	Return to the Batcave: The Misadventures of Adam and Burt	Robert Butler	Television film
2005	Shopgirl	Shrink	Feature film
2006	The Sopranos: Road to Respect	Additional voices	Video game
