= Another Day (TV series) =

- Genre: Sitcom
- Created by: James Komack
- Starring: David Groh; Joan Hackett; Hope Summers; Lisa Lindgren; Al Eisenmann
- Opening theme: "Just Another Day" by Paul Williams
- Country of origin: United States
- Original language: English
- No. of seasons: 1
- No. of episodes: 4

Production
- Executive producer: James Komack
- Producers: Paul Mason; George Kirgo
- Running time: 30 minutes
- Production company: The Komack Company

Original release
- Network: CBS
- Release: April 8 – April 29, 1978

The cast of Another Day. Clockwise from upper left, David Groh, Joan Hackett, Al Eisenmann, Hope Summers, and Lisa Lindgren.

Another Day is an American sitcom television series starring David Groh and Joan Hackett that aired for four episodes on CBS from April 8 to April 29, 1978.

== Synopsis ==
Don Gardner is a rather traditional middle-class man who wants to support his family on his income alone. The Gardners' finances, however, dictate that his wife Ginny also take a job, although even with her working full-time there never seems to be enough money to make ends meet. Don and Ginny have two children; teenaged Kelly is their uninhibited and outgoing daughter and 12-year-old Mark is their shy son. Don's complaining mother, Olive, lives with the family and spends most of her time criticizing everyone around her. The Gardners struggle to be a normal, middle-class family, but Olive and the children always manage to make life complicated.

== Cast ==
- David Groh as Don Gardner
- Joan Hackett as Ginny Gardner
- Hope Summers as Olive Gardner
- Lisa Lindgren as Kelly Gardner
- Al Eisenmann as Mark Gardner

== Production ==
James Komack created Another Day and was its executive producer. Paul Mason and George Kirgo produced it. Episode directors were Burt Brinckerhoff, Hal Cooper, Nick Havinga, and Gary Shimokawa. Episode writers were Charlie Hauck, Dinah Kirgo, Julie Kirgo, Carl Kleinschmitt, Lynn Phillips, and Bill Taub. Paul Williams wrote and sang the show's theme song.

== Broadcast history ==
Another Day premiered on April 8, 1978. It drew very low ratings, and CBS cancelled it after the broadcast of its fourth and final episode on April 29, 1978. It aired on Saturday at 9:00 p.m. throughout its brief run.

== Episodes ==
No.	Title	Original release date
1	"A Couple Drinks with the Girls"	April 8, 1978
Ginny returns to work to help with the family finances, and Don resents it—and then Ginny comes home drunk from an office party. Dean Lawrence guest-stars.
2	"Room for One More"	April 15, 1978
Don tries to talk Ginny into having another baby so she will quit her job.
3	"Episode 1.3"	April 22, 1978
Kelly falls in love, and Don is nervous about it.
4	"The Audition"	April 29, 1978
Kelly auditions for a television commercial, and the competition at the audition turns her into a nasty brat.
