= The Irish Whiskey Rebellion =

1972 film directed by Chester Erskine

- Directed by: Chester Erskine
- Written by: Leslie Waller
- Based on: "A Change in The Wind" (1969) by Leslie Waller
- Produced by: George Manasse
- Starring: William Devane; Anne Meara; Richard Mulligan, John Pleshette; David Groh; Stephen Joyce; William Challee
- Cinematography: Minervino Rojas
- Music by: Leonard Rosenman
- Production companies: GSF Productions, Inc.
- Distributed by: Cinerama Releasing Corporation
- Release date: October 1972
- Running time: 93 minutes
- Country: United States
- Language: English

The Irish Whiskey Rebellion (also known as A Change in The Wind) is a 1972 crime drama, directed by Chester Erskine and starring William Devane, Anne Meara, Richard Mulligan, John Pleshette, David Groh, Stephen Joyce, and William Challee. It is based on a 1969 novel by Leslie Waller "A Change in The Wind." The film is set in Prohibition Era and shows a story of an IRA member who tries to land a shipment of contraband whiskey.

== Plot ==
The film is set in 1927 on Fire Island. IRA veteran Harry Regan (Stephen Joyce) arrives to the US and wants to arrange a shipment of contraband whiskey to support the struggle for independence. He is being chased by a brutal Coast Guard Lt. Commander Ashley (William Devane) and confronts local crime syndicate member Maxie (David Groh).

== Production ==
The Irish Whiskey Rebellion was filmed in September—early November 1971 on Fire Island, New York, mostly in Saltaire, Long Cove and Skunk Hollow. It is believed that director Chester Erskine used the pseudonym of "J. C. Works" on the film's credit (as author). The film featured newsreel footage from the 1916-1921 period in Ireland and of events associated with Charles Lindbergh's Atlantic crossing.

== Critical response ==
TV Guide gave the film 2 starts out five with the verdict “Devane's performance is up to his usual high standard, and the period atmosphere is believable; but that's still not enough to raise the film above mediocrity”.
