= Lisa Lindgren (American actress) =

American actress

- Born: Lisa Lindgren Farrer; July 28, 1960
- Died: July 15, 2005 (aged 44)
- Occupation: Actress

Lisa Lindgren Farrer (July 28, 1960 – July 15, 2005) was an American actress.

== Career ==
Lindgren played Kelly Gardner in the short-lived CBS situation comedy Another Day in 1978, Kathy Summers in the daytime serial General Hospital in 1980, and Cindy Spooner in Hill Street Blues in 1981. She also lent her voice to the character Tess Darret in the 1984 CBS cartoon series Pole Position. She also made guest appearances on CHiPs, Joanie Loves Chachi, Alice, and The Waltons.

== Filmography ==
=== Film ===
Year	Title	Role	Notes
1982	Young Doctors in Love	Usherette #1	

=== Television ===
Year	Title	Role	Notes
1978	Another Day	Kelly Gardner	4 episodes
1978	The Waltons	Tanya	Episode: "The Beau"
1981	Hill Street Blues	Cindy Spooner	Episode: "Fecund Hand Rose"
1981	Crash Island	Kris	Television film
1981	General Hospital	Kathy Summers	3 episodes
1982	Alice	Sara Brown	Episode: "Give My Regrets to Broadway"
1982	Joanie Loves Chachi	Judi	Episode: "College Days"
1982	Seven Brides for Seven Brothers	Cheryl	Episode: "Dreams"
1983	CHiPs	Gemini	Episode: "Fast Company"
1983	Ryan's Four	Nurse Becker	Episode: "Couples"
1984	Simon & Simon	Melissa Shelley	Episode: "Dear Lovesick"
1984	Pole Position	Tess Darret	13 episodes
