= David Groh =

American actor (1939–2008)

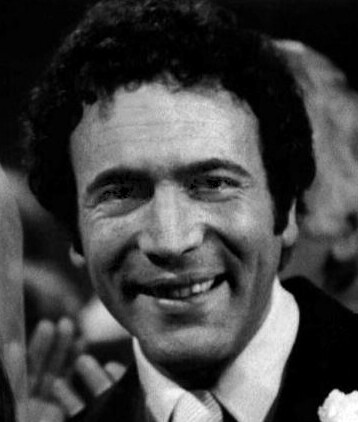
- Groh as Joe Gerard in Rhoda, 1974
- Born: David Lawrence Groh; May 21, 1939; Brooklyn, New York, U.S.
- Died: February 12, 2008 (aged 68); Los Angeles, California, U.S.
- Occupation: Actor
- Years active: 1969–2008
- Spouse(s): Denise Arsenault (1984 – ?; annulled); Karla Pergande (1988 – ?; divorced); Kristin Andersen (? – 2008; his death)
- Children: 1

David Lawrence Groh (May 21, 1939 – February 12, 2008) was an American actor best known for his portrayal of Joe Gerard in the 1970s television series Rhoda, opposite Valerie Harper.

== Early life and career ==
Groh was born in Brooklyn, the son of Mildred and Benjamin Groh. He had a sister, Marilyn. He attended Brooklyn Technical High School, then enrolled at Brown University in Providence, Rhode Island, where he graduated with a degree in English literature.

He performed with the American Shakespeare Theatre, then went to Great Britain to attend the London Academy of Music and Dramatic Art on a Fulbright scholarship, and served in the United States Army from 1963 to 1964. On his return to New York City, he studied at The Actors Studio. He made his television debut in silent walk-on parts in two episodes of the Gothic daytime soap opera Dark Shadows on ABC in 1968, but did not garner fame until Rhoda.

== Career ==
Groh co-starred in the sitcom Rhoda in which he played Joe Gerard, a New York City building demolition company owner who met and married Rhoda Morgenstern, the best friend of Mary Richards from CBS's The Mary Tyler Moore Show. The show premiered September 9, 1974, and Joe and Rhoda married in the seventh episode. The network gave the marriage much advance publicity, and the episode proved a ratings blockbuster, drawing some 50 million viewers to become one of television's most-watched single episodes.

In season three, the couple separated and later divorced. Groh was dropped to recurring status during season three, and he made only a few guest appearances that season before being written out of the show entirely. However, this change was not embraced by the show's audience and ratings began to decline sharply. Rhoda was eventually canceled in the fall of 1978. Groh starred in his own series, opposite Joan Hackett, in the short-lived Another Day, in the spring of 1978 and went on to make his Broadway theatre debut in Neil Simon's Chapter Two.

From 1983 to 1985, Groh played D.L. Brock in the ABC soap opera General Hospital, leaving the show to appear in the off Broadway play Be Happy for Me (1986). The New York Times drama critic Frank Rich found Groh "completely convincing as the brash gold-chain-and-bikini-clad Lothario". Other New York City theater credits include Road Show (1987), and The Twilight of the Golds (1993).

On television, Groh appeared in guest roles on such series as Buck Rogers in the 25th Century, L.A. Law, Baywatch, Law & Order, Murder, She Wrote, Melrose Place, The X-Files, and JAG. His film career includes appearances in Two-Minute Warning (1976), Smash-Up on Interstate 5 (1976), Victory at Entebbe (1976), A Hero Ain't Nothin' but a Sandwich (1978), The Dream Merchants (1980), The Return of Superfly (1990), Get Shorty (1995), and several independent films.

== Personal life ==
Groh was a serious collector of antique furniture and folk art, much of which he kept in a second home in Connecticut. He mainly resided in Santa Monica, California, where he lived with his third wife, Kristin, and his son Spencer.

== Death ==
Groh died of kidney cancer at Cedars-Sinai Medical Center in Los Angeles, on February 12, 2008, at the age of 68.

== Filmography ==
Year	Title	Role	Notes
1970	Colpo rovente	Don Carbo	
1972	The Irish Whiskey Rebellion	Maxie	
1976	Two-Minute Warning	Al	
1976	Smash-Up on Interstate 5	Dale	TV movie
1976	Victory at Entebbe	Benjamin Wise	TV movie
1978	A Hero Ain't Nothin' but a Sandwich	Cohen	
1980	The Dream Merchants	Rocco Salvatore	2 episodes
1983–1985	General Hospital	D.L. Brock	Unknown episodes
1986	Hotshot	Jerry Norton	
1990	Law & Order	Dr. Jacob Lowenstein	Episode: "Indifference"
1990	The Return of Superfly	Inspector Wolinski	
1994	The Stoned Age	Dad	
1994	Law & Order	Judge Joel Thayer	Episode: "Censure"
1995	Get Shorty	Buddy Lufkin	Uncredited
1996	White Cargo	Tony	
1997	Most Wanted	TV Station Manager	
1997	Acts of Betrayal	Martin Crispin	
1997	JAG	Chief Petty Officer 'Dad' Harridan	Episode: "Heroes"
1997	Swimsuit: The Movie	Dylan Perry	
1998	Spoiler	Uncle Hutchy	
1999	Walker, Texas Ranger	Vince Termin	1 episode
1999	Every Dog Has Its Day	Jack Sr.	
2000	Blowback	Capt. Barnett	
2001	The Confidence Man	The Lieutenant	
2004	Law & Order	Dr. Jacob Lowenstein	Episode: "Fixed"
2005	Crazylove	Mr. Santalucci	
2006	Late Night Girls	Alan	
2008	Mala wielka milosc	Used Car Dealer	
2008	Evilution	Dr. Tyler	
2010	Jelly	Robert Gills	(final film role)
