= Lorenzo Music =

American actor, producer, and writer (1937–2001)

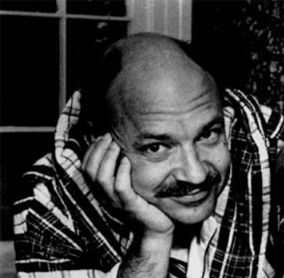
- Music in 1976
- Born: Gerald David Music; May 2, 1937; New York City, U.S.
- Died: August 4, 2001 (aged 64); Los Angeles, California, U.S.
- Other name: L. Music
- Education: University of Minnesota Duluth
- Occupations: Actor; performer; writer; producer
- Years active: 1958–2001
- Spouse: Henrietta Music (m. 1959)
- Children: 4
- Relatives: Carla Lalli Music (daughter-in-law)

Gerald David "Lorenzo" Music (May 2, 1937 – August 4, 2001) was an American actor, composer, musician, performer, writer and producer. Music began his career in the 1960s with his wife, Henrietta, forming the comedy duo Gerald and His Hen. He then became a writer and a regular performer on the controversial CBS variety show The Smothers Brothers Comedy Hour. In the 1970s, Music co-created the sitcom The Bob Newhart Show with David Davis and composed its theme music with his wife. He also wrote episodes for The Mary Tyler Moore Show and Rhoda, and got a major voiceover role for playing the unseen, but often heard, Carlton the Doorman in Rhoda. Music gained fame in the 1980s for voicing Jim Davis's comic strip character Garfield in twelve animated specials, and later an animated series, video games, and commercials. His nostalgic, drawling voice as Garfield was imitated by later actors after his death in 2001.

== Early life and career ==
Gerald David Music was born on May 2, 1937, in Brooklyn, New York City to Harry and Sophie (née Nessell) Music. He was six years old when his family moved to Duluth, Minnesota because of his father's job at one of the shipyards. His parents later divorced. He was a student at Central High School and then at the University of Minnesota Duluth. Music met his wife, Henrietta, in college at its Theatre Arts Department. Together, they had four children and formed a comedy duo, Gerald and His Hen, performing together for eight years, even performing at a USO show in Japan.

== Career ==
=== Writer ===
Music became a writer and a regular performer on The Smothers Brothers Comedy Hour from 1967 to 1969 and won an Emmy Award for writing. He was a writer and story editor on The Mary Tyler Moore Show, and he co-created The Bob Newhart Show with his writing partner, David Davis. The show ran on CBS from 1972 to 1978. He also co-wrote the theme song to the show with his wife.

Music continued writing for The Mary Tyler Moore Show spin-off Rhoda, which he co-developed with Davis. While casting Rhoda, the producers were looking for a voice actor to play the part of Carlton, the comically unseen doorman. Music had no interest in being an actor, but the producers loved his sleepy, husky voice and offered him that role, which made his voice recognizable to a worldwide television audience. The character was popular enough to warrant a one-off single in 1975 called "Who Is It?" (b/w "The Girl in 510", United Artists UA-XW643-X), which became a regional hit. Music also co-produced and co-wrote a 1980 animated special titled Carlton Your Doorman, which won an Emmy Award. Though it was a pilot episode, CBS did not pick it up as a series.

In 1976, Lorenzo and Henrietta were given the opportunity to host a syndicated television variety show of their own. The Lorenzo and Henrietta Music Show was produced at a time when there was a glut of television variety shows, but it did not last. In 1983, Music voiced Ralph the All-Purpose Animal in the stop-motion animated film Twice Upon a Time.

=== Garfield ===
In the 1980s, Jim Davis's Garfield was the most popular comic strip in America since Charles M. Schulz's Peanuts. Compilation books and merchandising of the strip were topping best-seller lists, and Davis decided to develop an animated television special. The producers were hiring someone to voice the titular character in the strip, who was a fat, lazy, sarcastic, and lasagna-loving cat. The audition attracted several famed vocal talents, including Sterling Holloway, the voice of Winnie the Pooh. After one audition, Music was immediately cast as the voice of Garfield. Davis responded by saying: "I looked at the room full of [voice] actors, and then in the corner I saw Lorenzo, quietly licking himself". Music would serve as the voice of Garfield in all twelve specials, an animated series, video games, and commercials until his death in 2001.

=== Other work ===
Music also voiced characters for the animated series Pac-Man, Adventures of the Gummi Bears, Fluppy Dogs, The Real Ghostbusters, Pound Puppies, TaleSpin, and Darkwing Duck. After Garfield and Friends ended in 1994, Music retired from voice acting for animation.

Music did voice-overs for many commercials for prime-time TV, such as Larry the Crash Test Dummy in the "You Could Learn a Lot from a Dummy" public safety announcements sponsored by the U.S. Department of Transportation and for Florida grapefruit juice, a lesser-known series of commercials extolling Florida agriculture as opposed to the more popular "Florida orange juice" commercials. These commercials were animated by Jim Jinkins, and featured a prototype of the titular main character of Jinkins's later television series Doug.

In keeping with his beliefs in Subud and its emphasis on charity, Music frequently volunteered his time on a suicide hotline. Music recalled that sometimes a caller would change his tone: "I am bankrupt, my wife ran off with another man... Hey, you sound just like that cat on TV!"

Music's voice could be heard on Stan Freberg Presents the United States of America Volume Two, released as a CD by Rhino Records. Music appeared on the album as James Madison and Robert E. Lee. He also appeared as an intercom announcer on an episode of The Drew Carey Show. Music served as the voice-over for commercials for Ore-Ida Potatoes and Fruit and Cream Strawberry Twinkies. He later served as the pitchman for Ruggles Ice Cream.

== Personal life ==
Music was married to composer/writer Henrietta Music for forty-two years. Together they had four children.

== Death and legacy ==
Music died from complications related to lung and bone cancer on August 4, 2001, at the age of 64. His body was cremated, and his ashes were scattered at sea.

After Music's passing, Frank Welker took over as the voice of Garfield in three fully CGI films, an animated series, and the Nickelodeon crossover fighting video game All-Star Brawl. Bill Murray also voiced Garfield in two live-action films. Interestingly, Music had voiced Murray’s character, Peter Venkman, in the first two seasons of The Real Ghostbusters before being replaced by Full House star Dave Coulier. In that same series, Welker also voiced Ray Stantz and Slimer. In 2024, Chris Pratt voiced Garfield in a reimagined CGI animated film, which departed from Music’s original vocal style of the character.

== Filmography ==
=== Film ===
Year	Title	Role	Notes
1976	Nickelodeon	Mullins	
1980	Oh Heavenly Dog	Carlton	
1983	Twice Upon a Time	Ralph the All-Purpose Animal (voice)	
1986	The Adventures of the American Rabbit	Ping (voice)	

=== Television ===
Year	Title	Role	Notes
1967–1969	The Smothers Brothers Comedy Hour	Regular Performer	50 episodes
1974–1978	Rhoda	Carlton the Doorman	82 episodes
1975	Tattletales	Himself/Contestant	6 episodes
1976	The Lorenzo and Henrietta Music Show	Himself/host	35 episodes
1996	The Drew Carey Show	Store Announcer	Episode: "There Is No Scientific Name for a Show About God"

=== Animation ===
Year	Title	Role	Notes
1980	Carlton Your Doorman	Carlton the Doorman	TV pilot episode
1982	Here Comes Garfield	Garfield	Television special
1983	Garfield on the Town	Garfield	Television special
1983	Pac-Man	Super-Pac	4 episodes
1984	Garfield in the Rough	Garfield	Television special
1985	Garfield in Disguise	Garfield	Television special
1985	The GLO Friends Save Christmas	Moose	Television film
1985–1991	Disney's Adventures of the Gummi Bears	Tummi Gummi, Knight, Man, Additional voices	60 episodes
1985–1999	The Incredible Crash Dummies	Larry the Crash Test Dummy	PSAs
1986	Garfield in Paradise	Garfield	Television special
1986	Fluppy Dogs	Ozzie	Television film
1986–1987	The Real Ghostbusters	Peter Venkman	Main-role; 78 episodes; first season and syndication run
1987	Garfield Goes Hollywood	Garfield	Television special
1987	Pound Puppies	Teensy	Episode: "Little Big Dog/The Bright Eyes Mob"
1987	The Jetsons	Florist	Episode: "The Odd Pod"
1987	A Garfield Christmas Special	Garfield	Television special
1988–1994	Garfield and Friends	Garfield, Charlie, Devil Garfield, Angel Garfield, Additional voices	Main-role; 121 episodes
1988	Garfield: His 9 Lives	Garfield	Television special
1988–1989	Fantastic Max	Additional voices	3 episodes
1989	Garfield's Babes and Bullets	Garfield	Television special
1989	Garfield's Thanksgiving	Garfield	Main-role; TV special
1990	Cartoon All-Stars to the Rescue	Garfield	Cameo; Television special
1990	Garfield's Feline Fantasies	Garfield, Lance Sterling	Television special
1990–1991	TaleSpin	Sgt. Dunder	6 episodes
1991	Garfield Gets a Life	Garfield	Television special
1991	Darkwing Duck	Spider, Mole	2 episodes

=== Video games ===
Year	Title	Role
2000	Garfield's Mad About Cats	Garfield

=== Radio ===
Year	Title	Role	Notes
1998	Adventures in Odyssey	Mr. Smith	Episode: "A Stranger Among Us"

== Production credits ==
=== Writer ===
Year	Title	Notes
1967–1969	The Smothers Brothers Comedy Hour	54 episodes
1969	The Leslie Uggams Show	10 episodes
1969–1970	Love, American Style	3 episodes
1970–1971	The Mary Tyler Moore Show	8 episodes
1972–1978	The Bob Newhart Show	Created by (142 episodes); Writer (5 episodes)
1974–1978	Rhoda	2 episodes
1976	The Lorenzo and Henrietta Music Show	Main writer
1976	The New Lorenzo Music Show	Teleplay
1980	Carlton Your Doorman	
1983	Garfield on the Town	TV special
1994	De Sylvia Millecam Show	6 episodes

=== Producer ===
Year	Title	Notes
1972–1975	The Bob Newhart Show	Executive producer (51 episodes); Producer (6 episodes)
1974–1975	Rhoda	33 episodes
1976	The Lorenzo and Henrietta Music Show	Executive producer
1976	The New Lorenzo Music Show	Executive producer
1980	Carlton Your Doorman	

=== Consultant ===
Year	Title	Notes
1970–1972	The Mary Tyler Moore Show	Story consultant (24 episodes); Assistant to producers (24 episodes)
1975	Rhoda	Executive consultant (5 episodes)
1983	Garfield on the Town	Consultant

Preceded by Lou Rawls (singing voice in Here Comes Garfield)	Voice of Garfield the Cat; 1982–2001	Succeeded by Bill Murray
Preceded by Bill Murray	Voice of Dr. Peter Venkman; 1986–1988	Succeeded by Dave Coulier
