= David Davis (TV producer) =

American producer and writer (1936–2022)

- Born: August 5, 1936; Brooklyn, New York City, U.S.
- Died: November 4, 2022 (aged 86); Los Angeles, California, U.S.
- Education: University of California
- Occupations: Television producer; television writer
- Years active: 1962–1994
- Notable work: The Bob Newhart Show; Taxi
- Spouse: Joann Leeson (div. 1972)
- Partner: Julie Kavner (1976–2022)
- Children: 2

David Davis (August 5, 1936 – November 4, 2022) was an American television producer and television writer. He co-created the sitcoms The Bob Newhart Show (with Lorenzo Music) and Taxi (with James L. Brooks, Stan Daniels, and Ed. Weinberger). He also wrote, produced, and developed the sitcom Rhoda, co-starring his partner Julie Kavner. He also wrote and produced The Mary Tyler Moore Show, off of which Rhoda was spun. In 1979, he won a Primetime Emmy Award for his producing work on Taxi.

== Personal life and death ==
Davis was born in Brooklyn on August 5, 1936. His father, Phil Davis, was a writer for the game shows Truth or Consequences and This Is Your Life. He moved to Los Angeles during his childhood, and attended the University of California, Los Angeles, where he studied film.

Davis had two daughters, Samantha and Abigail, from his marriage to Joann Leeson, which ended in divorce in 1972. Davis was in a relationship with actress Julie Kavner from 1976 until his death. They met on the set of Rhoda, a series in which Kavner co-starred. At the time of his death, it was reported that Kavner was his wife but this remains unconfirmed. In his tribute to Davis on Twitter, James L. Brooks stated that Davis and Kavner were married.

Davis died in Los Angeles on November 4, 2022, at the age of 86. The Simpsons episode "From Beer to Paternity" was dedicated to his memory.

== Filmography ==
=== Television ===
Television series writing credits
Series	Episode	Air date
Bob Hope Presents the Chrysler Theatre	"The Timothy Heist"	October 30, 1964
Love, American Style	"Love and Who"	October 20, 1969
Love, American Style	"Love and the Millionaires"	March 13, 1970
Love, American Style	"Love and the Trip"	November 13, 1970
Love, American Style	"Love and the Pen Pals"	November 27, 1970
The Mary Tyler Moore Show	"The Snow Must Go On"	November 7, 1970
The Mary Tyler Moore Show	"1040 or Fight"	November 28, 1970
The Mary Tyler Moore Show	"The Boss Isn't Coming to Dinner"	February 13, 1971
The Mary Tyler Moore Show	"I Am Curious-Cooper"	September 25, 1971
The Mary Tyler Moore Show	"A Girl's Best Mother Is Not Her Friend"	October 16, 1971
The Mary Tyler Moore Show	"Don't Break the Chain"	November 20, 1971
The Mary Tyler Moore Show	"Ted Over Heels"	December 18, 1971
The Bob Newhart Show	"Fly the Unfriendly Skies"	September 16, 1972
The Bob Newhart Show	"Tennis, Emily?"	September 30, 1972
The Bob Newhart Show	"P-I-L-O-T"	November 18, 1972
The Bob Newhart Show	"His Busiest Season"	December 23, 1972
The Bob Newhart Show	"A Home Is Not Necessarily a House"	February 10, 1973
Rhoda	"Joe"	September 9, 1974
Rhoda	"Rhoda's Wedding"	October 28, 1974
Taxi	"Like Father, Like Daughter"	September 12, 1978

=== Film ===
- Hook, Line & Sinker (1969)
- Cindy (1978)
