= List of filmography and awards of Mary Tyler Moore =

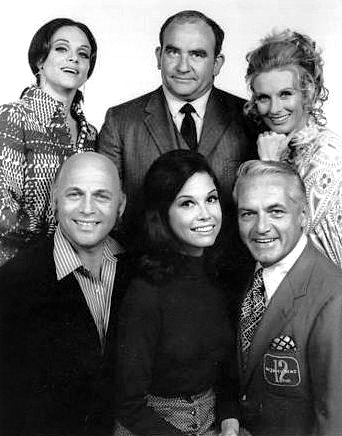
The original cast of The Mary Tyler Moore Show, 1970. Top: Valerie Harper (Rhoda), Ed Asner (Lou Grant), Cloris Leachman (Phyllis). Bottom: Gavin MacLeod (Murray), Moore, Ted Knight (Ted).

Mary Tyler Moore (December 29, 1936 – January 25, 2017) was an American actress, known for her roles in the television sitcoms The Mary Tyler Moore Show (1970–77), in which she starred as Mary Richards, a thirtyish single woman who worked as a local news producer in Minneapolis, and The Dick Van Dyke Show (1961–66), in which she played Laura Petrie, a former dancer turned Westchester homemaker, wife and mother. Her notable film work includes 1967's Thoroughly Modern Millie and 1980's Ordinary People, in which she played a role that was very different from the television characters she had portrayed, and for which she was nominated for an Academy Award for Best Actress.

== Television ==
Year	Title	Role	Notes	Ref.
1957	The Eddie Fisher Show	Dancer	2 episodes	
1959	The George Burns Show	Linda Knox	Episode: "The Landlord's Daughter"	
1959	Schlitz Playhouse of Stars	Student #1	Episode: "Ivy League"	
1959	Steve Canyon	Second Spanish Girl	Episode: "Strike Force" (as Mary Moore)	
1959	Richard Diamond, Private Detective	Sam	7 episodes	
1959	Bourbon Street Beat	Laura Montgomery / Elyse Brown Picard	2 episodes	
1959–60	77 Sunset Strip	Laura Chandler / Marie Drew / Girl	2 episodes	
1959–60	Riverboat	Lily Belle de Lesseps / Brunette Girl in Coach	2 episodes	
1959	Bronco	Marilee Goddard	Episode: "Flight from an Empire"	
1960	Bachelor Father	Joanne Sutton / Huey's Sister	2 episodes	
1960	Checkmate	Millie	Episode: "Lady on the Brink"	
1960	Johnny Staccato	Bonnie Howard	Episode: "The Mask of Jason"	
1960	Overland Trail	Joan Ransom	Episode: "All the O'Mara Horses"	
1960	The Tab Hunter Show	Brunette	Episode: "One Blonde Too Many"	
1960	Wanted Dead or Alive	Sophie Anderson	Episode: "The Twain Shall Meet"	
1960	The Millionaire	Linda	Episode: "Millionaire Vance Ludlow"	
1960	The Deputy	Amy Collins	Episode: "Day of Fear"	
1960–62	Thriller	Sherry Smith / Mary Snyder	2 episodes	
1960–61	Hawaiian Eye	Peggy / Joan White / Vanessa Kinard / Susan Hart	4 episodes	
1961	Stagecoach West	Linda Anson	Episode: "The Dead Don't Cry"	
1961	Surfside 6	Kathy Murlow	Episode: "Inside Job"	
1961	Lock-Up	Nan Havens	Episode: "The Case of Nan Havens"	
1961	The Aquanauts	Dana March	Episode: "Killers in Paradise"	
1962	Straightaway	Myra Venable	Episode: "Sounds of Fury"	
1961–66	The Dick Van Dyke Show	Laura Petrie / Laura Meeker	158 episodes	
1969	Dick Van Dyke and the Other Woman	Herself	Television special	
1969	Run a Crooked Mile	Elizabeth Sutton	Television film	
1970–77	The Mary Tyler Moore Show	Mary Richards	168 episodes	
1974–77	Rhoda	Mary Richards	6 episodes	
1974	The American Parade	Narrator	Episode: "We the Women"	
1975–76	Phyllis	Mary Richards	2 episodes	
1976	Mary's Incredible Dream	Angel / Devil / Woman	Television special	
1978	Mary	Host / Skit characters	3 episodes	
1978	First, You Cry	Betty Rollin	Television film	
1979	The Mary Tyler Moore Hour	Mary McKinnon	11 episodes	
1979	Password Plus	Herself	Game Show Contestant / Celebrity Guest Star	
1984	Heartsounds	Martha Weinman Lear	Television film	
1985	Finnegan Begin Again	Liz DeHaan	Television film	
1985–86	Mary	Mary Brenner	13 episodes	
1987	Shalom Sesame	Herself	2 episodes	
1988	Lincoln	Mary Todd Lincoln	Television miniseries	
1988	Annie McGuire	Annie McGuire	11 episodes	
1990	The Last Best Year	Wendy Haller	Television film	
1990	Thanksgiving Day	Paula Schloss	Television film	
1991	Mary Tyler Moore: The 20th Anniversary Show	Herself / Host	Television special	
1993	Stolen Babies	Georgia Tann	Television film	
1994	Frasier	Marjorie (voice)	Episode: "Frasier Crane's Day Off"	
1995	New York News	Louise Felcott	13 episodes	
1996	Stolen Memories: Secrets from the Rose Garden	Jessica	Television film	
1996	Ellen	Herself	2 episodes	
1997	Payback	Kathryn Stanfill	Television film	
1997	The Naked Truth	Catherine Wilde	4 episodes	
1998	Reno Finds Her Mom	Herself	Television special	
1999	King of the Hill	Reverend Karen Stroup (voice)	Episode: "Revenge of the Lutefisk"	
2000	Mary and Rhoda	Mary Richards-Cronin	Television film	
2000	Good as Gold	Michael's Mother	Television film	
2001	Like Mother, Like Son: The Strange Story of Sante and Kenny Kimes	Sante Kimes / Eva Guerrero	Television film	
2001	The Ellen Show	Aunt Mary	Episode: "Ellen's First Christmess"	
2002	The Mary Tyler Moore Reunion	Herself / Host	Television special	
2002	Miss Lettie and Me	Lettie Anderson	Television film	
2003	The Gin Game	Fonsia Dorsey	Television film	
2003	Blessings	Lydia Blessing	Television film	
2004	The Dick Van Dyke Show Revisited	Laura Petrie	Television film	
2005	Snow Wonder	Aunt Lula	Television film	
2006	That '70s Show	Christine St. George	3 episodes	
2008	Lipstick Jungle	Joyce Connor	2 episodes	
2011–13	Hot in Cleveland	Diane	2 episodes (final TV role)	

== Filmography ==
Year	Title	Role	Notes	Ref.
1961	X-15	Pamela Stewart		
1967	Thoroughly Modern Millie	Miss Dorothy Brown		
1968	What's So Bad About Feeling Good?	Liz		
1968	Don't Just Stand There!	Martine Randall		
1969	Change of Habit	Sister Michelle		
1980	Ordinary People	Beth Jarrett	Nominated for Academy Award	
1982	Six Weeks	Charlotte Dreyfus		
1986	Just Between Friends	Holly Davis		
1996	Flirting with Disaster	Pearl Coplin		
1996	How the Toys Saved Christmas	Granny Rose (voice)		
1997	Keys to Tulsa	Cynthia Boudreau		
2000	Labor Pains	Esther Raymond		
2002	Cheats	Mrs. Stark, Principal		
2009	Against the Current	Liz's Mom	Final film role	

== Awards and nominations ==
Year	Award	Category	Nominated work	Result	Ref.
1980	Academy Awards	Best Actress	Ordinary People	Nominated	
1981	British Academy Film Awards	Best Actress in a Leading Role	Ordinary People	Nominated	
1996	Chlotrudis Awards	Best Supporting Actress	Flirting with Disaster	Won (Note: Tied with Juliette Binoche for The English Patient.)	
1980	Drama Desk Awards	Outstanding Actress in a Play	Whose Life Is It Anyway?	Nominated	
1984	Drama Desk Awards	Outstanding Play	Noises Off (Note: Produced with MTM Enterprises)	Nominated	
1986	Drama Desk Awards	Outstanding Play	Benefactors	Nominated	
1964	Golden Globe Awards	Best Television Star – Female	The Dick Van Dyke Show	Won	
1970	Golden Globe Awards	Best Television Actress – Musical or Comedy	The Mary Tyler Moore Show	Won	
1971	Golden Globe Awards	Best Television Actress – Musical or Comedy	The Mary Tyler Moore Show	Nominated	
1972	Golden Globe Awards	Best Television Actress – Musical or Comedy	The Mary Tyler Moore Show	Nominated	
1973	Golden Globe Awards	Best Television Actress – Musical or Comedy	The Mary Tyler Moore Show	Nominated	
1974	Golden Globe Awards	Best Television Actress – Musical or Comedy	The Mary Tyler Moore Show	Nominated	
1975	Golden Globe Awards	Best Actress in a Television Series – Musical or Comedy	The Mary Tyler Moore Show	Nominated	
1976	Golden Globe Awards	Best Actress in a Television Series – Musical or Comedy	The Mary Tyler Moore Show	Nominated	
1980	Golden Globe Awards	Best Actress in a Motion Picture – Drama	Ordinary People	Won	
1982	Golden Raspberry Awards	Worst Actress	Six Weeks	Nominated	
1981	Hasty Pudding Theatricals	Woman of the Year	—N/a	Won	
1980	National Society of Film Critics Awards	Best Actress	Ordinary People	2nd Place	
1980	New York Film Critics Circle Awards	Best Actress	Ordinary People	Runner-up	
1997	Online Film & Television Association Awards	Television Hall of Fame: Actors	—N/a	Inducted	
2018	Online Film & Television Association Awards	Television Hall of Fame: Productions	The Mary Tyler Moore Show	Inducted	
1963	Primetime Emmy Awards	Outstanding Continued Performance by an Actress in a Series (Lead)	The Dick Van Dyke Show	Nominated	
1964	Primetime Emmy Awards	Outstanding Continued Performance by an Actress in a Series (Lead)	The Dick Van Dyke Show	Won	
1966	Primetime Emmy Awards	Outstanding Continued Performance by an Actress in a Leading Role in a Comedy Series	The Dick Van Dyke Show	Won	
1971	Primetime Emmy Awards	Outstanding Continued Performance by an Actress in a Leading Role in a Comedy Series	The Mary Tyler Moore Show	Nominated	
1972	Primetime Emmy Awards	Outstanding Continued Performance by an Actress in a Leading Role in a Comedy Series	The Mary Tyler Moore Show	Nominated	
1973	Primetime Emmy Awards	Outstanding Continued Performance by an Actress in a Leading Role in a Comedy Series	The Mary Tyler Moore Show	Won	
1974	Primetime Emmy Awards	Best Lead Actress in a Comedy Series	The Mary Tyler Moore Show	Won	
1974	Primetime Emmy Awards	Actress of the Year – Series	The Mary Tyler Moore Show	Won	
1975	Primetime Emmy Awards	Outstanding Lead Actress in a Comedy Series	The Mary Tyler Moore Show	Nominated	
1976	Primetime Emmy Awards	Outstanding Lead Actress in a Comedy Series	The Mary Tyler Moore Show	Won	
1977	Primetime Emmy Awards	Outstanding Lead Actress in a Comedy Series	The Mary Tyler Moore Show	Nominated	
1979	Primetime Emmy Awards	Outstanding Lead Actress in a Limited Series or a Special	First, You Cry	Nominated	
1985	Primetime Emmy Awards	Outstanding Lead Actress in a Limited Series or a Special	Heartsounds	Nominated	
1988	Primetime Emmy Awards	Outstanding Lead Actress in a Miniseries or a Special	Lincoln	Nominated	
1993	Primetime Emmy Awards	Outstanding Supporting Actress in a Miniseries or a Special	Stolen Babies	Won	
2003	Satellite Awards	Best Actress in a Miniseries or a Motion Picture Made for Television	Blessings	Nominated	
2011	Screen Actors Guild Awards	Life Achievement Award	—N/a	Honored	
2000	Television Critics Association Awards	Career Achievement Award	—N/a	Nominated	
2001	Television Critics Association Awards	Career Achievement Award	—N/a	Nominated	
2007	Television Critics Association Awards	Career Achievement Award	—N/a	Won	
1986	Television Hall of Fame	Hall of Fame Award	—N/a	Inducted	
1980	Tony Awards	Special Tony Award	Whose Life Is It Anyway?	Won	
1984	Tony Awards	Best Play	Noises Off	Nominated	
1985	Tony Awards	Best Revival	A Day in the Death of Joe Egg	Won	
1986	Tony Awards	Best Play	Benefactors	Nominated	
1984	Women in Film Crystal + Lucy Awards	Crystal Award for Advocacy Retrospective	—N/a	Won	
