= List of television reunion films =

This is a list of American made-for-television films and television specials which reunited the original cast members of a defunct prime time network television series.

== Television reunion films ==
The following is a list of films reuniting the cast of a television series, reprising their original characters in a story set in that film's present day.

Year	Title	Airdate	Network	Parent series
1965	The Danny Thomas TV Family Reunion	February 14, 1965	NBC	The Danny Thomas Show (1953–1964)
1967	Make More Room For Daddy (Part of The Danny Thomas Hour)	November 6, 1967	NBC	The Danny Thomas Show (1953–1964)
1969	Dragnet 1966	January 27, 1969	NBC	Dragnet (1951–1959)
1977	Whatever Happened to Dobie Gillis?	May 10, 1977	CBS	The Many Loves of Dobie Gillis (1959–1963)
1977	Father Knows Best Reunion	May 15, 1977	NBC	Father Knows Best (1954–1960)
1977	Murder in Peyton Place	October 3, 1977	NBC	Peyton Place (1964–1969)
1977	Halloween with the New Addams Family	October 30, 1977	NBC	The Addams Family (1964–1966)
1977	Father Knows Best: Home for Christmas	December 18, 1977	NBC	Father Knows Best (1954–1960)
1978	The New Maverick	September 3, 1978	ABC	Maverick (1957–1962)
1978	Rescue from Gilligan's Island	October 14–21, 1978	NBC	Gilligan's Island (1964–1967)
1979	The Castaways on Gilligan's Island	May 3, 1979	NBC	Gilligan's Island (1964–1967)
1979	The Wild Wild West Revisited	May 9, 1979	CBS	The Wild Wild West (1965–1969)
1979	The Return of Mod Squad	May 18, 1979	ABC	The Mod Squad (1968–1973)
1980	More Wild Wild West	October 7–8, 1980	CBS	The Wild Wild West (1965–1969)
1980	The Return of Frank Cannon	November 1, 1980	CBS	Cannon (1971–1976)
1981	The Brady Girls Get Married	February 6–20, 1981	NBC	The Brady Bunch (1969–1974)
1981	The Munsters' Revenge	February 27, 1981	NBC	The Munsters (1964–1966)
1981	The Harlem Globetrotters on Gilligan's Island	May 15, 1981	NBC	Gilligan's Island (1964–1967)
1981	Return of the Beverly Hillbillies	October 6, 1981	CBS	The Beverly Hillbillies (1962–1971)
1982	A Wedding on Walton's Mountain	February 22, 1982	NBC	The Waltons (1972–1981)
1982	Eunice	March 15, 1982	CBS	The Carol Burnett Show (1967–1978)
1982	Mother's Day on Walton's Mountain	May 9, 1982	NBC	The Waltons (1972–1981)
1982	A Day for Thanks on Walton's Mountain	November 22, 1982	NBC	The Waltons (1972–1981)
1983	Still the Beaver	March 19, 1983	CBS	Leave It to Beaver (1957–1963)
1983	Return of the Man from U.N.C.L.E.: The Fifteen Years Later Affair	April 5, 1983	CBS	The Man from U.N.C.L.E. (1964–1968)
1983	Little House: Look Back to Yesterday	December 12, 1983	NBC	Little House on the Prairie (1974–1983)
1984	Little House: The Last Farewell	February 10, 1984	NBC	Little House on the Prairie (1974–1983)
1984	The Return of Marcus Welby, M.D.	May 16, 1984	ABC	Marcus Welby, M.D. (1969–1976)
1984	Little House: Bless All the Dear Children	December 17, 1984	NBC	Little House on the Prairie (1974–1983)
1985	Kojak: The Belarus File	February 16, 1985	CBS	Kojak (1973–1978)
1985	Peyton Place: The Next Generation	May 13, 1985	NBC	Peyton Place (1964–1969)
1985	I Dream of Jeannie... Fifteen Years Later	October 20, 1985	NBC	I Dream of Jeannie (1965–1970)
1985	Perry Mason Returns	December 1, 1985	NBC	Perry Mason (1957–1966)
1986	Kung Fu: The Movie	February 1, 1986	CBS	Kung Fu (1972–1975)
1986	Return to Mayberry	April 13, 1986	NBC	The Andy Griffith Show (1960–1968)
1986	Perry Mason: The Case of the Notorious Nun	May 25, 1986	NBC	Perry Mason (1957–1966)
1986	Perry Mason: The Case of the Shooting Star	November 9, 1986	NBC	Perry Mason (1957–1966)
1987	Kojak: The Price of Justice	February 21, 1987	CBS	Kojak (1973–1978)
1987	Perry Mason: The Case of the Lost Love	February 23, 1987	NBC	Perry Mason (1957–1966)
1987	Still Crazy Like a Fox	April 5, 1987	CBS	Crazy Like a Fox (1984–1986)
1987	The Return of the Six Million Dollar Man and the Bionic Woman	May 17, 1987	NBC	The Six Million Dollar Man (1974–1978); The Bionic Woman (1976–1978)
1987	Perry Mason: The Case of the Sinister Spirit	May 24, 1987	NBC	Perry Mason (1957–1966)
1987	Gunsmoke: Return to Dodge	September 26, 1987	CBS	Gunsmoke (1955–1975)
1987	Perry Mason: The Case of the Murdered Madam	October 4, 1987	NBC	Perry Mason (1957–1966)
1987	Eight Is Enough: A Family Reunion	October 18, 1987	NBC	Eight Is Enough (1977–1981)
1987	Perry Mason: The Case of the Scandalous Scoundrel	November 15, 1987	NBC	Perry Mason (1957–1966)
1988	The Return of Ben Casey	February 13, 1988	Syndication	Ben Casey (1961–1966)
1988	Bring Me the Head of Dobie Gillis	February 22, 1988	CBS	The Many Loves of Dobie Gillis (1959–1963)
1988	Perry Mason: The Case of the Avenging Ace	February 28, 1988	NBC	Perry Mason (1957–1966)
1988	Bonanza: The Next Generation	March 23, 1988	CBS	Bonanza (1959–1973)
1988	Perry Mason: The Case of the Lady in the Lake	May 15, 1988	NBC	Perry Mason (1957–1966)
1988	The Incredible Hulk Returns	May 22, 1988	NBC	The Incredible Hulk (1978–1982)
1988	A Very Brady Christmas	December 18, 1988	CBS	The Brady Bunch (1969–1974)
1988	Marcus Welby, M.D.: A Holiday Affair	December 19, 1988	NBC	Marcus Welby, M.D. (1969–1976)
1989	Perry Mason: The Case of the Lethal Lesson	February 12, 1989	NBC	Perry Mason (1957–1966)
1989	Get Smart, Again!	February 26, 1989	ABC	Get Smart (1965–1970)
1989	Perry Mason: The Case of the Musical Murder	April 9, 1989	NBC	Perry Mason (1957–1966)
1989	Bionic Showdown: The Six Million Dollar Man and the Bionic Woman	April 30, 1989	NBC	The Six Million Dollar Man (1974–1978); The Bionic Woman (1976–1978)
1989	The Trial of the Incredible Hulk	May 7, 1989	NBC	The Incredible Hulk (1978–1982)
1989	An Eight Is Enough Wedding	October 15, 1989	NBC	Eight Is Enough (1977–1981)
1989	Kojak: Ariana	November 4, 1989	ABC	Kojak (1973–1978)
1989	The Return of Sam McCloud	November 12, 1989	CBS	McCloud (1970–1977)
1989	Perry Mason: The Case of the All-Star Assassin	November 19, 1989	NBC	Perry Mason (1957–1966)
1989	Kojak: Fatal Flaw	November 30, 1989	ABC	Kojak (1973–1978)
1990	Kojak: Flowers for Matty	January 4, 1990	ABC	Kojak (1973–1978)
1990	Perry Mason: The Case of the Poisoned Pen	January 21, 1990	NBC	Perry Mason (1957–1966)
1990	Kojak: It's Always Something	February 3, 1990	ABC	Kojak (1973–1978)
1990	The Love Boat: A Valentine Voyage	February 12, 1990	CBS	The Love Boat (1977–1986)
1990	The Death of the Incredible Hulk	February 18, 1990	NBC	The Incredible Hulk (1978–1982)
1990	Perry Mason: The Case of the Desperate Deception	March 11, 1990	NBC	Perry Mason (1957–1966)
1990	Gunsmoke: The Last Apache	March 18, 1990	CBS	Gunsmoke (1955–1975)
1990	Kojak: None so Blind	April 7, 1990	ABC	Kojak (1973–1978)
1990	Return to Green Acres	May 18, 1990	CBS	Green Acres (1965–1971)
1990	Perry Mason: The Case of the Silenced Singer	May 20, 1990	NBC	Perry Mason (1957–1966)
1990	Perry Mason: The Case of the Defiant Daughter	September 30, 1990	NBC	Perry Mason (1957–1966)
1991	Perry Mason: The Case of the Ruthless Reporter	January 6, 1991	NBC	Perry Mason (1957–1966)
1991	Perry Mason: The Case of the Maligned Mobster	February 11, 1991	NBC	Perry Mason (1957–1966)
1991	Perry Mason: The Case of the Glass Coffin	May 14, 1991	NBC	Perry Mason (1957–1966)
1991	Knight Rider 2000	May 19, 1991	NBC	Knight Ridder (1982–1986)
1991	Perry Mason: The Case of the Fatal Fashion	September 24, 1991	NBC	Perry Mason (1957–1966)
1991	I Still Dream of Jeannie	October 20, 1991	NBC	I Dream of Jeannie (1965–1970)
1991	Dynasty: The Reunion	October 20–22, 1991	ABC	Dynasty (1981–1989)
1991	The Return of Eliot Ness	November 10, 1991	NBC	The Untouchables (1959–1963)
1992	Gunsmoke: To the Last Man	January 10, 1992	CBS	Gunsmoke (1955–1975)
1992	Back to the Streets of San Francisco	January 27, 1992	NBC	The Streets of San Francisco (1972–1977)
1992	Perry Mason: The Case of the Fatal Framing	March 1, 1992	NBC	Perry Mason (1957–1966)
1992	Perry Mason: The Case of the Reckless Romeo	May 5, 1992	NBC	Perry Mason (1957–1966)
1992	Perry Mason: The Case of the Heartbroken Bride	October 30, 1992	NBC	Perry Mason (1957–1966)
1993	Perry Mason: The Case of the Skin-Deep Scandal	February 19, 1993	NBC	Perry Mason (1957–1966)
1993	Jonny's Golden Quest	April 4, 1993	USA Network	Jonny Quest (1965–1965)
1993	The Return of Ironside	May 4, 1993	NBC	Ironside (1967–1975)
1993	Gunsmoke: The Long Ride	May 8, 1993	CBS	Gunsmoke (1955–1975)
1993	Perry Mason: The Case of the Telltale Talk Show Host	May 21, 1993	NBC	Perry Mason (1957–1966)
1993	Spencer: Ceremony	July 22, 1993	Lifetime	Spenser: For Hire (1985–1988)
1993	The Odd Couple Together Again	September 24, 1993	CBS	The Odd Couple (1970–1975)
1993	Hart to Hart Returns	November 5, 1993	NBC	Hart to Hart (1979–1984)
1993	A Walton Thanksgiving Reunion	November 21, 1993	CBS	The Waltons (1972–1981)
1993	Bonanza: The Return	November 28, 1993	NBC	Bonanza (1959–1973)
1993	Perry Mason: The Case of the Killer Kiss	November 29, 1993	NBC	Perry Mason (1957–1966)
1994	Spencer: Pale Kings and Princes	January 2, 1994	Lifetime	Spenser: For Hire (1985–1988)
1994	I Spy Returns	February 3, 1994	CBS	I Spy (1965–1968)
1994	Gunsmoke: One Man's Justice	February 10, 1994	CBS	Gunsmoke (1955–1975)
1994	Hart to Hart: Home Is Where the Hart Is	February 18, 1994	NBC	Hart to Hart (1979–1984)
1994	Hart to Hart: Crimes of the Heart	March 25, 1994	NBC	Hart to Hart (1979–1984)
1994	Hart to Hart: Old Friends Never Die	May 6, 1994	NBC	Hart to Hart (1979–1984)
1994	MacGyver: Lost Treasure of Atlantis	May 14, 1994	ABC	MacGyver (1985–1992)
1994	Wyatt Earp: Return to Tombstone	July 1, 1994	CBS	The Life and Legend of Wyatt Earp (1955–1961)
1994	Young Indiana Jones and the Hollywood Follies	October 15, 1994	Family Channel	The Young Indiana Jones Chronicles (1992–1993)
1994	Alien Nation: Dark Horizon	October 25, 1994	FOX	Alien Nation (1989–1990)
1994	Cagney & Lacey: The Return	November 6, 1994	CBS	Cagney & Lacey (1982–1988)
1994	MacGyver: Trail to Doomsday	November 24, 1994	ABC	MacGyver (1985–1992)
1994	The Rockford Files: I Still Love L.A.	November 27, 1994	CBS	The Rockford Files (1974–1980)
1994	Bionic Ever After?	November 29, 1994	CBS	The Six Million Dollar Man (1974–1978); The Bionic Woman (1976–1978)
1994	Spencer: The Judas Goat	December 1, 1994	Lifetime	Spenser: For Hire (1985–1988)
1995	Spencer: A Savage Place	January 4, 1995	Lifetime	Spenser: For Hire (1985–1988)
1995	Bonanza: Under Attack	January 15, 1995	NBC	Bonanza (1959–1973)
1995	Young Indiana Jones and the Treasure of the Peacock's Eye	January 15, 1995	Family Channel	The Young Indiana Jones Chronicles (1992–1993)
1995	A Walton Wedding	February 12, 1995	CBS	The Waltons (1972–1981)
1995	Simon & Simon: In Trouble Again	February 23, 1995	CBS	Simon & Simon (1981–1989)
1995	Hart to Hart: Secrets of the Hart	March 6, 1995	NBC	Hart to Hart (1979–1984)
1995	The Return of Hunter	April 30, 1995	NBC	Hunter (1984–1991)
1995	Cagney & Lacey: Together Again	May 2, 1995	CBS	Cagney & Lacey (1982–1988)
1995	The Rockford Files: A Blessing in Disguise	May 14, 1995	CBS	The Rockford Files (1974–1980)
1995	Young Indiana Jones and the Attack of the Hawkmen	October 8, 1995	Family Channel	The Young Indiana Jones Chronicles (1992–1993)
1995	Alien Nation: Body and Soul	October 10, 1995	FOX	Alien Nation (1989–1990)
1995	Cagney & Lacey: The View Through the Glass Ceiling	October 25, 1995	CBS	Cagney & Lacey (1982–1988)
1995	The Invaders	November 12–14, 1995	FOX	The Invaders (1967–1968)
1995	Hart to Hart: Two Harts in 3/4 Time	November 26, 1995	Family Channel	Hart to Hart (1979–1984)
1996	Alien Nation: Millennium	January 2, 1996	FOX	Alien Nation (1989–1990)
1996	The Rockford Files: If the Frame Fits...	January 14, 1996	CBS	The Rockford Files (1974–1980)
1996	Cagney & Lacey: True Convictions	January 29, 1996	CBS	Cagney & Lacey (1982–1988)
1996	Project: ALF	February 17, 1996	ABC	ALF (1986–1990)
1996	The Rockford Files: Godfather Knows Best	February 18, 1996	CBS	The Rockford Files (1974–1980)
1996	Hart to Hart: Harts in High Season	March 24, 1996	Family Channel	Hart to Hart (1979–1984)
1996	The Rockford Files: Friends and Foul Play	April 25, 1996	CBS	The Rockford Files (1974–1980)
1996	Wiseguy	May 2, 1996	ABC	Wiseguy (1987–1990)
1996	Young Indiana Jones: Travels with Father	June 16, 1996	Family Channel	The Young Indiana Jones Chronicles (1992–1993)
1996	Hart to Hart: Till Death Do Us Hart	August 25, 1996	Family Channel	Hart to Hart (1979–1984)
1996	The Rockford Files: Punishment and Crime	September 18, 1996	CBS	The Rockford Files (1974–1980)
1996	Alien Nation: The Enemy Within	November 12, 1996	FOX	Alien Nation (1989–1990)
1996	Dallas: J.R. Returns	November 15, 1996	CBS	Dallas (1978–1991)
1997	The Dukes of Hazzard: Reunion!	April 25, 1997	CBS	The Dukes of Hazzard (1979–1985)
1997	A Walton Easter	April 27, 1997	CBS	The Waltons (1972–1981)
1997	Knots Landing: Back to the Cul-de-Sac	May 7–9, 1997	CBS	Knots Landing (1979–1993)
1997	Alien Nation: The Udara Legacy	July 29, 1997	FOX	Alien Nation (1989–1990)
1997	Murder, She Wrote: South by Southwest	November 2, 1997	CBS	Murder, She Wrote (1984–1996)
1997	The Rockford Files: Murder and Misdemeanors	November 21, 1997	CBS	The Rockford Files (1974–1980)
1998	Dallas: War of the Ewings	April 24, 1998	CBS	Dallas (1978–1991)
1998	CHiPs '99	October 27, 1998	TNT	CHiPs (1977–1983)
1999	The Rockford Files: If It Bleeds, It Leads	April 20, 1999	CBS	The Rockford Files (1974–1980)
1999	The Patty Duke Show: Still Rockin' in Brooklyn Heights	April 27, 1999	CBS	The Patty Duke Show (1963–1966)
1999	Dr. Quinn, Medicine Woman: The Movie	May 22, 1999	CBS	Dr. Quinn, Medicine Woman (1993–1998)
2000	Mary and Rhoda	February 7, 2000	ABC	The Mary Tyler Moore Show (1970–1977)
2000	Homicide: The Movie	February 13, 2000	NBC	Homicide: Life on the Street (1993–1999)
2000	Murder, She Wrote: A Story to Die For	May 18, 2000	CBS	Murder, She Wrote (1984–1996)
2000	The Dukes of Hazzard: Hazzard in Hollywood	May 19, 2000	CBS	The Dukes of Hazzard (1979–1985)
2000	The Growing Pains Movie	November 5, 2000	ABC	Growing Pains (1985–1992)
2001	The Pretender 2001	January 22, 2001	TNT	The Pretender (1996–2000
2001	Murder, She Wrote: The Last Free Man	May 2, 2001	CBS	Murder, She Wrote (1984–1996)
2001	Dr. Quinn, Medicine Woman: The Heart Within	May 12, 2001	CBS	Dr. Quinn, Medicine Woman (1993–1998)
2001	Surviving Gilligan's Island	October 14, 2001	CBS	Gilligan's Island (1964–1967)
2001	The Facts of Life Reunion	November 18, 2001	ABC	The Facts of Life (1979–1988)
2001	The Pretender: Island of the Haunted	December 10, 2001	TNT	The Pretender (1996–2000)
2002	Diagnosis Murder: A Town Without Pitty	February 6, 2002	CBS	Diagnosis: Murder (1993–2001)
2002	Diagnosis Murder: Without Warning	April 26, 2002	CBS	Diagnosis: Murder (1993–2001)
2002	L.A. Law: The Movie	May 12, 2002	NBC	L.A. Law (1986–1994)
2002	Hunter: Return to Justice	November 16, 2002	NBC	Hunter (1984–1991)
2003	Baywatch: Hawaiian Wedding	February 28, 2003	FOX	Baywatch (1989–2001)
2003	Return to the Batcave: The Misadventures of Adam and Burt	March 9, 2003	CBS	Batman (1966–1968)
2003	Hunter: Back in Force	April 12, 2003	NBC	Hunter (1984–1991)
2003	Murder, She Wrote: The Celtic Riddle	May 9, 2003	CBS	Murder, She Wrote (1984–1996)
2004	Growing Pains: Return of the Seavers	October 16, 2004	ABC	Growing Pains (1985–1992)
2005	Walker, Texas Ranger: Trial by Fire	October 16, 2005	CBS	Walker, Texas Ranger (1993–2001)
2016	Gilmore Girls: A Year in the Life	November 25, 2016	Netflix	Gilmore Girls (2000-2007)
2017	Psych: The Movie	December 7, 2017	USA Network	Psych (2006–2014)
2020	Psych 2: Lassie Come Home	July 15, 2020	Peacock	Psych (2006–2014)
2021	Psych 3: This Is Gus	November 18, 2021	Peacock	Psych (2006–2014)
2021	Nash Bridges	November 27, 2021	USA Network	Nash Bridges (1996–2001)
2023	Mighty Morphin Power Rangers: Once & Always	April 19, 2023	Netflix	Mighty Morphin Power Rangers (1993–1995)
2023	Zoey 102	July 27, 2023	Paramount+	Zoey 101 (2005–2008)
2023	Mr. Monk's Last Case: A Monk Movie	December 8, 2023	Peacock	Monk (2002–2009)
2024	The Thundermans Return	March 7, 2024	Paramount+ and Nickelodeon	The Thundermans (2013–2018)
2025	Henry Danger: The Movie	January 17, 2025	Paramount+ and Nickelodeon	Henry Danger (2014–2020)
2026	Malcolm in the Middle: Life's Still Unfair	April 10, 2026	Hulu	Malcolm in the Middle (2000–2006)

== Television reunion specials ==
The following is a list of specials celebrating a classic television series (retrospective, cast reunion, reminiscence, behind-the-scenes, interview/clip show).

Year	Title	Airdate	Network	Parent series
1965	The Danny Thomas TV Family Reunion	February 14, 1965	NBC	The Danny Thomas Show (1953–1964)
1969	Make Room for Granddaddy	September 14, 1969	CBS	The Danny Thomas Show (1953–1964)
1976	The Honeymooners Second Honeymoon	February 2, 1976	ABC	The Honeymooners (1955–1956)
1977	Thanksgiving Reunion with The Partridge Family and My Three Sons	November 25, 1977	ABC	My Three Sons (1960–1972); The Partridge Family (1970–1974)
1977	The Honeymooners Christmas	November 28, 1977	ABC	The Honeymooners (1955–1956)
1978	The Honeymooners Valentine Special	February 13, 1978	ABC	The Honeymooners (1955–1956)
1978	The Honeymooners Christmas Special	December 10, 1978	ABC	The Honeymooners (1955–1956)
1979	Legends of the Superheroes	January 18–25, 1979	NBC	Batman (1966–1968)
1985	The Honeymooners Reunion	May 13, 1985	NBC	The Honeymooners (1955–1956)
1985	The Honeymooners Anniversary Celebration	October 18, 1985	Syndication	The Honeymooners (1955–1956)
1986	The Flintstones' 25th Anniversary Celebration	May 20, 1986	CBS	The Flintstones (1960–1966)
1988	The Smothers Brothers Comedy Hour: The 20th Reunion	February 3, 1988	CBS	The Smothers Brothers Comedy Hour (1967–1969)
1989	Sesame Street... 20 Years & Still Counting	April 7, 1989	NBC	Sesame Street (1969–present)
1989	Saturday Night Live: 15th Anniversary Special	September 24, 1989	NBC	Saturday Night Live (1975–present)
1990	Father Still Knows Best: A Father's Day Special	June 17, 1990	Family Channel	Father Knows Best (1954–1960)
1990	The Honeymooners Anniversary Special	November 12, 1990	CBS	The Honeymooners (1955–1956)
1991	All in the Family: 20th Anniversary Special	February 16, 1991	CBS	All in the Family (1971–1979)
1991	Mary Tyler Moore: The 20th Anniversary Show	February 18, 1991	CBS	The Mary Tyler Moore Show (1970–1977)
1991	The Bob Newhart Show: The 19th Anniversary Special	November 23, 1991	CBS	The Bob Newhart Show (1972–1978)
1991	Memories of M*A*S*H	November 25, 1991	CBS	M*A*S*H (1972–1983)
1992	The Happy Days Reunion Special	March 3, 1992	ABC	Happy Days (1974–1984)
1993	The Carol Burnett Show: A Reunion	January 10, 1993	CBS	The Carol Burnett Show (1967–1978)
1993	The Andy Griffith Show Reunion	February 10, 1993	CBS	The Andy Griffith Show (1960–1968)
1993	Bradymania: A Very Brady Special	May 19, 1993	ABC	The Brady Bunch (1969–1974)
1993	The Legend of the Beverly Hillbillies	May 24, 1993	CBS	The Beverly Hillbillies (1962–1971)
1995	The Laverne & Shirley Reunion	May 22, 1995	ABC	Laverne & Shirley (1976–1983)
1995	Brady Bunch Home Movies	May 24, 1995	CBS	The Brady Bunch (1969–1974)
1997	Hey, Hey, It's the Monkees	February 17, 1997	ABC	The Monkees (1966–1968)
1999	Saturday Night Live: 25th Anniversary Special	September 26, 1999	NBC	Saturday Night Live (1975–present)
2000	The Real McCoys Reunion	May 29, 2000	TNN	The Real McCoys (1957–1963)
2001	I Love Lucy: 50th Anniversary Special	November 11, 2001	CBS	I Love Lucy (1951–1957)
2001	The Carol Burnett Show: Show Stoppers	November 26, 2001	CBS	The Carol Burnett Show (1967–1978)
2002	American Bandstand: 50th Anniversary Celebration	May 3, 2002	ABC	American Bandstand (1952–1989)
2002	The Honeymooners: 50th Anniversary Celebration	May 6, 2002	CBS	The Honeymooners (1955–1956)
2002	Laverne & Shirley: Together Again	May 7, 2002	ABC	Laverne & Shirley (1976–1983)
2002	The Mary Tyler Moore Reunion	May 13, 2002	CBS	The Mary Tyler Moore Show (1970–1977)
2002	M*A*S*H: 30th Anniversary Reunion	May 17, 2002	FOX	M*A*S*H (1972–1983)
2002	The Cosby Show: A Look Back	May 19, 2002	NBC	The Cosby Show (1984–1992)
2003	Married... with Children Reunion	February 16, 2003	FOX	Married... with Children (1987–1997)
2003	Tim Allen Presents: A User's Guide to Home Improvement	May 4, 2003	ABC	Home Improvement (1991–1999)
2003	Beverly Hills, 90210: The Reunion	May 11, 2003	FOX	Beverly Hills, 90210 (1990–2000)
2003	The Golden Girls: Their Greatest Moments	June 2, 2003	Lifetime	The Golden Girls (1985–1992)
2003	The Designing Women Reunion	July 28, 2003	Lifetime	Designing Women (1986–1993)
2003	The Alan Brady Show	August 17, 2003	TV Land	The Dick Van Dyke Show (1961–1966)
2003	The Andy Griffith Show Reunion: Back to Mayberry	November 11, 2003	CBS	The Andy Griffith Show (1960–1968)
2004	The Dick Van Dyke Show Revisited	May 11, 2004	CBS	The Dick Van Dyke Show (1961–1966)
2004	The Carol Burnett Show: Let's Bump Up the Lights!	May 12, 2004	CBS	The Carol Burnett Show (1967–1978)
2004	The Brady Bunch 35th Anniversary Reunion Special	September 26, 2004	TV Land	The Brady Bunch (1969–1974)
2004	Dallas Reunion: The Return to Southfork	November 7, 2004	CBS	Dallas (1978–1991)
2004	The Seinfeld Story	November 25, 2004	NBC	Seinfeld (1989–1998)
2004	The Nanny Reunion: A Nosh to Remember	December 6, 2004	Lifetime	The Nanny (1993–1999)
2005	Happy Days: 30th Anniversary Reunion	February 3, 2005	ABC	Happy Days (1974–1984)
2005	The One Day at a Time Reunion	February 22, 2005	CBS	One Day at a Time (1975–1984)
2005	All That 10th Anniversary Reunion Special	April 23, 2005	Nickelodeon	All That (1994–2005)
2005	Knots Landing Reunion: Together Again	December 2, 2005	CBS	Knots Landing (1979–1993)
2006	Dynasty Reunion: Catfights & Caviar	May 2, 2006	CBS	Dynasty (1981–1989)
2006	The Brady Bunch Cast Back in Hawaii	June 16, 2006	TV Land	The Brady Bunch (1969–1974)
2008	Living Single: The Reunion Show	September 22, 2008	TV One	Living Single (1993–1998)
2010	The Simpsons 20th Anniversary Special – In 3-D! On Ice!	January 10, 2010	FOX	The Simpsons (1989–present)
2010	A Walton's Family Reunion	October 18, 2010	INSP	The Waltons (1972–1981)
2015	Saturday Night Live 40th Anniversary Special	February 15, 2015	NBC	Saturday Night Live (1975–present)
2016	MADtv 20th Anniversary Reunion	January 12, 2016	The CW	MADtv (1995–2009)
2016	All That 22nd Anniversary Reunion Special	April 16, 2016	Nickelodeon	All That (1994–2005)
2016	50 Years of Star Trek	August 14, 2016	History Channel	Star Trek (1965-)
2017	The Carol Burnett Show: 50th Anniversary Special	December 3, 2017	CBS	The Carol Burnett Show (1967–1978)
2019	Still Laugh-In: The Stars Celebrate	May 14, 2019	Netflix	Rowan & Martin's Laugh-In (1968–1973)
2019	Sesame Street's 50th Anniversary Celebration	November 9, 2019	HBO	Sesame Street (1969–present)
2020	A Parks and Recreation Special	April 30, 2020	NBC	Parks and Recreation (2009–2015)
2020	30 Rock: A One-Time Special	July 30, 2020	NBC	30 Rock (2006–2013)
2020	The Fresh Prince of Bel-Air Reunion	November 18, 2020	HBO Max	The Fresh Prince of Bel-Air (1990–1996)
2021	Friends: The Reunion	May 27, 2021	HBO Max	Friends (1994–2004)
2022	Martin: The Reunion	June 16, 2022	BET+	Martin (1992–1997)
2024	The Tonight Show Starring Jimmy Fallon: 10th Anniversary Special	May 14, 2024	NBC	The Tonight Show Starring Jimmy Fallon (2014-Present)
2025	Saturday Night Live 50th Anniversary Special	February 16, 2025	NBC	Saturday Night Live (1975–present)
2025	The Golden Girls: 40 Years of Laughter and Friendship	November 11, 2025	ABC/Hulu	The Golden Girls (1985–1992)
2025	Everybody Loves Raymond: 30th Anniversary Reunion	November 24, 2025	CBS	Everybody Loves Raymond (1996–2005)
2025	Everybody Loves Raymond: 30th Anniversary Reunion Pt. 2	December 22, 2025	CBS	Everybody Loves Raymond (1996–2005)
