= Mary Tyler Moore: The 20th Anniversary Show =

US television program

- Written by: Phillip Savenick; Laurie Jacobson; Marcia Lewis
- Directed by: Jack Haley Jr.
- Presented by: Mary Tyler Moore
- Starring: Mary Tyler Moore; Ed Asner; Valerie Harper; Gavin MacLeod; Betty White; Georgia Engel; Cloris Leachman
- Music by: Pat Williams
- Opening theme: "Love Is All Around" written and sung by Sonny Curtis
- Country of origin: United States
- Original language: English

Production
- Executive producers: Jack Haley Jr. James L. Brooks; Allan Burns; Ed. Weinberger
- Producers: Phillip Savenick; Kevin Miller; Laurie Jacobson
- Cinematography: Paul Lohmann
- Editors: Kevin Miller; Vic Lowrey; John Bowen
- Running time: 90 minutes
- Production companies: MTM Enterprises; CBS Productions

Original release
- Network: CBS
- Release: February 18, 1991

Related
- Lou Grant; Mary and Rhoda

Mary Tyler Moore: The 20th Anniversary Show is a 1991 American television special to commemorate the 20th anniversary of the first broadcast of the sitcom The Mary Tyler Moore Show. It was directed by Jack Haley Jr. and was broadcast on CBS on February 18, 1991.

== Summary ==
Mary Tyler Moore hosts a 20th anniversary retrospective of The Mary Tyler Moore Show featuring a compilation of clips from the show's memorable moments and a reunion with co-stars Ed Asner, Valerie Harper, Gavin MacLeod, Betty White, Georgia Engel and Cloris Leachman. The cast comments how the groundbreaking show was ahead of its time for having a thirtysomething, single female as its main character and how it revealed the changing consciousness of the 1970s.

Moore introduces clips highlighting each of the show's individual characters, after which cast members comment on their character's specific traits and quirks. The cast also pays tribute to the late Ted Knight (who died in 1986) for his portrayal of TV anchorman Ted Baxter.

The special concludes with the teary-eyed cast watching the final moments from the series finale, "The Last Show".

Filming for Mary Tyler Moore: The 20th Anniversary Show took place in the living room of producer and director Jack Haley Jr., rather than on a traditional television soundstage. His home was utilized to provide a warm, intimate venue for the cast reunion.

== Cast ==
- Mary Tyler Moore (Host)
- Ed Asner (Guest)
- Valerie Harper (Guest)
- Gavin MacLeod (Guest)
- Betty White (Guest)
- Georgia Engel (Guest)
- Cloris Leachman (Guest)

== Reception ==
Mary Tyler Moore: The 20th Anniversary Show was a huge Nielsen ratings winner for CBS, earning an 11th-place finish and receiving a 17.4 rating (16.2 million households) for the week of February 18, 1991.

== See also ==
- Mary and Rhoda
- The Mary Tyler Moore Reunion
- List of television reunion films
