= The Mary Tyler Moore Reunion =

Television special

- Written by: Dann Netter; A.D. Oppenheim
- Directed by: Gary Smith
- Presented by: Mary Tyler Moore
- Starring: Mary Tyler Moore; Ed Asner; Gavin MacLeod; Betty White; Valerie Harper; Cloris Leachman; Georgia Engel
- Opening theme: "Love Is All Around" by Joan Jett & the Blackhearts
- Country of origin: United States
- Original language: English

Production
- Executive producer: Gary Smith
- Producers: Dann Netter; A.D. Oppenheim
- Running time: 60 minutes
- Production companies: CBS Productions; Viacom Productions; Foxstar; Smith-Hemion Productions

Original release
- Network: CBS
- Release: May 13, 2002

Related
- Mary and Rhoda

The Mary Tyler Moore Reunion is a 2002 American television special celebrating the classic 1970–1977 sitcom The Mary Tyler Moore Show. It was broadcast on CBS on Monday, May 13, 2002, from 10:00 to 11:00 p.m. ET/PT.

== Summary ==
Mary Tyler Moore hosts a retrospective of The Mary Tyler Moore Show and conducts one-on-one interviews with surviving cast members Ed Asner, Gavin MacLeod, Betty White, Valerie Harper, Cloris Leachman and Georgia Engel, to reminisce about their time together on the show and featuring a montage of clips from past episodes. A special tribute segment to the late Ted Knight is also included with memorable scenes highlighting his character as Ted Baxter.

During the special, Mary reveals the result of an online poll conducted by CBS.com where fans were asked to vote for their favorite Mary Tyler Moore episode and the winner is "Chuckles Bites the Dust". The opening title sequence features the 1996 remake of the show's theme song "Love Is All Around" performed by Joan Jett & The Blackhearts.

== Cast ==
- Mary Tyler Moore
- Ed Asner
- Gavin MacLeod
- Betty White
- Valerie Harper
- Cloris Leachman
- Georgia Engel
- Jack Riley as the announcer

== See also ==
- Mary and Rhoda
- Mary Tyler Moore: The 20th Anniversary Show
