= Night Terror (film) =

1973 television film by Philip Leacock

- Home media artwork
- Genre: Thriller; horror
- Written by: Carl Gabler; Richard DeNeut
- Directed by: E.W. Swackhamer
- Starring: Valerie Harper; Richard Romanus; Michael Tolan
- Music by: Fred Steiner
- Country of origin: United States
- Original language: English

Production
- Executive producer: Lee Rich
- Producers: Joel Glickman; Daniel Selznick
- Cinematography: Frank Beascoechea; Vilis Lapenieks
- Editor: Aaron Stell
- Running time: 74 minutes
- Production company: Charles Fries Productions

Original release
- Network: National Broadcasting Company
- Release: February 7, 1977

Night Terror (also known as Night Drive) is a 1977 American made-for-television horror thriller film directed by E.W. Swackhamer and starring Valerie Harper and Richard Romanus. Its plot follows a woman who, while traveling alone by car one night, is pursued by a psychopath after witnessing him commit a murder.

== Plot ==
Housewife Carol Turner accompanies her husband, Walter, on a business trip to Phoenix, which the two plan to conclude by driving back to their home in Denver. When Walter's business obligation requires an extended stay, Carol arranges to drive back home herself, where her sister Vera is caring for the couple's two children, Nancy and Buddy. Alone in her hotel that night, Carol receives a call from Vera notifying her that Buddy has been hospitalized. Unable to reach Walter, Carol unsuccessfully attempts to book a flight, and later rents a station wagon to drive back to Denver.

Just before midnight, Carol attempts to get gasoline at a service station, but is turned away by two young men who have closed the station early to party with their girlfriends. Carol begins driving on Interstate 17, hoping to find another service station. When a police officer pulls over a speeding car, Carol momentarily stops to ask the officer where the nearest gas station is. Before the officer can respond, the driver of the vehicle shoots him to death with a shotgun, and shines a floodlight in Carol's face, momentarily blinding her.

The assailant — a serial killer with an electrolarynx — pursues Carol, but she manages to evade him by pulling off the interstate, where her station wagon finally dies on a remote country road. She manages to roll the vehicle down a hill to a shuttered gas station and convenience store. Carol breaks into the station and manages to locate the pump keys in the register before being confronted by a vagrant who initially frightens her, but ultimately helps her retrieve gasoline.

The killer again manages to locate Carol, chasing her up a winding two-lane road as a rainstorm begins. Carol stumbles across a drunken man in his car who has parked to wait out the rainstorm. The two have a momentary conversation, but, as Carol attempts to warn the man, the killer shoots him to death. Carol backs the car into that of the killer, before speeding away in the dead man's car. Meanwhile, the killer hot-wires Carol's station wagon, but she evades him as she travels through the mountains.

At dawn, Carol again runs out of gas, and is directed by the elderly residents of a nearby home to a neighboring house several miles down the road, as the couple do not have a telephone, and their son, who is working on an irrigation ditch, has the keys to their truck. As Carol departs on foot, the killer passes by her abandoned car on the side of the road. He manages to steal the truck from the elderly couple, and approaches Carol down the road. Believing he is the elderly couple's son, Carol agrees when he offers her a ride. Carol soon notices that the truck has no key in the ignition, and realizes the man is her attacker. She attempts to leap from the truck, before the two struggle, causing the man to crash the truck off the road. Carol manages to take control of the truck and crashes into the man, severely injuring him. Carol observes a helicopter flying overhead. In an attempt to get its attention, she forces a scarf into the gas tank before lighting it on fire, causing the truck to explode.

Carol is ultimately saved, and arrives at the hospital in Denver. Shortly after, Walter arrives from Denver. Unaware of what has transpired, Walter asks Carol how she sustained the injuries on her hand, to which she begins laughing.

== Cast ==
- Valerie Harper as Carol Turner
- Richard Romanus the Killer
- Nicholas Pryor as Man in Sports Car
- John Quade as the Derelict
- Michael Tolan as Walter Turner
- Beatrice Manley as Vera Willis
- Quinn Cummings as Nancy
- Damon Raskin as Buddy
- Madeleine Taylor Holmes as Indian Woman
- John War Eagle as Indian Man
- Jan Burrell as Waitress
- Gary Springer as Gas Station Attendant
- Gary Barton as Gas Station Attendant
- Dinah Manoff as Attendant's Girlfriend
- Linda Lukens as Attendant's Girlfriend

== Release ==
Night Terror was long only available in home media format on VHS. On June 29, 2021, Scorpion Releasing in association with Kino Lorber released the film for the first time on Blu-ray.

== Sources ==
- Deal, David (2015). Television Fright Films of the 1970s. Jefferson, North Carolina: McFarland. ISBN 978-0-786-45514-0.
- Sykes, Brad (2018). Terror in the Desert: Dark Cinema of the American Southwest. Jefferson, North Carolina: McFarland. ISBN 978-1-476-63132-5.
