= The Mary Tyler Moore Show opening sequence =

Segment of a television series

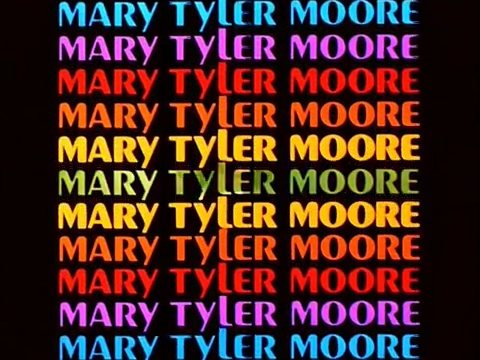
First scene of The Mary Tyler Moore Show opening sequence.

The Mary Tyler Moore Show opening sequence is an element of the American television series The Mary Tyler Moore Show. The theme song, "Love Is All Around", was written and performed by Sonny Curtis.

== Scenes ==
The sequence, which was filmed in March 1970, was created by Reza Badiyi who had also done the opening sequence for Hawaii Five-O. Badiyi came up with the idea for the final shot, which Entertainment Weekly ranked as the second greatest moment in 1970s television.

The original opening title sequence for the show begins with the name of its star across the screen in the Peignot font, which then multiplies both upward and downward vertically in a number of colors, followed by a montage of Mary driving towards Minneapolis towards her new home, and walking in her new neighborhood.

In the final shot, she gleefully tosses her tam o' shanter in the air in the middle of the street; a freeze-frame captures her smiling face and the hat in mid-air. An older woman can be seen in the background, obviously puzzled by the sight of a young woman tossing her hat in the air. This unwitting "extra" was Hazel Frederick, a lifelong Minnesota resident who happened to be out shopping the day the sequence was shot. Frederick finally met Moore in 1996 when she was on a book tour for her autobiography, After All. Moore introduced Frederick as "my co-star". Even though many people thought that the scowling woman in the opening sequence was grumpy-looking, she actually had just been concerned for Moore's safety. In 2002, on Good Morning America, Moore said, "It was so cold, I couldn't protest. The words weren't forming," she said. "So I did as I was told, and dear Hazel Frederick, who was frozen forever in the background, looking with what appears to be a scowling face at me, and she told me later, because I did meet her, that it was just that she had no idea what was going on, never saw a camera. She just thought there was a lunatic about to lose her life."

The theme visuals were changed significantly after Season 1, and were usually "tweaked" every season thereafter. In later seasons, David Davis is given a credit for "Title Visualization". The "driving to Minneapolis" sequence was dropped, and the theme then featured brief shots of Mary, mostly engaging in everyday activities around Minneapolis as well as interacting with the newsroom staff. In a brief sequence set in the newsroom, Mary hugs Lou, Murray and Ted, accidentally crushing Ted's fedora in the process, before straightening it out. This was a scene from the end of the Season 1 episode "Christmas and the Hard-Luck Kid", although the producers eventually re-shot this sequence for use in the opening credits from Season 4 onward.

Also seen during Season 2 and Season 3 were shots featuring Mary and Rhoda in Mary's apartment, as well as a shot of Mary and Phyllis, which was inserted into episodes in which Phyllis appeared. (Her portrayer, Cloris Leachman, was a semi-regular, and did not appear in every episode.) During Season 4 and Season 5, the interior shot of Mary and Rhoda was replaced with a brief shot of Mary and Rhoda walking down a Minneapolis street, laughing. This shot remained until Valerie Harper left the series in late 1974, although it also appeared in two 1975 episodes. The characters of Sue Ann and Georgette, both semi-regular characters after Season 4, never appeared in the opening credit sequence.

No matter what other changes were made from year to year, however, the iconic final hat-tossing shot (including Hazel Frederick) was retained in every iteration of the theme.

Other clips used in later versions of the theme:

- From 1973 to the end of the show's run in 1977, Mary is shown washing her Ford Mustang while wearing the #10 home jersey of Minnesota Vikings' quarterback Fran Tarkenton.
- Some of the scenes show Mary interacting with crew members and others involved in the show's production. In one, the camera zooms in on Mary eating at a restaurant overlooking the Crystal Court of the IDS Center with an older man, Moore's then-husband Grant Tinker, who served as president of MTM Enterprises until 1981. Another scene shows Mary walking in the park, where she is passed by two joggers: co-creator James L. Brooks and producer David Davis.
- In later seasons, Mary is shown looking at a package of meat at a supermarket, then rolling her eyes as she throws it into her shopping cart. This is a reference to the 1973 meat shortage and resulting high consumer price of beef. In 2009, CBS's Nancy Giles, commenting on the high cost of small packages of food, showed this clip and said that it seems only she and Mary Richards buy them.

== Theme song ==
"Love Is All Around"

Single by Sonny Curtis

from the album Love Is All Around
- Released: July 1970
- Recorded: 1970
- Length: 2:44
- Label: Elektra
- Songwriter: Sonny Curtis

The theme song, "Love Is All Around", was written and performed by Sonny Curtis, but is often mistakenly attributed to Paul Williams; Pat Williams wrote the show's music. The first season's lyrics are words of encouragement directed to the character, referring to the end of a previous relationship and making a fresh start, beginning with "How will you make it on your own?" and concluding with "You might just make it after all." The more familiar version of the song used in seasons 2–7 changed the lyrics to affirm her optimistic character, beginning with the iconic line "Who can turn the world on with her smile?" and concluding with a more definitive "You're gonna make it after all." An instrumental version of the tune was used for the show's closing credits featuring a saxophone on lead in Season 1; a new version of the closing was usually recorded each season, sometimes with only minor changes. A different instrumental version of the song was later used for the opening of Moore's 1979 variety series, The Mary Tyler Moore Hour.

Sonny Curtis recorded two full-length versions of the song, both with significantly different arrangements from the TV versions. The first was released as a single on Ovation Records in 1970, while the second was included on Curtis' Elektra Records album of the same name in 1980. The latter recording, which featured a country arrangement, reached No. 29 on the Billboard Hot Country Singles chart.

The song has been covered by artists such as Ray Conniff, Joan Jett and the Blackhearts, Christie Front Drive, Sammy Davis Jr., and Twin Cities-based Hüsker Dü (the latter also reproduced several scenes of the opening on location for their music video). It was sampled in the Urge Overkill song Night and Grey. The song was also featured in a long-running commercial for Chase bank in the mid-2000s, and was sung in the TV series 7th Heaven in the episode "In Praise of Women" during the birth of the Camden twins. A dance version was featured in the 1995 Isaac Mizrahi documentary Unzipped. The 2000 TV movie Mary and Rhoda started with the original version of the song and then switched to the Joan Jett cover.

During the ending scene of the 2016 film Christine, about a TV reporter/newscaster, the song is heard playing on the TV, and sung along to by one of the characters.

== Minneapolis locations ==
=== Nicollet Mall ===
Many of the outdoor scenes in the opening sequence were filmed along Nicollet Mall in Minneapolis. In 2001, The New York Times stated that it is not unusual for people walking along the mall to be so reminded of the show that they toss their hats in the air, as Mary did at the end of the sequence.

The iconic hat toss was filmed at the intersection with 7th Street. On May 8, 2002, cable TV network TV Land dedicated an 8-foot (2.4 m) tall bronze statue of Moore tossing her hat near that intersection. Many in the press were skeptical of TV Land's motive at first, some claiming it was a marketing strategy, and one Macalester College professor stating that it was "like honoring a unicorn." Moore herself unveiled the statue, where 3,000 tams were distributed to the crowd of onlookers so they could participate in a commemorative hat toss.

The Dayton's department store is in the background of some of those downtown scenes (later Marshall Field's and Macy's, now a new development, "The Dayton's Project"). The exact spot where the cap toss occurred has been debated extensively, because the layout along Nicollet has changed substantially since the early 1970s; the actual backdrop of the toss, the Donaldson's department store diagonally across the street from Dayton's, was destroyed in 1982 by the Minneapolis Thanksgiving Day Fire.

=== IDS Center ===
The IDS Center was under construction when the original opening sequence was filmed. For an updated sequence used during the fourth season, Mary visited the completed building and was seen riding up the escalator in the Crystal Court. This exposure on prime-time television predated, by two months, the official presentation by architect Philip Johnson of the completion of the project in Architectural Forum. Another scene from the same building showed Mary dining with a man (her then-husband, Grant Tinker) at what was until 2017 the Mary Tyler Moore Table at Basil's Restaurant. The manager of Basil's said in 2006 that his customers still frequently requested the table where Mary sat. The IDS Center is located across the street from RSM Plaza, which was used for establishing shots of Mary's workplace.

=== Highway ===
Scenes showing Mary driving a white 1970 Ford Mustang toward Minneapolis in the first-season sequence were supposedly filmed on Interstate 494 (the Doubletree by Hilton Bloomington, at the time a Radisson, can be seen in the background) and approaching downtown Minneapolis on the Trunk Highway 65 spur from northbound I-35W. Furthermore, an aerial shot that prominently features the Basilica of Saint Mary features US 12 (now Interstate 394) heading west away from the city near the exit to Lyndale Avenue. I-94, which now runs behind the Basilica from the aerial's vantage point, was not yet completed in the area at the time the aerial film was shot.

=== Lake of the Isles ===
Some of the scenes with Mary walking in front of lakes and with school children were shot around Lake of the Isles at different times of the year. A scene with school children and a crossing guard was shot at the north end of the lake at Franklin facing south. In season 6 she is seen walking along the southeast shore in the winter with the bridge over the Cedar Lake channel passageway in the background. The image transitions to summer and we see Mary walking along the northeast shore passing joggers. The footage in the winter clip is mirror-image flipped (with a left-right transposition), probably for the continuity of walking direction with the summer clip. In the winter clip the east side of the Cedar Lake channel bridge faces southeast when in fact it faces northeast.

== Reception ==
In 1997, the Seattle Post-Intelligencer called the sequence one of the best in history. In 2010, TV Guide ranked the sequence #3 on its list of TV's top 10 credits sequences, as selected by readers. In 2017, James Charisma of Paste ranked the show's opening sequence #15 on a list of The 75 Best TV Title Sequences of All Time.

== In popular culture ==
The sequence has been referenced and parodied numerous times. Oprah Winfrey recreated the entire opening sequence of the show in Chicago, with herself in the role of Mary. The All New Alexei Sayle Show parodies the opening credits in its opening sequence, with Alexei Sayle dancing through the streets of London to the theme song 'Life's a Big Banana Sandwich'. In the "Saturdays of Thunder" episode of The Simpsons (also produced by Mary Tyler Moore creator James L. Brooks), Homer criticizes his sister-in-law Patty's Mary Tyler Moore style hairdo, to which her sister Selma insists he be ignored, retorting, "You can turn the world on with your smile," in reference to the theme song's opening lyric.

A 1984 episode of Saturday Night Live included a sketch that quoted the theme. Guest-host Ed Asner (who had played Lou Grant on Mary Tyler Moore) reprises the character as hiring mercenaries to "rescue" Mary from "syndicated reruns". Two of the mercenaries, played by Rich Hall and Jim Belushi, ask about the objective:

Mercenary #1: Is it true what they say about her?
Lou Grant: What?
Mercenary #1: She can turn the world on with her smile.
Lou Grant: [ sentimental ] Yeah... yeah, she could...
Mercenary #2: And could she really take a nothing day, and suddenly make it all seem worthwhile?
Lou Grant: No, of course not! Don't be stupid!

Often, the hat toss is the main focus of the parody. During the closing credits of the spin-off Rhoda, she also tries to fling her hat in the air while in the middle of Times Square, but it just falls to the ground and she must sheepishly pick it up. In the episode "And Maggie Makes Three" of The Simpsons, while working at a bowling alley, Homer spins around singing, "I'm gonna make it after all!", and tosses a bowling ball in the air, denting the hardwood floor when it falls. In the first episode of Suddenly Susan, Brooke Shields' character hears the theme song from The Mary Tyler Moore Show and throws her remote control in the air. It hits her in the head. Peter Griffin wins a piano competition in the Family Guy episode "Wasted Talent" by playing "Love Is All Around". Afterwards, during the audience's applause a girl throws her hat in the air and freezes, while those around her look perplexed as to why she and the hat are not moving. On the series Girlfriends, Maya throws her hat in the air after arriving in New York City to meet with a book publisher; the hat is caught by someone walking nearby, who runs off with it. Adam Carolla parodied the twirl and freeze-frame hat toss at the end of the opening credits for his home improvement series The Adam Carolla Project. In sixth season All in the Family episode "Mike's Move", when Edith learns that Mike was offered a teaching job in Minneapolis, she asks, "Isn't that the place where Mary Tyler Moore keeps losing her hat?"

In the Scrubs season one episode, "My 15 Minutes", Elliot takes a cab downtown at night. The Mary Tyler Moore theme plays as Elliot emerges from her cab. She twirls around and tosses her hat into the air and the music stops with a jolt when a young man bumps into her. He grabs the hat and sticks it on his head and keeps walking. The Latest Buzz twice parodies the hat toss: in the pilot "The First Issue", Rebecca (one of the new teen writers of Teen Buzz magazine) throws her hat up before leaving the office, which fails to come down; this is revisited in the series finale "The Final Issue" (which involves the staff's firing, similar to the final episode of The Mary Tyler Moore Show), as one of the replacement teen writers, Lucy, does the toss with the same result, down to Rebecca giving the same advice to Lucy that her boss DJ gave to her during her first week on the job after the hat toss mishap.

In 2006, Canadian singer Serena Ryder pays homage to the title sequence of the Mary Tyler Moore show in her video for "Good Morning Starshine".
