= List of The Honeymooners sketches =

This article provides a list of all known sketches of The Honeymooners.

26 sketches were known to have aired in the 1951–52 season on DuMont's Cavalcade of Stars and two on The Ed Sullivan Show. Eight surviving episodes from Cavalcade have been released on DVD as of 2011. The two from The Ed Sullivan Show remain unreleased but can be found on the Internet Archive. The Archive also contains an uncut (including commercials) copy of the February 1967 Honeymooners sketch "Life Upon the Wicked Stage", which has never been released on DVD.

104 sketches were known to have aired between 1952 and 1957 on CBS's The Jackie Gleason Show. Known as the "Lost Episodes", most of them have been released on DVD as of 2002.

The "Classic 39" episodes of 1955–56 are not included in this list as they constitute a sitcom version of The Honeymooners.

== Cavalcade of Stars (1951–52) ==
The following is a listing of "Honeymooners" sketches that aired during the 1951–52 season of Cavalcade of Stars on the DuMont Television Network (*except where noted).

No.	Title	Duration	Original release date
1	"Bread"	5:55	October 5, 1951
Ralph and Alice Kramden argue over the fact there is no bread to go with Ralph's dinner. NOTES: This is the first "Honeymooners" sketch, featuring Pert Kelton as Alice and Art Carney as a policeman.
2	"Razor Blades"	5:02	October 12, 1951
Ralph has his face lathered up and ready for a shave but cannot find his razor blades.
3	"Supermarket Shopping/Alice's Anniversary"	Lost	October 19, 1951
Alice is determined to get a gift from Ralph for her birthday, even if she has to buy it herself.
4	"The New Television Set"	8:24	November 2, 1951
Ralph relents in and buys Alice a television set. NOTES: Debuts of Ed and Trixie Norton, played by Carney and Elaine Stritch.
5	"Ralph Threatens to Leave"	6:34	November 16, 1951
Ralph does not like the vegetable meat loaf Alice has prepared for dinner and starts an argument.
6	"Alice and Ralph Get Dressed for a Date Last Night"	8:19	November 30, 1951
Ralph and Alice argue on a night they are to join the Nortons on a night on the town. Norton comes down and tells them the dance was the night before.
7	"The Ring Salesman"	8:52	December 7, 1951
Ralph is jealous of Joe the jeweler, who he believes Alice is having an affair with. NOTE: First sketch featuring Joyce Randolph as Trixie Norton.
8	"The Quiz Show"	12:11	December 14, 1951
Ralph and Alice come home with a year's supply of Krinkly Krax cereal that they have won as a consolation prize on a radio quiz show.
9	"Christmas Party"	36:49	December 21, 1951
After Alice sends Ralph back out for buying potato salad at the wrong delicatessen, the Kramden apartment is visited by five of Jackie Gleason's colorful characters (in order of appearance): Fenwick Babbitt, Joe The Bartender, The Poor Soul, Rudy The Repairman and Reggie Van Gleason III. Featuring performances by guest stars Jane Pickens (appearing as a Vaudeville friend of Trixie's) and juggler Rudy Cardenas. This is the first of three versions of this holiday episode, remade under the same episode name on December 20, 1952 and December 19, 1953.
10	"Alice's Sister Argues with Her Husband"	Lost	January 4, 1952
11	"Alice Finds a Dog"	Lost	February 1, 1952
12	"Cold"	Lost	February 8, 1952
Ralph has a cold and Alice is nursing him back to health. She lets it be known to Ralph that she took out a life insurance policy on him. Ralph has a fit and accuses her of wanting him to die, but when Alice tells Ralph that she also took one out on her own life, he feels like a dope and apologizes.
13	"The Ring Salesman"	8:09	March 28, 1952
last existing DuMont "Honeymooners" sketch.
14	"The Ring Salesman"	9:07	March 30, 1952
Repeat of earlier sketch, performed on CBS Television's The Ed Sullivan Show. (Jackie Gleason and "The Honeymooners" first appearance on CBS.) Unreleased
15	"Surprise Party"	Lost	April 4, 1952
16	"Easter Hats"	9:50 Lost	April 11, 1952
17	"Spring Cleaning"	Lost	April 18, 1952
18	"The Dance"	9:43	May 4, 1952
Performed on CBS Television's The Ed Sullivan Show. (Second appearance of "The Honeymooners" on CBS. Pert Kelton's last appearance on CBS as Alice.) Unreleased
19	"Manager of the Baseball Team"	Lost	May 16, 1952
20	"Vacation Plans (Vacation at Fred's Landing)"	Lost	May 30, 1952
21	"Bus Driver's Frolics (Alice Plays the Trombone)"	Lost	
22	"Meat Substitute"	Lost	
23	"The Home Run Ball"	Lost	
24	"The Mystery Novel"	Lost	
25	"The Expectant Father (Alice Knitting Sweater for Dog)"	Lost	
26	"The Driving Lesson"	Lost	

== The Jackie Gleason Show (1952–70) ==
The following is a listing of "Honeymooners" sketches that aired during the eight seasons of The Jackie Gleason Show on CBS.

=== Season 1 (1952–53) ===
No.	Title	Duration	Original release date
1	"The New Bowling Ball"	9:35	September 20, 1952
Ralph's new bowling ball gets stuck on his finger. This was Audrey Meadows' very first appearance playing Alice Kramden in Gleason's The Honeymooners sketch.
2	"The Turkey"	10:13	September 27, 1952
Alice misplaces her wedding ring; Ralph thinks a turkey ate it.
3	"Sprained Thumb"	Lost	October 4, 1952
Ralph wears Alice to a frazzle after a bus accident leaves Ralph with a sprained thumb. NOTE: Though listed on The Honeymooners: Lost Episodes 1951–1957: The Complete Restored Series DVD, speculation persists as to whether or not this episode exists.
4	"The Lost Baby"	10:05	October 11, 1952
Ralph and Ed care for an abandoned baby found on the bus.
5	"The Quiz Show"	11:29	October 18, 1952
Ralph and Alice are contestants on a radio quiz show. This is a remake of "The Quiz Show" (December 14, 1951).
6	"Question Mark (a.k.a. Masquerade a.k.a. Halloween Party)"	8:52	October 25, 1952
The Kramdens and Nortons dress up for a Halloween party.
7	"Cold"	7:58	November 1, 1952
While nursing Ralph to health, Alice reveals she has taken out an insurance policy on him. Note: This is one of the few Honeymooners episodes where Carney is absent in his role as Norton.
8	"The Pickles"	7:16	November 8, 1952
Alice starts eating pickles after a doctor's visit, leading Ralph to think she is pregnant.
9	"Jellybeans"	8:27	November 22, 1952
Ralph buys thousands of jelly beans in the hopes of winning a $100 prize.
10	"The Missing Pair of Pants"	10:10	December 6, 1952
Not available. This sketch is still considered lost.
11	"Six Months to Live"	13:51	December 13, 1952
Ralph mistakenly believes that he has six months to live.
12	"Christmas Party"	42:25	December 20, 1952
The Kramdens have a Christmas party and several of Gleason's other characters drop in. In this second of three versions of the holiday episode, actress/singer Patricia Morison (a friend of Trixie's during her time in burlesque) sings two songs and a young Frankie Avalon performs a combination trumpet solo/tap dance.
13	"Glow Worm Cleaning"	10:02	January 3, 1953; According to the book The Honeymooners Lost Episodes by Donna McCrohan and Peter Crescenti, the air date should be June 27, 1953.
Alice is offered the chance to appear in a magazine ad, but Ralph is jealous.
14	"Alice Plays Cupid"	12:04	January 17, 1953
Ralph sabotages Alice's efforts to play matchmaker between a friend of hers and Ralph's traffic manager from work.
15	"Suspense"	10:47	January 24, 1953
When Ralph overhears Alice rehearsing for a play, he becomes convinced she wants to kill him.
16	"Lost Job"	9:07	January 31, 1953
Ralph finds a pink slip in his paycheck.
17	"Anniversary Gift"	10:25	February 21, 1953
Ralph scrambles to find Alice a new anniversary gift after she gets the same gift from Trixie.
18	"Income Tax"	10:46	March 7, 1953
Ralph owes the IRS $15, exactly the amount of money he has saved for a new bowling ball.
19	"Alice's Aunt Ethel"	9:23	March 14, 1953
When Alice's aunt arrives for a visit, Ralph is forced to sleep in the kitchen.
20	"What's Her Name?"	7:13	March 21, 1953
Ralph and Alice struggle to remember the name of an actress from a film they just watched.
21	"Lunch Box"	9:16	March 28, 1953
Ralph gripes about the lunch Alice packed for him, only to find out he had someone else's lunchbox.
22	"Easter Hats"	9:50	April 4, 1953
Not available. This sketch is still considered lost.
23	"Hot Tips"	11:20	April 11, 1953
Ralph is accused of being a bookie when he starts collecting bets for people before going to the racetrack.
24	"Norton Moves In"	12:10	April 18, 1953
The Nortons stay with the Kramdens while their apartment is being painted.
25	"Ralph's Diet"	11:39	April 25, 1953
While struggling with a new diet, Ralph discovers some hidden food in the apartment.
26	"The Dinner Guest"	9:56	May 2, 1953
Alice interrupts all of Ralph's attempts to discuss a promotion with his supervisor.
27	"Manager of the Baseball Team"	9:59	May 9, 1953
Ralph is about to be named manager of the bus company's baseball team, but thinks he is going to be named manager of the company.
28	"Alice's Birthday"	14:50	May 16, 1953
Not available. This sketch is still considered lost.
29	"The Dorsey Brothers Show"	34:57	May 23, 1953
An early version of 1953's "New Year's Eve Party".
30	"The Prowler"	11:12	June 6, 1953
Ralph tries his best to protect Alice from a neighborhood prowler.
31	"Guest Speaker"	13:41	June 13, 1953
Ralph frets after being asked to speak at the next Raccoon Lodge meeting.
32	"Vacation at Fred's Landing"	31:16	June 27, 1953; According to the book The Honeymooners Lost Episodes by Donna McCrohan and Peter Crescenti, the air date should be June 20, 1953.
The Kramdens and Nortons go fishing, and are miserable the whole time.

=== Season 2 (1953–54) ===
No.	Title	Duration	Original release date
1	"Sprained Thumb (a.k.a. "Bus Accident")"	12:43	September 19, 1953
This is a second version of the sketch originally broadcast on October 4, 1952.
2	"Lucky Number"	16:27	September 26, 1953
Ralph wins a $1,000 prize at a baseball game he skipped work to attend.
3	"Hot Dog Stand"	35:13	October 10, 1953
Ralph and Norton try to collect enough money to open a hot dog stand in New Jersey.
4	"Two Tickets to the Fight"	10:52	October 24, 1953
Ralph and Norton's plans to attend a boxing match are upset when Alice's uncle George pays a visit.
5	"Halloween Party"	9:22	October 31, 1953
Ralph ruins his tuxedo for a Halloween party at the bus company, not realizing that it's not a costume party.
6	"Champagne and Caviar"	14:44	November 7, 1953
By impressing his boss too much, Ralph unwittingly blows his chance at a raise.
7	"Letter to the Boss"	32:35	November 14, 1953
Ralph writes a nasty letter to his boss after he thinks he's been fired. Included are two faint spells from Ralph:#1: Break dance style, and #2: falling flat onto Mr. Marshall's office floor (cartwheel faint).
8	"Finger Man"	11:51	November 28, 1953
Ralph becomes a hero after helping to apprehend a wanted killer, but panics when the killer escapes from jail.
9	"Santa and the Bookies"	35:02	December 12, 1953
Ralph takes a job as a sidewalk Santa to earn extra money, but it turns out to be a front for illegal bookmakers.
10	"Christmas Party"	35:54	December 19, 1953
After Alice sends Ralph out for potato salad, the Kramdens' apartment is visited by a host of Jackie Gleason's colorful characters. This third and last version of the holiday episode features Frances Langford (another friend of Trixie's) singing two songs, and Eddie Hodges singing "Walkin' My Baby Back Home".
11	"New Year's Eve Party"	37:15	December 26, 1953
Ralph has no intention of going out on New Year's Eve, until the Kramdens and Nortons receive an invitation from The Dorsey Brothers.
12	"This Is Your Life"	37:43	January 16, 1954
Ralph's jealousy ruins his shot at an appearance on This Is Your Life.
13	"Cottage for Sale"	39:42	January 23, 1954
Ralph and Norton convince their wives to let them buy a cottage in the country, but it turns out to be a nightmare.
14	"Lawsuit"	15:08	March 27, 1954
After breaking his leg in a bus accident, Ralph tries to sue the bus company.
15	"Fortune Teller"	34:51	April 3, 1954
Ralph reluctantly allows a fortune teller to read his palm, and is determined to find out what it is after she stops.
16	"The Next Champ"	37:35	April 10, 1954
Ralph decides to manage a young boxer, who ends up moving in with the Kramdens.
17	"Stand in for Murder"	42:48 (with recap segment from April 24, 1954)	April 17, 1954
Ralph is offered a phony job as an insurance executive, so that he can be killed instead of a mob boss who looks just like him. Unfinished episode.
18	"Move Uptown"	36:58	April 24, 1954
Ralph tries to get kicked out of his apartment so he can rent a nicer one in The Bronx.
19	"The Man in the Blue Suit"	34:30	May 1, 1954
When Alice gives away a jacket that contains Ralph's poker winnings, he and Norton scheme to get it back.
20	"Hair Raising Tale"	37:31	May 8, 1954
Ralph and Norton get suckered into buying the formula for a miracle hair restorer.
21	"What's the Name?"	8:21	May 15, 1954
This is a remake of "What's Her Name?" (March 21, 1953).
22	"Box Top Kid"	40:27	May 22, 1954
Ralph wins a trip to Europe by penning a new slogan for Slim-O Bread, but loses it when they find out he didn't lose weight eating it.
23	"Two Men on a Horse"	38:43	May 29, 1954
Ralph gets elected treasurer of the Raccoon Lodge, and promptly loses $200 of their money. He and Norton head to the race track and invent a scheme to win it all back.
24	"Goodbye, Aunt Ethel"	41:44	June 5, 1954
This is an expanded version of a sketch that was originally broadcast on March 14, 1953. The longer storyline involves Ralph's plan to get Aunt Ethel out of his home by marrying her off to the local butcher.
25	"Vacation at Fred's Landing"	31:00	June 19, 1954
This is the third version of the sketch originally broadcast on May 30, 1952.

=== Season 3 (1954–55) ===
No.	Title	Duration	Original release date
1	"Ralph's Sweet Tooth"	35:39	September 25, 1954
Ralph has been selected to appear on a live commercial for Choosy Chews candy bars, but he develops a toothache (that becomes exceptionally painful when he bites into one of the bars) the night before the broadcast.
2	"Game Called on Account of Marriage"	33:50	October 2, 1954
Ralph has tickets to the World Series, but Alice demands that he attend her sister's wedding on the same day.
3	"Love Letter"	37:46	October 16, 1954
Ralph finds a love letter Norton wrote to Trixie years ago and believes it was sent to Alice from another man. NOTE: This version of "Love Letter" is the most recently-discovered "Honeymooners" sketch (in 2004).
4	"The People's Choice (Finger Man)"	40:01	October 23, 1954
When Ralph becomes a local hero after helping to nab an escaped convict, he is seduced by a couple of crooked political bosses into running for the city council.
5	"Halloween Party"	Lost	October 30, 1954
This is a remake of the previous season's "Halloween Party".
6	"Battle of the Sexes"	35:28	November 13, 1954
Ed moves in with Ralph and Alice moves in with Trixie after domestic battles in the Kramden and Norton households.
7	"Teamwork Beat the Clock"	32:08	November 20, 1954
Ralph and Alice are contestants on Beat the Clock. Bud Collyer guest stars.
8	"The Brother-in-Law"	34:47	November 27, 1954
Bad advice from Ralph's brother-in-law results in the Kramdens and Nortons investing in a run-down hotel.
9	"Songwriters"	35:54	December 11, 1954
Ralph and Norton form a songwriting partnership.
10	"Santa and the Bookies"	31:08	December 18, 1954
This is a remake of a sketch originally broadcast on December 12, 1953.
11	"Kramden vs. Norton"	33:55	January 15, 1955
Ralph sues Norton over ownership of a television set Norton won in a movie theatre raffle.
12	"A Promotion"	38:57	January 22, 1955
Ralph finally receives a promotion (he is now the first assistant cashier to the assistant cashier of the bus company), but a mishap causes him to be labeled as a thief after his first day on the job.
13	"The Hypnotist"	38:23	January 29, 1955
Ralph asks a fellow Raccoon, who is a hypnotist, to get Alice to show him her stash of money so that he may take it to the Raccoon convention in Chicago.
14	"Cupid"	39:21	February 5, 1955
Ralph tries to help out a lonely old friend by setting him up with a blind date, but the gossip grapevine leads Alice to believe that Ralph is trying to land dates for himself.
15	"A Little Man Who Wasn't There"	38:07	February 12, 1955
Ralph sees a psychiatrist in an effort to control his short temper, but he is dismayed when the doctor suggests the best cure would be to sever his friendship with Norton.
16	"Hero"	39:45	February 19, 1955
Ralph's big mouth lands him in trouble again when he makes idle boasts to a fatherless boy who idolizes him.
17	"The Great Jewel Robbery"	37:30	February 26, 1955
Ralph takes up a collection to buy an expensive watch as a wedding present for his boss's daughter, but Alice finds the watch and thinks it is a birthday present for her.
18	"Peacemaker"	35:15	March 5, 1955
Ralph loses a night's sleep trying to patch up a quarrel between Ed and Trixie.
19	"The Adoption"	37:05	March 26, 1955
Ralph and Alice adopt a baby.
20	"Stars Over Flatbush"	37:05	April 2, 1955
Ralph and Norton take an interest in astrology, and it affects every decision Ralph makes.
21	"One Big Happy Family"	37:38	April 9, 1955
The Kramdens and Nortons decide to share an apartment in order to save living expenses.
22	"A Weighty Problem"	37:52	April 16, 1955
Ralph must lose weight fast in order to pass a bus company physical. NOTE: several sources erroneously list the running time as 48:09.
23	"Boys and Girls Together"	36:30	April 23, 1955
The wives demand that the boys spend more time with them, so Ralph and Norton scheme to exhaust the girls with a wild night on the town.
24	"Principle of the Thing"	34:09	April 30, 1955
When the building landlord (Jack Benny in a surprise cameo) refuses to make repairs to the Kramden apartment, Ralph withholds the rent money and spends it on some garish redecorating.
25	"Songs and Witty Sayings"	38:39	May 14, 1955
The husbands and wives rehearse separate acts for a local talent show. Among the highlights of the boys' act is a tribute to Laurel & Hardy.
26	"Letter to the Boss"	31:38	May 21, 1955
This is a second version of the sketch originally broadcast on November 14, 1953.
27	"Stand in for Murder"	41:58	June 4, 1955
This is a second, completed version of the sketch originally broadcast on April 17, 1954.

=== Season 4 (1956–57) ===
No.	Title	Duration	Original release date
1	"Double Anniversary Party"	13:06	October 13, 1956
Ralph and Alice plan surprise anniversary parties for each other.
2	"The Check-Up"	9:50	October 20, 1956
Ralph, angered when Alice wants to supposedly waste money on life insurance, fakes being an alcoholic when a doctor pays a house call.
3	"Forgot to Register"	13:41	October 27, 1956
Ralph and Norton campaign for a local politician.
4	"Expectant Father"	15:57	November 3, 1956
Ralph sees Alice going into an obstetrician's office and thinks she is pregnant.
5	"Goodnight, Sweet Prince"	15:27	November 10, 1956
Ralph is working the night shift and cannot sleep amidst the daytime noises of the neighborhood.
6	"Two Family Car"	17:27	November 17, 1956
Ralph and Norton believe they have won a car in a raffle.
7	"Love Letter"	36:48	November 24, 1956
Ralph finds a love letter Ed wrote to Trixie years ago and believes it was sent to Alice from another man. NOTE: This is a second version of the sketch originally broadcast on October 16, 1954.
8	"Finders Keepers"	37:08	December 8, 1956
Ralph and Norton want to buy a local candy store and go to wild extremes trying to win a radio contest to pay for it.
9	"Catch a Star"	36:41	December 15, 1956
Ralph boasts that he is a good friend of Jackie Gleason and is trapped into booking Gleason for the Raccoon dance. Gleason, Carney, Meadows and Randolph appear in dual roles as their characters and themselves.
10	"My Fair Landlord"	36:01	January 19, 1957
The Kramdens and Nortons buy a duplex home in Queens, with disastrous results.
11	"Away We Go"	49:12	February 2, 1957
The Kramdens and Nortons leave on a cruise ship to begin a free trip around the world after winning a breakfast cereal contest.
12	"Plastered in Paris"	49:02	February 9, 1957
While in Paris, Ralph and Ed are arrested for passing counterfeit money.
13	"Behind the Iron Curtain"	48:04	February 16, 1957
While in Germany, Ralph and Ed accidentally wander into the Russian section of Berlin and are taken prisoners for being suspected spies.
14	"When in Rome"	48:01	February 23, 1957
Ralph is jealous of Alice's tourist guide in Italy, not knowing the guide is a little boy whom Ralph misnames "Harry Verderchi."
15	"Curse of the Kramdens"	48:32	March 2, 1957
Ralph and Norton are forced into spending the night in the (supposed) haunted ancestral Kramden castle while visiting Ireland.
16	"Mad Dogs and Englishmen"	49:02	March 9, 1957
The Kramdens and Nortons appear in a Flakey Wakey commercial on an English television show.
17	"Framed in Spain"	52:27	April 6, 1957
Blackmailers fake a photo of Ralph fooling around with a Spanish local in Madrid, making Alice jealous.
18	"I Remember Mau Au"	50:35	April 13, 1957
The Kramdens and Nortons go on safari in Africa, giving Ralph and Ed the chance to go hunting.
19	"Six Months to Live"	Lost	May 11, 1957
This is the third version of the sketch originally performed on December 13, 1952.
20	"Manager of the Baseball Team"	10:36	June 1, 1957
This is the third version of this sketch, previously performed on May 16, 1952 and May 9, 1953: it was reworked a fourth time as "The New Manager" on April 19, 1969. NOTES: Final appearance of Gleason, Meadows, Carney and Randolph together. The Jackie Gleason Show aired for three more weeks until June 22, 1957.

=== Season 5 (1966–67) ===
No.	Title	Duration	Original release date
1	"In Twenty-Five Words or Less"	TBA	September 17, 1966
This is a remake of "Box Top Kid" (May 22, 1954).
2	"Ship of Fools"	TBA	October 1, 1966
This is a remake of "Away We Go" (February 2, 1957).
3	"Poor People in Paris"	TBA	October 8, 1966
This is a remake of "Plastered in Paris" (February 9, 1957).
4	"Confusion - Italian Style"	TBA	October 15, 1966
This is a remake of "When in Rome" (February 23, 1957).
5	"The Curse of the Kramdens"	TBA	October 29, 1966
This is a remake of "Curse of the Kramdens" (March 2, 1957).
6	"The Honeymooners in England"	TBA	November 12, 1966
This is a remake of "Mad Dogs and Englishmen" (March 9, 1957).
7	"You're in the Picture"	TBA	November 19, 1966
This is a remake of "Framed in Spain" (April 6, 1957).
8	"We Spy"	TBA	December 3, 1966
This is a remake of "Behind the Iron Curtain" (February 16, 1957).
9	"Petticoat Jungle"	TBA	December 10, 1966
This is a remake of "I Remember Mau Au" (April 13, 1957).
10	"Run, Santa, Run"	TBA	December 17, 1966
This is a remake of "Santa and the Bookies" (December 12, 1953, and December 19, 1954).
11	"King of the Castle"	TBA	January 7, 1967
This is a remake of "Battle of the Sexes" (November 13, 1954).
12	"Movies Are Better Than Ever"	TBA	January 14, 1967
This is a remake of "Kramden vs. Norton" (January 15, 1955).
13	"Without Reservations"	TBA	February 4, 1967
This is a remake of "Brother in Law" (November 1954).
14	"Life Upon the Wicked Stage"	n/a	February 11, 1967
This is a remake of "Songs and Witty Sayings" (May 14, 1955). Due to music rights issues, this episode is not available on DVD.
15	"Rififi, Brooklyn Style"	TBA	March 4, 1967
This is a remake of "The Great Jewel Robbery" (February 26, 1955).
16	"Ralph Kramden Presents"	TBA	March 18, 1967
This is a remake of "Catch a Star" (December 15, 1956).
17	"Flushing Ho"	TBA	April 15, 1967
This is a remake of "One Big Happy Family" (April 9, 1955).
18	"Sees All, Knows All"	TBA	April 22, 1967
This is a remake of "Fortune Teller" (April 3, 1954).

=== Season 6 (1967–68) ===
No.	Title	Duration	Original release date
1	"Be It Ever So Humble"	TBA	September 9, 1967
This is a remake of "My Fair Landlord" (January 19, 1957).
2	"Hair to a Fortune"	TBA	September 16, 1967
This is a remake of "Hair Raising Tale" (May 8, 1954).
3	"The People's Choice"	TBA	September 23, 1967
This is a remake of "Finger Man" (November 28, 1953) and "The People's Choice" (October 23, 1954).
4	"Two for the Money"	TBA	October 7, 1967
This is a remake of "Two Men on a Horse" (May 29, 1954).
5	"Nephew of the Bride"	TBA	October 21, 1967
This is a remake of "Goodbye Aunt Ethel" (June 5, 1954).
6	"Out of Sight, Out of Mind"	TBA	November 4, 1967
This is a remake of "A Little Man Who Wasn't There" (February 12, 1955).
7	"Two Faces of Ralph Kramden"	TBA	November 18, 1967
This is a remake of "Stand-In for Murder" (April 17, 1954, and June 4, 1955).
8	"The Main Event"	TBA	December 2, 1967
This is a remake of "The Next Champ" (April 10, 1954).
9	"To Whom It May Concern"	TBA	December 16, 1967
This is a remake of "Letter to the Boss" (November 14, 1953, and May 21, 1955).

=== Season 7 (1968–69) ===
No.	Title	Duration	Original release date
1	"Sleepy Time Gal"	TBA	September 28, 1968
This is a remake of "The Hypnotist" (January 29, 1955).
2	"The Boy Next Door"	TBA	October 12, 1968
This is a remake of "Love Letter" (October 16, 1954, and November 24, 1956).
3	"Six Months To Live"	TBA	November 23, 1968
This is the fourth version of the sketch originally performed on December 13, 1952
4	"Alice's Birthday"	15:00	December 7, 1968
This is a remake of "Alice's Birthday" (May 16, 1953).
5	"Follow the Boys"	TBA	December 26, 1968
This is a remake of "Boys and Girls Together" (April 23, 1955).
6	"Lawsuit"	TBA	January 4, 1969
This is a remake of "Lawsuit" (March 27, 1954).
7	"Hot Tip"	11:00	February 8, 1969
This is a remake of "Hot Tips" (April 11, 1953).
8	"The New Bowling Ball"	10:00	March 22, 1969
This is a remake of "The New Bowling Ball" (September 20, 1952).
9	"Norton Moves In"	12:00	April 5, 1969
This is a remake of "Norton Moves In" (April 18, 1953).
10	"The New Manager"	10:00	April 19, 1969
This is a remake of "Manager of the Baseball Team" (May 9, 1953, and June 1, 1957).

=== Season 8 (1969–70) ===
No.	Title	Duration	Original release date
1	"Play It Again, Norton"	TBA	September 27, 1969
The Honeymooners wreak havoc on a cross-country tour. Ralph and Ed enter a song contest.
2	"Ralph Goes Hollywood"	TBA	October 4, 1969
The Honeymooners head to Hollywood to claim their songwriting prize.
3	"The Mexican Hat Trick"	TBA	October 11, 1969
The Honeymooners head to Mexico. Alice and Trixie are kidnapped.
4	"Case of the Cuckoo Thief"	TBA	October 18, 1969
A Hollywood shopping spree turns chaotic when Alice is set up in a shoplifting scam.
5	"The Honeymoon Is Over"	TBA	November 1, 1969
Ralph, Alice, Ed and Trixie are asked to appear on The Mike Douglas Show to promote their song "Love on a Bus". Ralph and Alice get into an argument while on the show.
6	"Happiness Is a Rich Uncle"	TBA	November 8, 1969
Ralph and Alice test Alice's Uncle Howard's go-go girlfriend, to make sure she's not in it for the money.
7	"Hawaii, Oh Oh"	TBA	November 15, 1969
The Honeymooners visit Hawaii.
8	"The Sun and Raccoon Capital"	TBA	November 22, 1969
The Honeymooners visit Miami where Ralph and Ed vie for High Exalted Mystic Ruler.
9	"The Match Game"	TBA	November 29, 1969
In Chicago, a computer-match service has the Nortons clicking and the Kramdens not.
10	"Double Trouble"	TBA	December 6, 1969
The Honeymooners visit Sun Valley, Idaho. Ralph has yet another doppelganger; this time, it is a check bouncer who is using his name.
11	"We're Off to See the Wizard"	TBA	February 21, 1970
At Mardi Gras, a hotel mix-up leads the foursome to stay with Emma, Norton's distant relative, a phony spiritualist. NOTE: At the end of this show, Gleason explains that a nut from the audience ran up on stage and Sammy Spear had to lead him out of the auditorium.
12	"Operation Protest"	TBA	February 28, 1970
Returning from his cross-country trip promoting the film Love on a Bus, Ralph is offered a promotion within the Gotham Bus Company, but trouble erupts when Alice's nephew starts picketing their headquarters. NOTE: This is the last episode of the "Color Honeymooners".

== The Jackie Gleason Special (1960) ==
The following is a TV special.

No.	Title	Duration	Original release date
1	"The Big Sell: A Jackie Gleason Special"	TBA	October 9, 1960
Ralph seeks Norton to invest money in his future.

== The American Scene Magazine (1962–66) ==
The following is a listing of "Honeymooners" sketches that aired on The American Scene Magazine on CBS.

No.	Title	Duration	Original release date
1	"Two Below"	15:35	September 29, 1962
Ralph convinces Ed to get more involved in civil defense and spend a week in the basement instead of vacationing with Alice and Trixie in Atlantic City. Once in the basement, hilarity ensues when Ralph and Ed try to sleep in bunk beds. Sue Ane Langdon appears as Alice and Patricia Wilson appears as Trixie.
2	"TV Game of the Week"	TBA	October 20, 1962
Ralph finally gives in and buys a television set and he and Norton try to watch a football game.
3	"The Adoption"	52:00	January 8, 1966
Musical remake of March 26, 1955. Anxious to adopt a baby, Ralph and Alice go to great lengths to impress the adoption agency, even passing off expensive borrowed furniture as their own. Touched by the Kramdens' honesty, arrangements are made to locate a child for them. Ralph erupts when the baby turns out to be a "Ralphina" but the Kramden's happiness is short-lived when the birth mother wants her baby back. Audrey Meadows returns as Alice for the first time since June 1, 1957, and would not appear again until February 2, 1976. This is the first of the Jerry Bresler and Lyn Duddy musical "Honeymooners" that would continue on through the 1966–70 "Color Honeymooners". This is the last episode filmed in black and white.

== The Jackie Gleason Specials (1970–2002) ==
The following is a listing of "Honeymooners" Specials.

No.	Title	Duration	Original release date
1	"Jackie Gleason Special"	Lost	December 20, 1970
2	"General Electric Presents The Jackie Gleason Show Special: Honeymooners segment - Women's Lib"	25:20	October 11, 1973
When Trixie brings down a copy of Plaything magazine to show Alice a questionnaire, Alice now questions if she is an equal to Ralph. Ralph and Alice fight and Alice moves upstairs with Trixie and it is Ralph and Ed on their own. This is Sheila MacRae's final appearance as Alice.
3	"Julie & Jackie: How Sweet It Is"	25:20	May 22, 1974
This special with Julie Andrews and Gleason features these two classic talents in familiar Gleason sketches including Joe the Bartender, The Poor Soul, Reggie van Gleason and The Honeymooners, with Andrews playing Norton. This is the only time Gleason portrayed Ralph Kramden along someone else playing Ed Norton.
4	"The Honeymooners Second Honeymoon"	48:00	February 2, 1976
The Kramdens are celebrating their 25th wedding anniversary. Ralph and Alice plan on renewing their vows in a special ceremony at the Raccoon lodge. The celebration is put on hold when Ralph believes Alice is pregnant. Norton then comes into the picture to teach Ralph how to take care of a baby. Meadows returns as Alice, her first time since 1966's "The Adoption".
5	"The Honeymooners Christmas Special"	48:00	November 28, 1977
Ralph agrees to produce, direct and star in his boss, Mr. Marshall's wife's annual fundraising Christmas benefit show, "A Christmas Carol". Problems arise when Ralph realizes he has promised to take Alice to Miami the same weekend as the show. Hilarity ensues when Ralph rewrites the Dickens classic and with Norton directing it is bound to be a hit. When the show is a hit, all is forgiven.
6	"The Honeymooners Valentine Special"	48:00	February 13, 1978
Alice is secretly planning to buy Ralph a suit for Valentine's Day, but Ralph thinks she is sizing him to fit for a coffin after he finds a new life-insurance policy. Thinking that Alice is seeing another man, Ralph has Norton join him undercover, dressed in drag, to catch the bum. In the end, Ralph buys Alice an all-electric kitchen with a new TV, stove, refrigerator, washer, and dryer.
7	"Jackie Gleason's Honeymooners Christmas"	48:00	December 10, 1978
It is Christmastime and Ralph's latest get-rich-quick scheme has him risking his and Alice's life savings, Norton's holiday bonus, and his mother-in-law's Social Security check. This is the final new episode featuring the actors playing their roles in character -- future specials are clip shows, hosted by the Honeymooners actors as themselves. NOTE: recorded in Atlantic City, New Jersey.
8	"The Honeymooners Reunion"	47:30	May 13, 1985
Clip show featuring "Lost Episodes" hosted by Gleason and Meadows on a recreation of the original set.
9	"The Honeymooners Anniversary Celebration"	99:00	October 18, 1985
10	"The Honeymooners 35th Anniversary Special"	30:00	October 12, 1990
Hosted by Audrey Meadows.
11	"The Honeymooners Really Lost Debut Episodes"	60:00	May 26, 1994
Hosted by Paul Reiser.
12	"The Honeymooners 50th Anniversary Celebration"	60:00	May 6, 2002
