= Valerie Harper =

American actress (1939–2019)

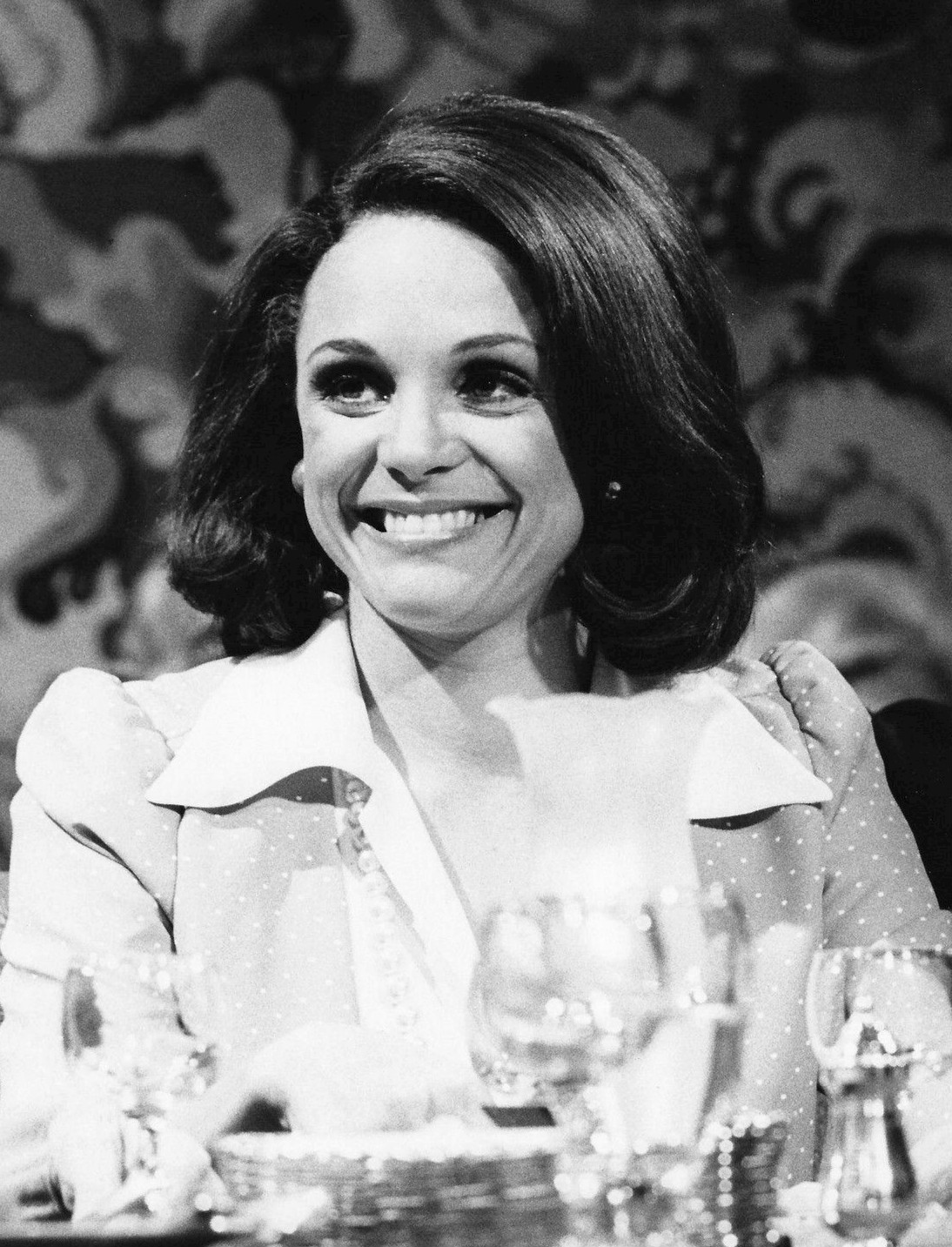
- Harper in 1974
- Born: Valerie Kathryn Harper; August 22, 1939; Suffern, New York, U.S.
- Died: August 30, 2019 (aged 80); Los Angeles, California, U.S.
- Resting place: Hollywood Forever Cemetery, Los Angeles
- Occupations: Actress; comedian; dancer; writer
- Years active: 1956–2019
- Spouses: Richard Schaal (m. 1964; div. 1978); Tony Cacciotti (m. 1987)
- Children: 1
- Website: Official website

Valerie Kathryn Harper (August 22, 1939 – August 30, 2019) was an American actress. She began her career as a dancer on Broadway, making her debut as a replacement in the musical Li'l Abner. She played Rhoda Morgenstern on The Mary Tyler Moore Show (1970–1977) and its spin-off Rhoda (1974–1978). For her work on Mary Tyler Moore, she received the Primetime Emmy Award for Outstanding Supporting Actress in a Comedy Series three times, and later received the award for Outstanding Lead Actress in a Comedy Series for Rhoda.

Her film appearances include supporting roles in Freebie and the Bean (1974) and Chapter Two (1979), both of which garnered her Golden Globe Award nominations.

From 1986 to 1987, Harper appeared as Valerie Hogan on the sitcom Valerie, from which she was fired after two seasons. Her character was killed off, and the show was retitled Valerie's Family and eventually The Hogan Family. Actress Sandy Duncan was cast in a new role that served as a replacement for Harper's character.

Harper returned to stage work in her later career, appearing in several Broadway productions. In 2010, she was nominated for the Tony Award for Best Actress in a Play for her performance as Tallulah Bankhead in the play Looped.

== Early life ==
Harper was born on August 22, 1939, in Suffern, New York, the daughter of Iva Mildred (née McConnell) and Howard Donald Harper. Her father was a traveling lighting salesman; her mother was born (and raised) in Dalmeny, Saskatchewan, before becoming a teacher and later training as a nurse. Her parents married in Alberta before her mother immigrated to the United States. Harper was the middle child of three, between her sister Leanne and her brother Merrill, who later took the name "Don". After her parents' divorce in 1957, she also had a half-sister, Virginia, from her father's second marriage to Angela Posillico (1933–1996).

She stated that her parents were expecting a boy. But after her birth, her first and middle names were derived from tennis players Valerie Scott and Kay Stammers, who were victorious doubles partners at a tournament Harper's father was attending on the day she was born. Her father was of English and French-Canadian ancestry and her mother was of French-Canadian, Irish, Scottish, and Welsh ancestry. Harper based her character Rhoda Morgenstern on her Italian-American stepmother and Penny Ann Green (née Joanna Greenberg), with whom she danced in the Broadway musical Wildcat. She was raised Catholic and attended several Catholic schools during her childhood, although at an early age she quit attending church.

Harper's family moved frequently throughout her childhood due to her father's work. When she was two years old, shortly after her brother was born, the family relocated from Northampton, Massachusetts to South Orange, New Jersey, where she enrolled in childhood dance classes. When Harper was in first grade, the family relocated again to California, living in Altadena and Pasadena before briefly residing in Monroe, Michigan. In 1951, the family settled in Ashland, Oregon, where Harper attended junior high school for three years. "During those years in Oregon, Dad was gone on more frequent and more lengthy road trips," Harper recalled. "As a result, Mom was alone a lot, so much that she was virtually a single parent."

After she completed junior high school in Oregon, the family moved again to Jersey City, New Jersey, where Harper attended Lincoln High School. before graduating from the private Young Professionals School on West 56th Street, where classmates included Sal Mineo, Tuesday Weld, and Carol Lynley.

== Career ==
=== Broadway dancer and improv ===
Harper began her show business career as a dancer and chorus girl on Broadway, and went on to perform in several Broadway shows, some choreographed by Michael Kidd, including Wildcat (starring Lucille Ball), Li'l Abner, Take Me Along (starring Jackie Gleason), and Subways Are for Sleeping. She was also cast in the musical Destry Rides Again, but was forced to leave rehearsals due to illness. She returned to Broadway in February 2010, playing Tallulah Bankhead in Matthew Lombardo's Looped at the Lyceum Theatre.

Harper had bit parts in Rock, Rock, Rock! (1956) and the film version of Li'l Abner (1959), where she played a Yokumberry Tonic wife. She broke into television on a 1963 episode of the soap opera The Doctors ("Zip Guns Can Kill"), and was an extra in Love with the Proper Stranger (1963). She was in the ensemble cast of Paul Sills' Story Theatre and toured with Second City along with then-husband Richard Schaal, Linda Lavin, and others, later appearing in sketches on Playboy After Dark in 1969. She performed several characters in a comedy LP record, When You're in Love the Whole World is Jewish (1965), which included the popular novelty single, The Ballad of Irving, a recitation by TV announcer Frank Gallop. Harper and Schaal moved to Los Angeles in 1968, and co-wrote an episode of Love, American Style.

=== Television and film ===
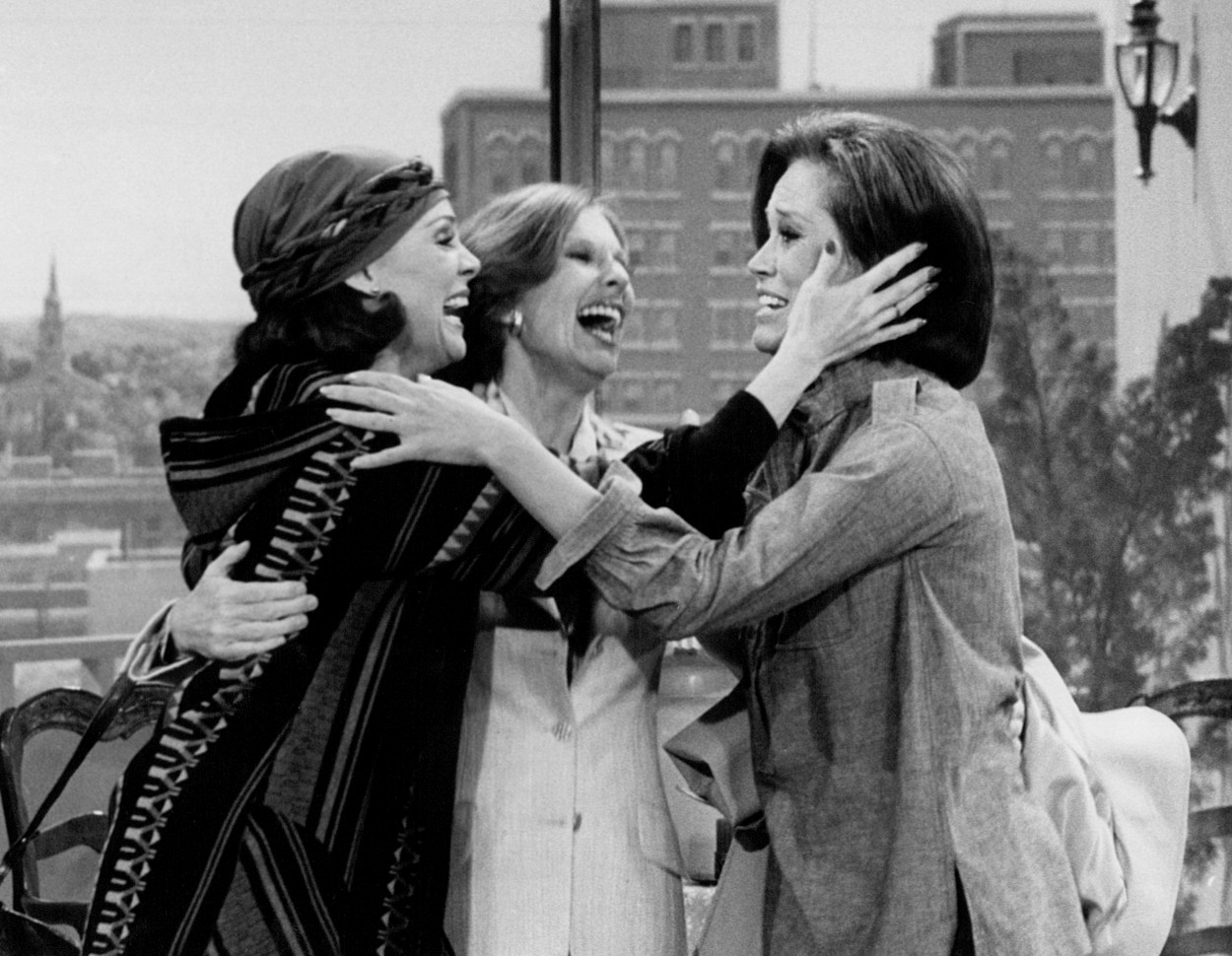
Harper with Mary Tyler Moore and Cloris Leachman in the final episode of The Mary Tyler Moore Show (1977)

Richard Schaal and Harper wrote "Love and the Visitor" (1970) for Love, American Style, a TV romantic comedy series.

While doing theater in Los Angeles in 1970, Harper was spotted by casting agent Ethel Winant, who called her in to audition for the role of Rhoda Morgenstern on The Mary Tyler Moore Show. She co-starred there from 1970 to 1974, then starred in the spinoff series Rhoda (CBS 1974–1978) in which her character returned to New York City.

She won four Emmy Awards and a Golden Globe Award for her work as Rhoda Morgenstern. The first season of Rhoda was released on DVD on April 21, 2009 by Shout! Factory.

Harper was nominated for a Golden Globe for "New Star of the Year" for her supporting role in Freebie and the Bean (1974), and was a guest star on The Muppet Show in the 20th episode of its first season in 1976. She had a starring role in the suspense movie Night Terror (1977), playing a murder witness who's pursued by the killer. She had a supporting role in the romantic comedy Chapter Two (1979), starring James Caan and Marsha Mason, and was nominated for a Golden Globe Award for Best Supporting Actress. She also starred as Maggie in a telefilm production of the Michael Cristofer play The Shadow Box (1980), directed by Paul Newman.

Harper returned to situation comedy in 1986 when she played family matriarch Valerie Hogan on the NBC series Valerie. Following a salary dispute with NBC and production company Lorimar in 1987, she was fired from the series at the end of its second season, (Note: Attributed to multiple references:) and she sued NBC and Lorimar for breach of contract. Her claims against NBC were dismissed, but the jury found that Lorimar had wrongfully fired her and awarded her $1.4 million plus 12.5% of the show's profits. The series continued without her, with the explanation that her character had died off-screen. In 1987, it was initially renamed Valerie's Family, then The Hogan Family, as Harper was replaced by Sandy Duncan, who played her sister-in-law Sandy Hogan.

Harper appeared in various television films, including guest roles on such series as Touched by an Angel (1996), Melrose Place (1998) ,Sex and the City (1999), and That 70's Show (2001).

In 2000, she reunited with Moore in Mary and Rhoda, a television film that reunited their characters in later life.

=== Later career ===
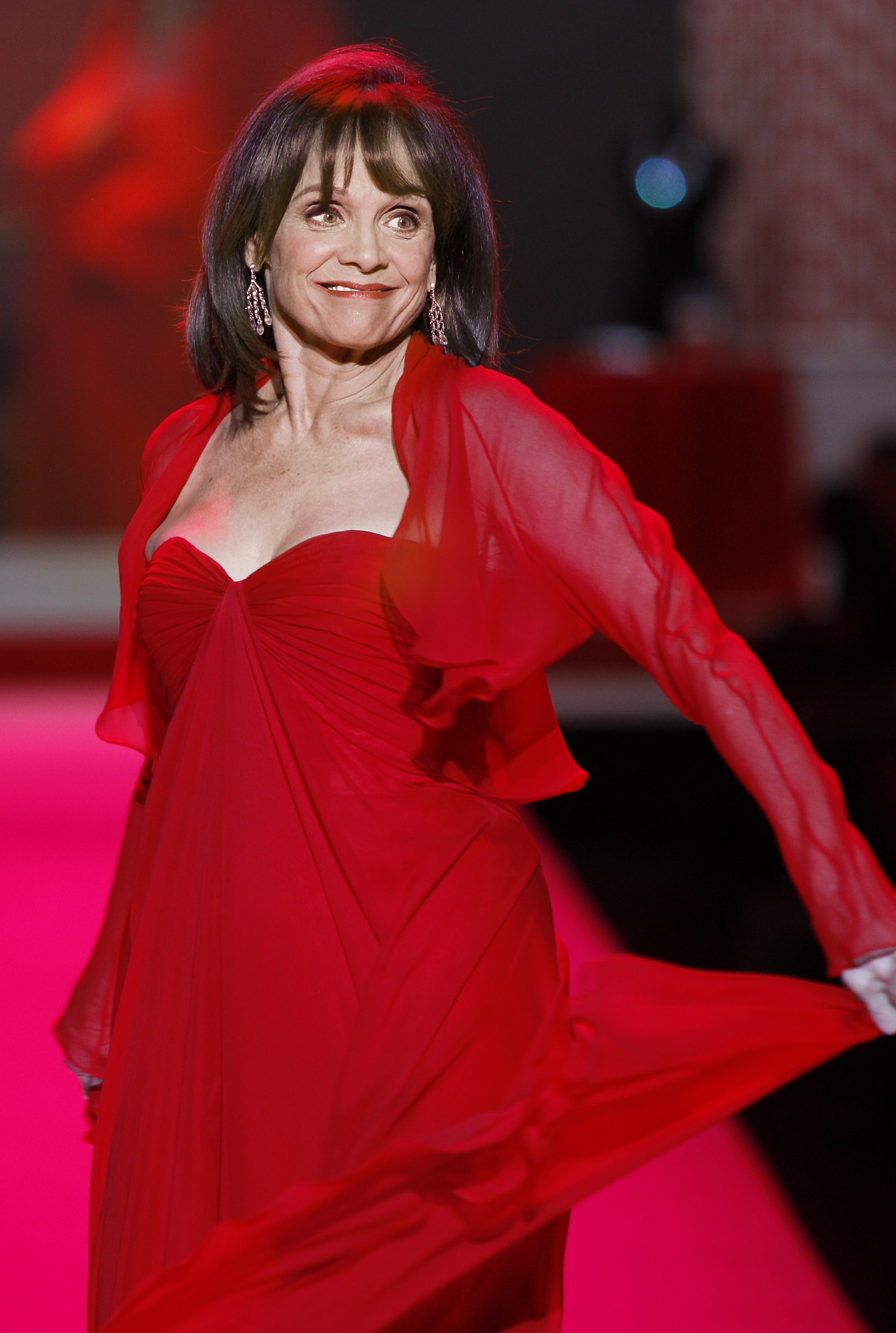
Harper at 2010 The Heart Truth

Harper was a member of the Screen Actors Guild (SAG) and ran for its presidency in 2001, losing to Melissa Gilbert. She served on SAG's Hollywood board of directors.

In 2005–2006, Harper portrayed Golda Meir in a United States national tour of the one-woman drama Golda's Balcony. A film of the production was released in 2007.

She played Tallulah Bankhead in the world-premiere production of Matthew Lombardo's Looped at the Pasadena Playhouse from June 27 to August 3, 2008. The show moved to Arena Stage in Washington, D.C., in 2009. It then briefly ran on Broadway at the Lyceum Theatre, from February 2010 (previews) through April 2010, for which Harper received a Tony Award nomination. She was to continue the role on a national tour beginning January 2013, but withdrew due to her health.

She played Claire Bremmer, aunt of Susan Delfino (Teri Hatcher), on ABC's Desperate Housewives in 2011.

On September 4, 2013, Harper was announced as a contestant for the 17th season of Dancing with the Stars, partnered with professional dancer Tristan MacManus. They were eliminated from the show on October 7, 2013.

One of Harper's final network television roles, in 2015, was a guest role as Nola on 2 Broke Girls, a show with a premise that mirrored the premise of The Mary Tyler Moore Show. Coincidentally, on Harper's own show Rhoda, Vivian Vance guest starred on Rhoda shortly before Vance's death, which mirrored Vance's breakout role of two best girlfriends portrayed in I Love Lucy.

Harper appeared as the character Wanda on the American comedy web television series Liza on Demand, in its July 11, 2018, episode: "Valentine's Day".

=== Activism and charity work ===
In the early 1970s, Harper was involved in the women's liberation movement and was an advocate of the Equal Rights Amendment. With Dennis Weaver she co-founded L.I.F.E. (Love Is Feeding Everyone) in 1983, a charity that fed thousands of needy people in Los Angeles.

On March 30, 2012, the Screen Actors Guild (SAG) and the American Federation of Television and Radio Artists (AFTRA) completed a merger of equals forming a new union SAG-AFTRA. As a result of this merger, a group of actors including Harper, fellow voice actors Michael Bell, Clancy Brown, Harper’s former stepdaughter Wendy Schaal, and other actors including former SAG President Edward Asner, Martin Sheen, Ed Harris, and Nancy Sinatra immediately sued against the current SAG President Ken Howard and several SAG Vice Presidents to overturn the merger and separate the (now merged) two unions because of their claims that the election was improper. The plaintiffs dropped their lawsuit several months later.

== Personal life ==
Harper's roommate in New York City was Arlene Golonka.

Harper married actor Richard Schaal in 1964. They divorced in 1978, after which she had a relationship with Peter Horton. She married Tony Cacciotti in 1987, after dating for seven years, and they adopted a daughter, Cristina.

Despite playing Jewish characters such as Rhoda Morgenstern, Harper herself was of British, Irish, and French-Canadian descent, and not Jewish.

In 2014, Harper appeared on The Howard Stern Show and while discussing her terminal illness, told Howard in private a secret code word that only the two of them would know, which could be used after her death to prove if psychics were real. This idea for a secret word was based on a pact Harry Houdini had made with his wife Bess where they promised each other that the first one to die would attempt to contact the surviving spouse from the afterlife, using a code the couple had created to verify any spiritualists or psychics claiming they had made contact. In December, 2024, magician and mentalist Oz Pearlman appeared on the Howard Stern Show and correctly guessed that the word was "curly."

== Illness and death ==
In 2009, Harper was diagnosed with lung cancer. She announced on March 6, 2013, that tests from a January hospital stay revealed she had leptomeningeal carcinomatosis, a rare condition where cancer cells spread into the meninges, the membranes surrounding the brain. She said that her doctors had given her as little as three months to live. Although the disease was considered incurable, her doctors said they were going to treat her with chemotherapy to try to slow its progress.

In April 2014, Harper said she was responding well to the treatment. On July 30, 2015, she was hospitalized in Maine after falling unconscious, and taken via medevac to a larger hospital for further treatment. She was later discharged.

In 2016, Harper's cancer treatment continued at Cedars-Sinai Medical Center, and she was well enough to appear in a short film, My Mom and the Girl, based on the experiences of director/writer Susie Singer Carter, whose mother has Alzheimer's disease. In September 2017, she said: "People are saying, 'She's on her way to death and quickly'. Now it's five years instead of three months... I'm going to fight this. I'm going to see a way." At the time, she was developing a television series with Carter.

By July 2019, she was on a regimen of "a multitude of medications and chemotherapy drugs" and was experiencing "extreme physical and painful challenges" that required "around-the-clock, 24/7 care." Harper died on the morning of August 30, 2019, in Los Angeles.

Harper is buried at Hollywood Forever Cemetery in Los Angeles, California.

== Filmography ==
=== Films ===
| Year | Title | Role | Notes |
|---|---|---|---|
| 1956 | Rock, Rock, Rock! | Dancer at Prom | Uncredited |
| 1959 | Li'l Abner | Luke's Wife | Uncredited |
| 1963 | Trash Program | Wife | Voice, uncredited |
| 1969 | With a Feminine Touch | | |
| 1973 | The Shape of Things | Herself | Television film |
| 1974 | Thursday's Game | Ann Menzente | Television film |
| 1974 | Freebie and the Bean | Consuelo | Nominated — Golden Globe Award for New Star of the Year – Actress |
| 1977 | Night Terror | Carol Turner | Television film |
| 1979 | Chapter Two | Faye Medwick | Nominated — Golden Globe Award for Best Supporting Actress – Motion Picture |
| 1980 | The Last Married Couple in America | Barbara | |
| 1980 | Fun and Games | Carol Hefferman | Television film |
| 1980 | The Shadow Box | Maggie | Television film |
| 1981 | The Day the Loving Stopped | Norma Danner | Television film |
| 1982 | Farrell for the People | Elizabeth "Liz" Farrell | Television film |
| 1982 | Don't Go to Sleep | Laura | Television film |
| 1983 | An Invasion of Privacy | Kate Bianchi | Television film |
| 1984 | Blame It on Rio | Karen Hollis | |
| 1985 | The Execution | Hannah Epstein | Television film |
| 1987 | Strange Voices | Lynn Glover | Television film |
| 1988 | Drop-Out Mother | Nora Cromwell | Television film |
| 1988 | The People Across the Lake | Rachel Yoman | Television film |
| 1989 | Hanna-Barbera's 50th: A Yabba Dabba Doo Celebration | Herself | Television film |
| 1990 | Stolen: One Husband | Katherine Slade | Television film |
| 1991 | Perry Mason: The Case of the Fatal Fashion | Dyan Draper | Television film |
| 1993 | The Poetry Hall of Fame | Herself | Television film |
| 1994 | A Friend to Die For | Mrs. Delvecchio | Television film |
| 1995 | The Great Mom Swap | Grace Venessi | Television film |
| 1997 | Dog's Best Friend | Chicken (voice) | Television film |
| 2000 | Mary and Rhoda | Rhoda Morgenstern-Rousseau | Television film |
| 2002 | Dancing at the Harvest Moon | Claire | Television film |
| 2007 | Golda's Balcony | Golda Meir | |
| 2011 | Shiver | Audrey Alden | |
| 2011 | My Future Boyfriend | Bobbi Moreau | Television film |
| 2011 | Fixing Pete | Mrs. Friedlander | Television film |
| 2011 | Certainty | Kathryn | |
| 2014 | The Town That Came A-Courtin' | Charlotte | Television film |
| 2015 | Merry Xmas | Mother | 7 minute short |
| 2016 | My Mom and the Girl | Norma/Nanny | 22 minute short |
| 2016 | Stars in Shorts: No Ordinary Love | Mother | Merry Xmas segment |

=== Television ===
| | Title | Role | Notes |
|---|---|---|---|
| 1963 | The Doctors | Mrs. Steiner | Episode: "Zip Guns Can Kill" |
| 1970–1977 | The Mary Tyler Moore Show | Rhoda Morgenstern | 92 episodes Primetime Emmy Award for Outstanding Supporting Actress in a Comedy Series (1971–73); Nominated — Golden Globe Award for Best Supporting Actress – Series, Miniseries or Television Film (1973–74); Nominated — Primetime Emmy Award for Outstanding Supporting Actress in a Comedy Series |
| 1971 | Story Theatre | Unknown | Unknown episodes |
| 1971 | Love, American Style | Barbara Watkins | Episode: "Love and the Housekeeper" |
| 1971 | The Glen Campbell Goodtime Hour | Herself | 1 episode |
| 1972 | Columbo | Eve Babcock | Episode: "The Most Crucial Game" |
| 1972 | The Dick Cavett Show | Herself | 1 episode |
| 1973 | The Carol Burnett Show | Herself | 1 episode |
| 1974–1978 | Rhoda | Rhoda Morgenstern Gerard | 110 episodes Golden Globe Award for Best Actress – Television Series Musical or Comedy; Primetime Emmy Award for Outstanding Lead Actress in a Comedy Series; Nominated — Golden Globe Award for Best Actress – Television Series Musical or Comedy; Nominated — Primetime Emmy Award for Outstanding Lead Actress in a Comedy Series (1976–78) |
| 1975 | John Denver Rocky Mountain Christmas 1975 TV Special | Herself | Television special |
| 1975 | Dean Martin Celebrity Roast | Herself | |
| 1976 | The Muppet Show | Herself | Episode: "Valerie Harper" |
| 1976–1977 | Dinah! | Herself | 4 episodes |
| 1976–1990 | The Tonight Show Starring Johnny Carson | Herself | 8 episodes |
| 1978–1980 | The Mike Douglas Show | Herself | 7 episodes |
| 1982 | Fridays | Herself | 1 episode |
| 1986 | The Love Boat | Laurel Peters | 2 episodes: "Egyptian Cruise Part 1 & Part 2" |
| 1986–1987 | Valerie | Valerie Hogan | 32 episodes |
| 1989–1990 | The Arsenio Hall Show | Herself | 2 episodes |
| 1990 | City | Liz Gianni | 13 episodes |
| 1990 | Late Night with David Letterman | Herself | 1 episode |
| 1991 | Mary Tyler Moore: The 20th Anniversary Show | Herself | Television special |
| 1994 | Missing Persons | Ellen Hartig | 3 episodes |
| 1995 | The Late Late Show with Tom Snyder | Herself | 1 episode |
| 1995 | The Office | Rita Stone | 6 episodes |
| 1996–1999 | Touched by an Angel | Kate Prescott | 2 episodes: "Flesh and Blood" (1996) and "Full Circle" (1999) |
| 1996–2001 | The Rosie O'Donnell Show | Herself | 6 episodes |
| 1996 | Promised Land | Molly Arnold | Episode: "The Magic Gate" |
| 1998 | Generator Gawl | Various | Voice |
| 1998 | Melrose Place | Mia Mancini | 2 episodes |
| 1998 | Sorcerous Stabber Orphen | Townspeople | Voice, episode: "The Sword of Baltanders" |
| 1999 | Sex and the City | Wallis Wysel | Episode: "Shortcomings" |
| 2000 | Beggars and Choosers | Unknown | Episode: "Be Careful What You Wish For" |
| 2000 | As Told by Ginger | Maryellen | Voice, episode: "The Wedding Frame" |
| 2001 | That '70s Show | Paula | Episode: "Eric's Naughty No-no" |
| 2001 | Family Law | Julia | Episode: "Clemency" |
| 2001 | Three Sisters | Merle Keats | 2 episodes |
| 2002 | The Mary Tyler Moore Reunion | Herself | Television special |
| 2003−2004 | Less than Perfect | Judith | 2 episodes |
| 2005 | Committed | Lily Solomon | Episode: "The Mother Episode" |
| 2007–2016 | Entertainment Tonight | Herself | 7 episodes |
| 2008 | The Oprah Winfrey Show | Herself | 1 episode |
| 2009 | 'Til Death | Barbara | Episode: "The Courtship of Eddie's Parents" |
| 2011 | Desperate Housewives | Claire Bremmer | Episode: "Where Do I Belong" |
| 2011–2012 | Drop Dead Diva | Judge Leslie Singer | 2 episodes |
| 2011–2013 | The Talk | Herself | 1 episode |
| 2013–2018 | The Simpsons | Various characters | Voice, 8 episodes |
| 2013 | Hot in Cleveland | Angie | Episode: "Love Is All Around" |
| 2013 | The View | Herself | 2 episodes |
| 2013 | Dancing with the Stars | Herself (Contestant) | 6 episodes |
| 2014–2019 | American Dad! | IHOP Diner / Various | Voice, 2 episodes |
| 2014 | Signed, Sealed, Delivered | Theresa Capodiamonte | Guest star; 2 episodes: "Time to Start Livin' " and "To Whom It May Concern" |
| 2015 | Melissa & Joey | Aunt Bunny | Episode: "Thanks But No Thanks" |
| 2015 | 2 Broke Girls | Nola | Episode: "And The Great Unwashed" |
| 2016 | Childrens Hospital | Mamma Fiorucci | Episode: "Childrens Horsepital" |

=== Web ===
| Year | Title | Role | Notes |
|---|---|---|---|
| 2018 | Liza on Demand | Wanda | Episode: "Valentine's Day" |

=== Theater ===
| Year | Title | Role | Notes |
|---|---|---|---|
| 1957–1958 | Li'l Abner | Dancer | Replacement, was not in opening night cast. |
| 1959–1960 | Take Me Along | Lady Entertainer, Townswoman | |
| 1960–1961 | Wildcat | Dancer | |
| 1961–1962 | Subways Are for Sleeping | Dancer | |
| 1967–1968 | Something Different | Beth Nemerov | Replacement |
| 1970–1971 | Paul Sills' Story Theatre | Various | |
| 1971 | Ovid's Metamorphoses | Ensemble | |
| 1995 | Death Defying Acts | Dorothy/Carol | Replacement. Off-Broadway: Variety Arts Theatre – 1997 "The Dragon and the Pearl," by Marty Martin, bio of Pearl S. Buck, commissioned by Cacciotti. The play workshopped at Milford, NH's American Stage Festival and was developed at Chicago's Organic Theatre. (Playbill, 11/16/1998) Later performed at TheaterWorks in Hartford, Connecticut. |
| 1998–1999 | All Under Heaven | Pearl S. Buck | Off-Broadway's Century Center Theatre. Ran November 3, 1998 – January 11, 1999. Played 16 previews and 65 regular performances. |
| 2001–2002 | The Tale of the Allergist's Wife | Marjorie | Replacement (July 31, 2001 – May 26, 2002) |
| 2008–2010 | Looped | Tallulah Bankhead | 2010 Tony Award nominee: Best Actress in a Play. Looped ran on Broadway (at the Lyceum Theatre), February 19 – April 11, 2010 for 60 performances. |
| 2015 | Nice Work if You Can Get It | Millicent Winter | Ogunquit Playhouse (Maine) (July 22–29—bowed out after collapsing backstage and being hospitalized. Replaced by Brenda Vaccaro for remaining run through August 15, 2015.) |

== Awards and nominations ==
| Year | Award | Category | Work | Result |
|---|---|---|---|---|
| 1971 | Primetime Emmy | Outstanding Supporting Actress in a Comedy Series | The Mary Tyler Moore Show | Won |
| 1972 | Primetime Emmy | Outstanding Supporting Actress in a Comedy Series | The Mary Tyler Moore Show | Won |
| 1972 | Golden Globe | Best Supporting Actress — Television | The Mary Tyler Moore Show | Nominated |
| 1973 | Primetime Emmy | Outstanding Supporting Actress in a Comedy Series | The Mary Tyler Moore Show | Won |
| 1973 | Golden Globe | Best Supporting Actress — Television | The Mary Tyler Moore Show | Nominated |
| 1974 | Primetime Emmy | Outstanding Supporting Actress in a Comedy Series | The Mary Tyler Moore Show | Nominated |
| 1974 | Golden Globe | New Female Star of the Year | Freebie and the Bean | Nominated |
| 1974 | Golden Globe | Best Actress in a TV Comedy Series | Rhoda | Won |
| 1975 | Primetime Emmy | Outstanding Lead Actress in a Comedy Series | Rhoda | Won |
| 1975 | Golden Globe | Best Actress in a TV Comedy Series | Rhoda | Nominated |
| 1976 | Primetime Emmy | Outstanding Lead Actress in a Comedy Series | Rhoda | Nominated |
| 1977 | Primetime Emmy | Outstanding Lead Actress in a Comedy Series | Rhoda | Nominated |
| 1978 | Primetime Emmy | Outstanding Lead Actress in a Comedy Series | Rhoda | Nominated |
| 1979 | Golden Globe | Best Supporting Actress — Motion Picture | Chapter Two | Nominated |
| 2010 | Tony Award | Best Actress in a Play | Looped | Nominated |
