= Mary and Rhoda =

2000 television film directed by Barnet Kellman

- Genre: Comedy; Drama
- Based on: The Mary Tyler Moore Show by James L. Brooks; Allan Burns
- Written by: Katie Ford
- Directed by: Barnet Kellman
- Starring: Mary Tyler Moore; Valerie Harper; Elon Gold; Christine Ebersole; Joie Lenz; Marisa Ryan
- Music by: David Kitay
- Opening theme: "Love Is All Around" by Joan Jett & the Blackhearts
- Country of origin: United States
- Original language: English

Production
- Executive producers: Mary Tyler Moore; Susan B. Landau
- Producer: Cecilia Kate Roque
- Cinematography: Adam Holender
- Editor: Jeff Wishengrad
- Running time: 86 minutes
- Production company: Fox Television Studios

Original release
- Network: ABC
- Release: February 7, 2000

Related
- The Mary Tyler Moore Show; Rhoda

Mary and Rhoda is a 2000 American made-for-television comedy-drama film starring Mary Tyler Moore and Valerie Harper reprising their roles as Mary Richards and Rhoda Morgenstern, respectively, from the 1970–1977 sitcom The Mary Tyler Moore Show. The film premiered on ABC on February 7, 2000.

Although the film is a spin-off of The Mary Tyler Moore Show, James L. Brooks and Allan Burns were not credited for creating the characters; neither they nor any other writers or producers from the original series were involved with this reunion film. It was the only film of any kind to be based on The Mary Tyler Moore Show and the first production to be set in the series' universe in 18 years since the series finale of Lou Grant in 1982.

Mary and Rhoda was written by Katie Ford, executive produced by Mary Tyler Moore and Susan B. Landau, and directed by Barnet Kellman. During the opening title sequence, the original 1970 version of the theme song "Love Is All Around" is played and then switches to the 1996 version recorded by Joan Jett & the Blackhearts.

== Plot ==
Mary Richards-Cronin returns to New York City after spending four months in Europe ("Italy, mostly," she tells a cabdriver) following the death of her Congressman husband, Steven Cronin, in a rock-climbing accident. Rhoda Morgenstern-Rousseau also returns to her native New York to make a fresh start as a photographer after having lived in Paris for several years, where she has recently divorced her second husband, Jean-Pierre Rousseau.

After decades of separation, Mary and Rhoda start to look for each other and eventually reunite outside Mary's apartment building on the Upper West Side of Manhattan ("84th and Central Park West," Mary tells a cabdriver in an opening scene, though 415 Central Park West, at West 101st Street, was used for the building's exterior shots). The old friends visit Manhattan together and share the events of their lives over the intervening years; Mary then invites Rhoda, just returned to New York, to stay with her in her duplex apartment.

Mary reveals that following her departure from WJM-TV in Minneapolis as a news producer, she earned a master's degree in journalism and worked as a studio producer for ABC News in New York, until her daughter, Rose, was 12 and she decided to quit her job (eight years previously) to spend more time at home. Both Mary's and Rhoda's daughters are now in college—Mary's Rose is an English major at NYU and Rhoda's Meredith is a pre-med student and living in residence at Barnard College—and are trying to build lives of their own, independent of their mothers.

Mary and Rhoda must also each revive their careers, as Rhoda is newly divorced and Mary has learned that her late husband of 20 years spent much of their money on his congressional campaign(s). Both women dread their prospects, as Mary is now 60 and Rhoda is around 58 and lacks confidence in her work as a photographer.

Mary finds a job as a segment producer for WNYT in New York, where she works under the station founder, Jonah Seimeier, who is little more than half Mary's age, and comes into conflict with the ethics of a vain anchor/field reporter, Cecile Andrews; Rhoda finds work as a fashion photographer's assistant, where, in addition to "schlepping", she mothers the young models and begins to take on more responsibility in the studio, as well as to exhibit her own photography independently; Rose suddenly quits school to try her hand at stand-up comedy, with a poor initial reception; and Meredith breaks off from her boyfriend.

Ultimately, all four women learn to conquer challenges in work and relationships, to forge their own identities and stand up for themselves.

== Cast ==
- Mary Tyler Moore as Mary Richards-Cronin
- Valerie Harper as Rhoda Morgenstern-Rousseau
- Elon Gold as Jonah Seimeier
- Christine Ebersole as Cecile Andrews
- Bethany Joy Lenz as Rose Cronin
- Marisa Ryan as Meredith Rousseau

== Early development ==
Mary Tyler Moore and Valerie Harper announced in November 1997 that they had signed with ABC to reprise their roles as Mary and Rhoda in a new sitcom slated for the fall of 1998. ABC had ordered 13 episodes for the new show which featured Mary Richards and Rhoda Morgenstern as widows reunited by chance in New York after many years of estrangement, who each have a 20-something daughter named after the other (Mary's daughter is Rose Cronin and Rhoda's daughter is Meredith Rousseau).

According to reports, ABC executives were not pleased with the script for the pilot episode and the proposed sitcom was scrapped altogether. By 1999, it was confirmed that Moore and Harper would reunite instead in the two-hour made-for-TV movie Mary and Rhoda which began filming on October 18, 1999.

== Viewer reaction and reception ==
The film's producers reportedly wanted to make the characters "current", and as a result, little time was spent in the characters discussing their former life in Minneapolis. This disappointed a number of longtime fans, as did the fact that former Mary Tyler Moore Show characters Lou Grant, Ted Baxter, Murray Slaughter, Phyllis Lindstrom, Georgette Baxter and Sue Ann Nivens were never directly referred to, nor were Rhoda's sister, Brenda Morgenstern, or her father, Martin Morgenstern, not to mention Rhoda's first husband Joe Gerard. (Indeed, Rhoda is shown staying at the "Chester Hotel" when she first returns to New York, although she presumably still has family and friends in the city other than her daughter.) The only characters from The Mary Tyler Moore Show and Rhoda to be mentioned was Ida Morgenstern, Rhoda's mother, and Dottie Richards, Mary's mother, though not by their names.

Critical reaction was largely negative. Phil Gallo of Variety wrote "Taking characters from a great sitcom and moving them into this feel-good drama is a tough task, one that the script isn’t up to...Fans of the great sitcom will certainly ask, 'Where’s the humor?'". Terry Keleher of People singled out Rhoda's subplot as "nearly laughless", and summed up Mary and Rhoda with the comment "Bottom Line: Can’t measure up to the memories.". Howard Rosenberg of the Los Angeles Times opined that Mary and Rhoda felt like "a hologram with no center... the tone here is much less witty than wistful, and re-bottling magic is difficult, perhaps even impossible, especially 25 or so years afterward." Rosenberg was especially critical of the movie's "preachy, smugly self-righteous ending.". James Enderst of the Hartford Courant was particularly scathing, writing: "The script is so stale, the plot so uninspired and the two hours so bereft of comedy ... If you loved The Mary Tyler Moore Show, stay away from Mary and Rhoda. It'll only depress you."

Even reviews that expressed some regard for the project tended to heavily qualify their praise. In a lukewarm review, Barbara Vancheri of the Pittsburgh Post-Gazette wrote: "As far as reunion movies go, it's not embarrassing — Mary Tyler Moore and Valerie Harper look fabulous — but it's also not up to the heady standards set by the 1970s series.". David Bianculli of the New York Daily News felt that "At its best, though, it's no better than good ... dramatic moments strain too obviously for sentimentality, and comic ones sometimes work too hard to be noticed, like an overly loud relative at a dinner party."

Anticipating strong viewer interest, ABC scheduled the movie to air during February sweeps and considered it a pilot for a weekly series. The program attracted 17.8 million viewers, beating out its main competition, CBS's Everybody Loves Raymond, but critical reaction was so adverse ABC decided to abandon the project.

== Home media ==
Mary and Rhoda was released on DVD in Region 1 on April 20, 2004 by Studio Works Entertainment.
