= Walt Disney Home Video (VHS) =

Discontinued videoline

Official logo used for Walt Disney Home Video c.1980s

Walt Disney Home Video is a discontinued video line launched to release Disney animated features on home video. This was done by a division of the same name under the parent Walt Disney Telecommunications and Non-Theatrical Company (WDTNT). As an entity, the name Walt Disney Home Video is now known as Walt Disney Studios Home Entertainment. The scope of this list is mostly limited to Disney's North American live action movie releases. Cartoon collections were concurrently released as Walt Disney Cartoon Classics which include the "Limited Gold Editions". The initial price for early Disney cassettes at the time was "prohibitory expensive" for many, this changed in the mid-1980s when VCRs became affordable.

== History ==
Disney started out by establishing its own video distribution operation in 1980 as part of Walt Disney Telecommunications and Non-Theatrical Company (WDTNT) with Jim Jimirro as its first president. WDTNT Co. also handled marketing of other miscellaneous ancillary items such as short 8 mm films for home movies. When Disney started with video cassettes, "Home video" was not considered to be a major market by them at the time. Their first releases on videotape were 13 titles that were licensed for rental to Fotomat on March 4, 1980. Disney was unusual among the major studios in offering a program for authorized rentals. Most of the other studios involved in the videocassette market at the time were trying to find ways to stop dealers from renting out their movie tapes. Magnetic Video (with titles from 20th Century Fox and others) ceased doing business with Fotomat after Fotomat began renting Magnetic Video cassettes without authorization.

The switchover from rental to sales was a "thorny" issue that was solved by giving dealers an option on the type of outlet they desired. For those who just wanted to rent video cassettes, a title was given (for US$52) on a 13-week cycle. The dealer could then set the price as many times as they wanted in those 13 weeks before purchasing a new title from Disney. Video cassette rentals were more "functionally" packaged with a heavier box and less elaborately detailed illustrations. For those who wanted to sell video cassettes, a "fairly straightforward" program involved 4 color packaging and a suggested retail price. In order to separate the two mediums, the cassette either featured "FOR RENTAL ONLY/Not intended for Sale" or "FOR SALE ONLY/Not intended for Rental". The 13 titles that had been licensed for rental to Fotomat subsequently became available for purchase.

Throughout their release history, "Walt Disney Home Video" cassettes were promoted by Disney. An early example is the 1981 release of "A Walt Disney Christmas" where a "Free Mickey Mouse Plush Toy" was offered as an incentive. Disney later offered a promotion for Summer 1982 called "Disney's American Summer", where they sold some of their live action movies for the first time. At the time this promotion was done in an effort to make video cassettes more affordable, and boosted the video software involved. Marketing included a 7 foot tall gazebo which was set up in stores and a free mug as an incentive. Towards the end of 1984, Disney did a “Wrapped And Ready to Give” Christmas promotion which included seven newly released titles on video cassette. Later promotions include Disney's 1986 "Wonderland Campaign" as a further attempt to bring prices down.

When The Disney Channel was launched on April 18, 1983, it gave the company an opportunity to air made for TV films such as Tiger Town and Gone Are the Dayes, both of which were released to home video in 1984. During that same year Disney also started releasing their animated feature films under the Walt Disney Classics line starting with Robin Hood. On March 8, 1985, Disney released "Love Leads the Way" which became their first title that went straight to Home Video. The Walt Disney Home Video division was legally incorporated as Buena Vista Home Video on February 13, 1987. The Walt Disney Home Video brand continued to be used for all Disney branded releases afterwards.

== North American releases ==
=== First VHS sales (1980) ===
No. (Note: These numbers are in order by release date. While multiple numbering systems were used by Disney to label their VHS tapes, their numerical order does not match up with release dates given by contemporary sources.)	Release date	Title	Initial cost (USD) (Note: Adjusted for inflation $59.95 and $44.95 would be $210.00+ and $160.00+ (2023 USD))	Copies sold (Domestic) (Note: These figures are limited (when possible) to original VHS releases.)	Short summary
1.	October 1, 1980	The Black Hole	$59.95		Re-released in December 1983.
2.	October 1, 1980	Davy Crockett, King of the Wild Frontier	$59.95	75,000 (Note: 1986 ITA Gold Certs)	2nd release in March 1983; 3rd release on May 28, 1986.
3.	October 1, 1980	20,000 Leagues Under the Sea	$59.95		2nd release in March 1983; 3rd release in September 1985; 4th release on May 28, 1986.
4.	October 1, 1980	The Apple Dumpling Gang	$59.95	75,000	Re-released in June 1985
5.	October 1, 1980	The Love Bug	$59.95		Re-released on November 6, 1985
6.	October 1, 1980	Pete's Dragon	$59.95		Re-released on October 14, 1986
7.	October 1, 1980	Escape to Witch Mountain	$59.95	75,000	Re-released on September 21, 1985.
8.	October 1, 1980	The North Avenue Irregulars	$59.95	75,000	Re-released August 1985
9.	October 1, 1980	Bedknobs and Broomsticks	$59.95		2nd release on September 21, 1985; 3rd release on May 28, 1986.
10.	October 1, 1980	Hot Lead and Cold Feet	$59.95		Re-released in March 1983
11.	October 1, 1980	On Vacation with Mickey Mouse and Friends	$44.95		Re-released in December 1983
12.	October 1, 1980	Kids is Kids starring Donald Duck	$44.95		Re-released in December 1983
13.	October 1, 1980	The Adventures of Chip 'n' Dale.	$44.95		Re-released in December 1983

=== VHS releases (1980–1984) ===
No.	Release Date (Note: Some of these sourced dates (ex: Billboard) are tied to the magazine date as the earliest reference to "New Releases".)	Title	Initial cost (USD)	Copies sold (Domestic)	Short summary
1	December 30, 1980	Mary Poppins	$74.95		2nd release in November 1982. 3rd release on November 6, 1985. 4th release on October 14, 1986
2	June 1, 1981	A Dream Called Walt Disney World	Unknown		This was offered as a souvenir to those who visited Walt Disney World in the early 1980s. A Dream Called Walt Disney World was re-released in October 1981.
3	August 15, 1981	The Apple Dumpling Gang Rides Again	Unknown		Re-released in August 1985.
4	August 15, 1981	The Many Adventures of Winnie the Pooh	Unknown		
5	August 15, 1981	The Absent-Minded Professor	Unknown		Re-released on May 28, 1986, as part of Disney's "Wonderland Campaign".
6	August 15, 1981	Davy Crockett and the River Pirates	Unknown		2nd release in March 1983; 3rd release in August 1985; 4th release on May 28, 1986, as part of Disney's "Wonderland Campaign".
7	August 15, 1981	Gus	Unknown		2nd release in March 1983; 3rd release in June 1985
8	August 15, 1981	The One and Only, Genuine, Original Family Band	Unknown		2nd release in August 1985
9	August 15, 1981	Snow White Live at Radio City Music Hall	Unknown		
10	October 1981	A Walt Disney Christmas	$49.95		2nd release in November 1982. 3rd release in December 1983. 4th release in October 1984; 5th release on October 14, 1986
11	October 1981	Amy	Unknown		Re-released in August 1985.
12	October 1981	Darby O'Gill and the Little People	Unknown	75,000	
13	October 1981	Old Yeller	Unknown	75,000	2nd release on November 6, 1985. 3rd release on October 14, 1986
14	January 1982	Treasure Island	Unknown	75,000	Re-released on October 14, 1986.
15	January 1982	Condorman	Unknown		
16	January 1982	Goofy Over Sports	$49.95		Re-released on May 21, 1983
17	January 1982	The Shaggy Dog	Unknown		
18	January 1982	The Devil and Max Devlin	Unknown		
19	March 27, 1982	Herbie Rides Again	Unknown	75,000	
20	March 27, 1982	Pollyanna	Unknown	75,000	Re-released on October 14, 1986
21	March 27, 1982	The Sign of Zorro	Unknown		
22	April 1982	A Tale of Two Critters	Unknown		
23	June 12, 1982	Swiss Family Robinson	$69.95	75,000	Re-released November 6, 1985
24	June 12, 1982	Freaky Friday	$69.95		
25	June 12, 1982	A Day at Disneyland	$49.95		This was offered as a souvenir to those who visited Walt Disney World in the early 1980s.
26	June 12, 1982	Justin Morgan Had a Horse	$69.95		
27	September 4, 1982	Blackbeard's Ghost	$69.95		
28	September 4, 1982	Night Crossing	$69.95		
29	September 4, 1982	The Legend of Sleepy Hollow	$69.95		Sleepy Hollow later aired on October 30, 1982, as part of Disney's Halloween Treat.
30	September 4, 1982	The Three Caballeros	$69.95		
31	September 11, 1982	The Watcher in the Woods	$69.95	75,000	The Watcher in the Woods was originally a "Rental only" title starting in April 1982.
32	October 16, 1982	Babes in Toyland	Unknown	75,000	Re-released November 6, 1985
33	October 16, 1982	Disney's Storybook Classics	$49.95		Includes: "Little Toot", "Chicken Little", "Peter and The Wolf", and "The Grasshopper and the Ant"
34	October 16, 1982	Fun and Fancy Free	$49.95		
35	October 16, 1982	Snowball Express	$69.95		
36	October 1982 (Note: Dumbo and Alice in Wonderland were previously released as "rental only" on August 15, 1981.)	Dumbo	$84.95		2nd release in December 1983. Dumbo was also re-released on November 5, 1985, as part of Walt Disney Classics.
37	November 1982	Alice in Wonderland	$84.95		Re-released on May 28, 1986, as part of Walt Disney Classics (Wonderland Campaign).
38	December 1, 1982	Tron	$84.95		Re-released November 6, 1985
39	March 1983	American Heros Featuring Paul Bunyan and Pecos Bill	$49.95		This features Paul Bunyan (the movie) and Pecos Bill from Melody Time.
40	March 1983	The Island at the Top of the World	$59.95		
41	March 1983	The Last Flight of Noah's Ark	Unknown		
42	March 1983	The Shaggy D.A.	$59.95		Re-released on September 21, 1985
43	March 1983	The Wind in the Willows	$49.95		
44	April 18, 1983	Tex	$69.95		
45	May 21, 1983	Johnny Tremain	$69.95		Re-released in December 1984
46	May 21, 1983	The Great Locomotive Chase	$69.95		
47	May 21, 1983	Trenchcoat	$69.95		Re-released in December 1984
48	August 27, 1983	Something Wicked This Way Comes	$69.95		
49	November 14, 1983	The Cat from Outer Space	Unknown		
50	January 14, 1984	The Parent Trap	$69.95	75,000	Re-released on May 28, 1986, as part of Disney's "Wonderland Campaign".
51	January 14, 1984	In Search of the Castaways	$69.95		Re-released in Late 1985
52	April 7, 1984	Big Red	$69.95		Re-released on April 4, 1985.
53	April 7, 1984	Follow Me, Boys!	$69.95		
54	April 7, 1984	The Boatniks	$69.95		
55	April 7, 1984	The Happiest Millionaire	$69.95		Re-released on May 28, 1986, as part of Disney's "Wonderland Campaign".
56	April 7, 1984	Tiger Town	$69.95		This movie premiered on The Disney Channel, and was re-released on September 26, 1985
57	July 14, 1984	Son of Flubber	$69.95		
58	July 14, 1984	The Castaway Cowboy	$69.95		
59	September 15, 1984	The Incredible Journey	$69.95		
60	November 1984	Herbie Goes Bananas	$69.95	75,000	Re-released on November 6, 1985
61	November 1984	Herbie Goes to Monte Carlo	$69.95	75,000	Re-released on November 6, 1985
62	November 1984	Where the Toys Come From	$49.95		
63	December 1984	Gone Are the Dayes	$69.95		This movie premiered on The Disney Channel.

=== VHS releases (1985–1987) ===
No.	Release Date (Note: Some of these sourced dates (ex: Billboard) are tied to the magazine date as the earliest reference to "New Releases".)	Title	Initial cost (USD)	Short summary
64	February 26, 1985	The Gnome-Mobile	$69.95	
65	March 8, 1985	Love Leads the Way	$69.95	This movie premiered on The Disney Channel, and was the first directly released to Home Video.
66	March 24, 1985	Summer Magic	$69.95	
67	March 24, 1985	That Darn Cat!	$69.95	
68	April 2, 1985	Black Arrow	Unknown	This movie premiered on The Disney Channel.
69	April 4, 1985	The Prince and the Pauper	$69.95	This movie was released in 1962 and is directed by Don Chaffey.
70	June 1985	Never A Dull Moment	$69.95	
71	July 27, 1985	The Sword and the Rose	$69.95	
72	September 1985	Superdad	$69.95	
73	September 21, 1985	The Moon-Spinners	$69.95	
74	October 19, 1985	Rob Roy: The Highland Rogue	$69.95	
75	October 19, 1985	The Barefoot Executive	$69.95	
76	October 19, 1985	The Computer Wore Tennis Shoes	$69.95	
77	October 19, 1985	The Three Lives of Thomasina	$69.95	
78	October 19, 1985	Those Calloways	$69.95	
79	October 29, 1985	The Bears and I	Unknown	
80	January 1986	The Blue Yonder	Unknown	This movie premiered on The Disney Channel.
81	February 23, 1986	The Legend of Lobo	$69.95	
82	March 1986	Escapade in Florence	Unknown	Released as part of "Annette Month" honoring Annette Funicello.
83	March 1986	Lots of Luck	Unknown	Released as part of "Annette Month" honoring Annette Funicello.
84	March 1986	The Horsemasters	Unknown	Released as part of "Annette Month" honoring Annette Funicello.
85	March 1986	The Misadventures of Merlin Jones	Unknown	Released as part of "Annette Month" honoring Annette Funicello.
86	March 1986	The Monkey's Uncle	Unknown	Released as part of "Annette Month" honoring Annette Funicello.
87	May 25, 1986	Toby Tyler or 10 Weeks with a Circus	Unknown	
88	June 22, 1986	Charley and the Angel	$69.95	
89	July 10, 1986	The Million Dollar Duck	$69.95	
90	July 26, 1986	Lt. Robin Crusoe, U.S.N.	$69.95	
91	July 26, 1986	Moon Pilot	$69.95	
92	July 26, 1986	One of Our Dinosaurs Is Missing	$69.95	
93	July 26, 1986	Unidentified Flying Oddball	$69.95	
94	August 19, 1986	King of the Grizzlies	$69.95	
95	August 19, 1986	Mooncussers	$69.95	
96	August 19, 1986	Savage Sam	$69.95	
97	August 19, 1986	The Light in the Forest	$69.95	
98	August 19, 1986	The Wild Country	$69.95	
99	October 1986	Down and Out in Beverly Hills	$69.95	Also released under Touchstone Pictures.
100	October 1986	No Deposit, No Return	$69.95	Also released under Touchstone Pictures.
101	October 1986	Ten Who Dared	$69.95	
102	October 1986	The Fighting Prince of Donegal	$69.95	
103	October 1986	The World's Greatest Athlete	$69.95	
104	October 1986	Third Man on the Mountain	$69.95	
105	November 26, 1986	Dr. Syn, Alias the Scarecrow	$69.95	
106	November 26, 1986	Menace on the Mountain	$69.95	
107	November 26, 1986	The Adventures of Bullwhip Griffin	$69.95	
108	December 20, 1986	A Tiger Walks	$69.95	
109	December 20, 1986	Nikki: Wild Dog of the North	$69.95	
110	December 20, 1986	Sammy, the Way-Out Seal	$69.95	Originally released in 1962 as a 2-episode TV series.
111	December 20, 1986	The Horse in the Gray Flannel Suit	$69.95	
112	January 31, 1987	Child of Glass	$69.95	
113	January 31, 1987	Johnny Shiloh	$69.95	
114	January 31, 1987	Mosby's Marauders	$69.95	
115	April 12, 1987	Ride a Wild Pony	$69.95	Released under "Walt Disney Home Video".
116	May 1987	Bon Voyage!	$69.95	
117	May 1987	Miracle of the White Stallions	$69.95	
118	May 1987	Smith!	$69.95	
119	May, 1987	The Littlest Outlaw	$69.95	
120	June 23, 1987	Emil and the Detectives	Unknown	

== Worldwide releases ==
Disney first offered Dumbo, Mary Poppins, Mi Amigo El Dragon (Pete's Dragon), Su Mas Fiel Amigo (Old Yeller), La Montana Embrujada (Escape to Witch Mountain), Los Tres Caballeros (The Three Caballeros), Mickey's Christmas Carol, and two cartoon collections in Spanish on November 30, 1985 In the United Kingdom, titles such as Mary Poppins, Pete's Dragon and Bedknobs and Broomsticks were not released on VHS until November 26, 1988. Additional VHS releases in other countries under the "Walt Disney Home Video" are possible, but need further sourcing.

== Rarity ==
In terms of consignment, Heritage Auctions has placed in their "Vintage VHS Tapes Value Guide" that the most desirable VHS tapes released between 1979 and 1990 are still in their original factory shrink wrap. When VCRs were first released in 1977, they were priced between $1,000 to $1,400 which would roughly equal $4,900 to $6,900 in 2023 USD. As this amount was initially unattainable for most homes fewer people were buying VHS tapes, which in turn meant fewer copies being produced. A "likely sum of money for a video cassette at the time was between $80 and $100 or $400+ in 2023 USD. These higher costs lasted until 1985 when VCRs finally began dropping in price. While this meant more tapes were produced, it did not mean that they became any less of a rarity.

In regards to Disney, "Only the earliest of Disney VHS cassettes produced prior to 1985 hold any value to most collectors." Titles such as "Tron" which remains "elusive" for early copies have sold for high amounts in mint condition. Heritage also added that things to look for in general include a sealed tape, a studio logo on the shrink-wrap, and if the latest year listed on the back of the cover is prior to 1986.

== See also ==
- List of Walt Disney Studios films (1980–1989)
- Walt Disney Treasures
- Walt Disney's Classic Cartoon Favorites
- Walt Disney's Timeless Tales
- Walt Disney's It's a Small World of Fun!
