= 14 Going on 30 =

1988 television film by Paul Schneider

- VHS release cover
- Genre: Comedy; Family; Romance
- Written by: Jim Cruickshank; James Orr; Richard Jefferies
- Directed by: Paul Schneider
- Starring: Steven Eckholdt; Daphne Ashbrook; Gabriel Olds; Patrick Duffy
- Music by: Lee Holdridge
- Country of origin: United States
- Original language: English

Production
- Executive producers: Jim Cruickshank; James Orr
- Producer: Susan B. Landau
- Cinematography: Fred J. Koenekamp
- Editor: Richard A. Harris
- Running time: 94 minutes
- Production company: Walt Disney Television

Original release
- Network: ABC
- Release: March 6, 1988

14 Going on 30 is a 1988 American made-for-television comedy film that was broadcast by American Broadcasting Company and Buena Vista Television and later distributed by Walt Disney Home Video. Directed by Paul Schneider, it stars Steven Eckholdt as Danny, a 14-year-old boy who is infatuated with his teacher Miss Peggy Noble (Daphne Ashbrook). Danny uses a "growth accelerator" to make himself appear older than his actual age in an attempt to seduce her. A similar age swap and a nearly identical title appear in the 2004 film 13 Going on 30, and the earlier film may have influenced the later one.

== Plot ==
14-year-old Danny O'Neil is madly in love with his teacher, Miss Peggy Noble. Given the fact that she is engaged to the cold-tempered and vicious gym teacher, Roy Kelton, who is nicknamed Jackjaw for his constant threat of breaking his pupils' jaws, Danny goes through his school days somewhat uninspired and suffers in silence.

One day, he oversees his geeky friend Lloyd Duffy, an orphan who happens to live next door with his uncaring uncle Herb and ditsy aunt May, growing fruits with an experimental growth accelerator. Danny becomes obsessed with the idea of turning himself into a grown man with the same machine, in order to break up Miss Noble's engagement, as well as convincing her to give him a chance. Lloyd is reluctant to help him out, aware of everything that could go wrong, so Danny secretly breaks into his lab and uses his machine that very night, seeing that the timing was perfect, considering that his parents will be leaving the house for a week. Not caring about the potential consequences, he turns himself into a 30-year-old man.

The next day, Lloyd immediately starts working on a machine with the opposite effect so he can return Danny to his 14-year-old self. Meanwhile, Danny visits the high school to pursue Miss Noble. When he arrives, he is promptly mistaken for the school's new principal, Harold Forndexter, who should have arrived to take up his position that morning (the real Forndexter has been delayed, but due to a miscommunication the school was not informed). Playing along with their misconception, Danny not only impresses his assistant Louisa Horton with the introduction of his new rules - which include having as much fun as possible - but also Peggy, who admires his youthful approach of life.

Lloyd, however, is having no luck with his attempts to turn Danny back to his younger age, as all of his prototype machines killed the tomatoes he used as test subjects. Lloyd is also becoming slightly jealous of Danny, who now seems to have total freedom, unlike Lloyd, who's stuck with an adoptive family that never wanted him, and he begins to openly wonder what it would be like to become a man too. Unconcerned with all this, Danny continues to pursue a relationship with Peggy. Much to the dismay of Kelton, she agrees to go on a date with Danny, Even though Kelton follows their every step. Peggy has a splendid evening with the new principal, and they almost kiss at the end of the night.

During a school dance, Danny finally convinces Peggy that Kelton is not right for her, and she breaks off the engagement. By this time, Lloyd has finally completed a working machine. But when he goes to inform Danny, he discovers that the 'Harold' persona has completely taken Danny over and he refuses to change back, telling Lloyd that he likes his new body and life, and that he's never becoming Danny again. Immediately afterwards, Danny and Peggy become a couple. Kelton, refusing to accept this, tries to find out more on Forndexter, and discovers that 'Harold' is an impostor. He immediately informs the police, who arrive quickly to arrest him, giving Danny no choice but to transform back into a kid.

While Danny tries to escape, Lloyd prepares the machine for him. After getting rid of the cops, 'Harold' tells Peggy that he has to leave town for good, and then, after returning to Lloyd's lab, becomes Danny again. However, Peggy followed him and witnesses his transformation, now realising that 'Harold' was actually Danny, one of her favourite students. Because she has fallen in love with him, she convinces Lloyd to use the same machine to turn herself into a 14-year-old, which enables her to be with Danny. Meanwhile, in order to escape his abusive family, Lloyd finally gives in to temptation and uses the machine to turn himself into a professor, called Mr. Lloyd, and starts working at the same high school as a teacher.

== Cast ==
- Gabey Olds as Danny O'Neil at 14
- Steve Eckholdt as Danny O'Neil at 30 ("Happy" Harold Forndexter)
- Adam Carl as Lloyd Duffy at 14
- Sal Viscuso as Lloyd Duffy "Mr. Lloyd" at 30
- Irene Tedrow as May
- Patrick Duffy as an actor in a classic film
- Harry Morgan as Herb
- Loretta Swit as Miss Louisa Horton
- Alan Thicke as the real Harold Forndexter
- Dick Van Patten as Mr. Loomis
- Rick Rossovich as Roy "Jackjaw" Kelton
- Amy Hathaway as Peggy Noble at 14
- Daphne Ashbrook as Miss Peggy Noble at 30
