= Susan B. Landau =

American film producer

- Born: March 31, 1952; Brooklyn, New York
- Died: May 31, 2017 (aged 65); Los Angeles, California
- Occupation(s): Film producer, photographer

Susan B. Landau (March 31, 1952 – May 31, 2017) was an American film producer, television producer, talent manager, and photographer whose credits included Mr. Destiny in 1990, Cool Runnings in 1993, An Ideal Husband in 1999, and the 2000 television film, Mary and Rhoda.

== Biography ==
Landau and her twin brother, Paul, were born in Brooklyn, New York, to Sidney Landau, a studio executive at United Artists, and Bea Landau. She attended Springfield Gardens High School in Queens, New York, and received a bachelor's degree political science from Brandeis University in 1974.

She executive produced 1983's Tiger Town, the first television film produced by the Disney Channel, which won a 1984 CableACE Award for Best Dramatic Film, as well as the Walt Disney's Wonderful World of Color: Young Harry Houdini in 1987, which earned her a Primetime Emmy Award nomination for Outstanding Children's Program.

Landau was best known for producing the 1993 comedic film, Cool Runnings, which was loosely based on the Jamaica national bobsleigh team's 1988 Winter Olympics debut. Her other film production credits included Mr. Destiny in 1990, the 1999 documentary Get Bruce, An Ideal Husband in 1999, and All Over the Guy in 2001. She teamed with actress Mary Tyler Moore to co-executive produce the 2000 television film, Mary and Rhoda, based on the 1970s sitcom, The Mary Tyler Moore Show.

In the 1992 California race for U.S. Senate, Landau fundraised on behalf of Senate candidate Barbara Boxer, a Democrat. Boxer, who won the 1992 Senate election, credited Landau with boosting her campaign and her political career, telling an interviewer in 2017, "Susan Landau was a one-of-a-kind and I honestly believe that without her energetic support, I never would have been elected to the Senate in 1992."

Additionally, Landau also worked as a talent manager representing others within the entertainment industry, including screenwriter Simon Beaufoy (writer of Slumdog Millionaire, Salmon Fishing in the Yemen, and The Hunger Games: Catching Fire); actor Dan Bucatinsky (Scandal); director Stephen Surjik (Wayne's World 2), whom she represented for 21 years; and producer Christopher Hollier (The Originals). According to Beaufoy, he and Landau spoke almost daily for 25 years. Hollier praised her abilities as a manager, "there's never been someone more talented at bringing talent out in others. Director, producer, writer – no one could have a better friend in this town."

Landau transitioned to photography beginning in 2007. Her subjects included the Stand Up to Cancer telethon, which had been co-founded by her friend, the late film producer Laura Ziskin. The two had been friends since their work on the set of the 1978 film, Eyes of Laura Mars and Landau later published "Laura Ziskin: Collective Memories & Photographs." Her other subjects included the cast and crew of Showtime's Web Therapy, as well as the producers of five Academy Awards shows. In 2017, Landau published another photo collection, "The Brown Bears of Alaska."

Landau died following a brief illness at Cedars-Sinai Medical Center in Los Angeles on May 31, 2017, at the age of 65. She was survived by her older brothers, Arthur and Avraham, her twin brother, Paul, and four nieces.

== Filmography ==
She was a producer in all films unless otherwise noted.

=== Film ===
Year	Film	Credit	Notes
1983	The American Snitch		
1990	Mr. Destiny	Co-producer	
1993	Cool Runnings	Executive producer	
1995	Angus	Executive producer	
1999	An Ideal Husband	Executive producer	
2001	All Over the Guy	Executive producer	
2002	Crazy Little Thing		
2007	Marigold	Executive producer	
2009	Road, Movie		Final film as a producer

Miscellaneous crew

Year	Film	Role
1975	The Happy Hooker	Production assistant
1975	Breakheart Pass	Production assistant
1976	Burnt Offerings	Production assistant
1978	Eyes of Laura Mars	Special project assistant
1979	Last Embrace	Assistant to producers

As an actress

Year	Film	Role
1977	Andy Warhol's Bad	Girl in Theater

Thanks

Year	Film	Role
2008	For a Moment, Freedom	Thanks

=== Television ===
Year	Title	Credit	Notes
1983	Tiger Town		Television film
1985	The Blue Yonder		Television film
1986	The Leftovers	Executive producer	Television film
1987	Young Harry Houdini	Executive producer	Television film
1988	14 Going on 30		Television film
1993	Spies	Executive producer	Television film
2000	Mary and Rhoda	Executive producer	Television film
2001	Princess of Thieves	Executive producer	Television film
2003	Great Performances	Executive producer	

Miscellaneous crew

Year	Title	Role
2003	Great Performances	Creative consultant

Camera and electrical department

Year	Title	Role
2012	The Unwritten Rules	Still photographer
