= Springfield Gardens High School =

Public school in New York City (1965–2007)

Springfield Gardens High School (Educational Campus)
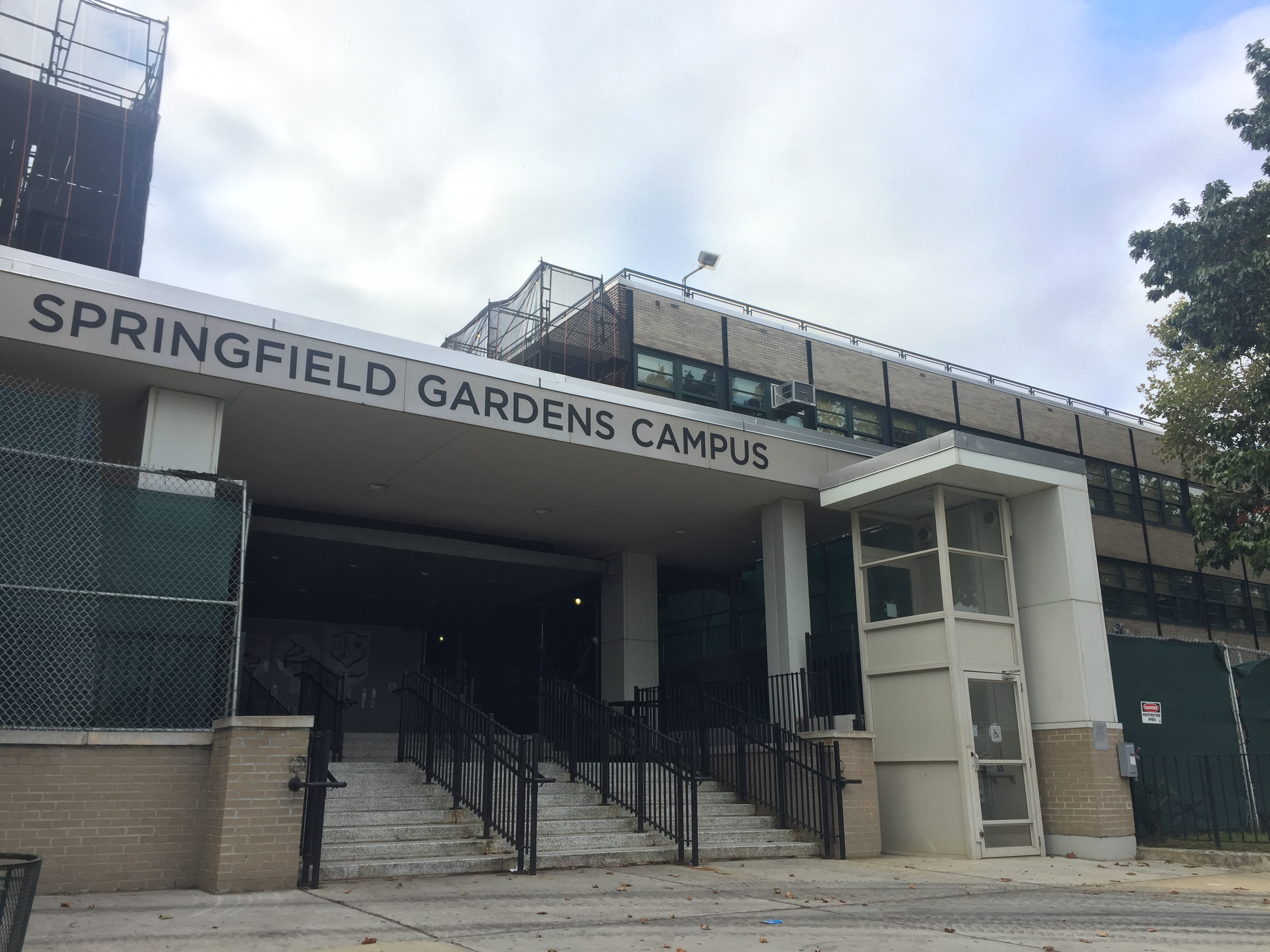

Location
- 143–10 Springfield Boulevard; Springfield Gardens, New York, 11413; United States; 40°40′5″N 73°45′28″W

Information
- Type: Public Secondary
- Established: 1965; 2007 (Educational Campus)
- School district: New York City Public Schools (District 29)
- Principal: Lilly Lucas (Excelsior Preparatory High School); Tashon Haywood (Queens Preparatory Academy); Charles Anderson (Preparatory Academy for Writers); Janice Sutton (George W. Carver High School)
- Faculty: 100+
- Grades: 6–12
- Enrollment: 1,988 (2017–2018)
- Colors: Green; Gold
- Mascot: Eagles
- Nickname: Garden
- Yearbook: Harbinger
- Website: Q272 - George W. Carver; Q283 - Preparatory Academy; Q265 - Excelsior Preparatory; Q248 - Queens Prep Academy

Springfield Gardens High School was a public 4-year high school located in the Springfield Gardens section in the New York City borough of Queens. The school was opened in 1965. Closed in 2007, The Springfield Gardens High School building later became a complex made up of four other schools named Springfield Gardens Educational Campus. The schools are named Preparatory Academy for Writers, Queens Preparatory Academy, Excelsior Preparatory High School, and George Washington Carver High School for the Sciences.

== History ==
Opening in 1965, Springfield Gardens High School was plagued by poor test scores and a high drop-out rate by the late–1970s. After years of poor performance, the school graduated its last class in June 2007.

== Schools/Facilities ==
- Excelsior Preparatory High School and George Washington Carver High School for the Sciences are preparatory schools with an emphasis on science. To help the students prepare for college, students may participate in a Gateway Institute for Pre-College Education science program that will allow students to have internships or work with Queens College professors. Students wishing to pursue technical or vocational training may participate in Excelsior Prep's program with the School of Cooperative Technical Education. A veterinary program is offered at George Washington Carver.
- Queens Preparatory Academy and the Preparatory Academy for Writers has humanities, journalism, and performing arts programs.
- Success Academy Charter Schools was co-located on the campus during the 2014/2015 school year. The schools participate in a program to improve college education for Latino and black boys called the Expanded Success Initiative.
- Preparatory Academy for Writers carries sixth and seventh graders and is the only school of the four currently taking junior high students. Shared facilities across the schools include a cafeteria, gymnasium, media center and outdoor fields for sports programs.

== Current principals ==
- Excelsior Preparatory High School – Lilly Lucas
- Queens Preparatory Academy – Tashon Haywood
- Preparatory Academy for Writers – Charles Anderson
- George Washington Carver High School – Janice Sutton

== Notable alumni ==
This is a partial list of notable alumni of Springfield Gardens High School. Names on this list should either have an accompanying existing article link which verifies they are an alumnus, or reliable sources as footnotes against the name showing they are a notable alumnus.

- Lawrence Bush, 1968 – author, editor (Jewish Currents).
- Alan Jacobson, 1978 - author
- Calvin Bruton, 1972 – basketball player, NBA and Australian League.
- Pepa (Sandra Denton) – hip-hop artist, rapper and actress (Salt-N-Pepa).
- Charles Jenkins, 2006 – basketball player, NBA (Philadelphia 76ers); won multiple Haggerty Awards at Hofstra University.
- Susan B. Landau, 1970 – film and television producer (Cool Runnings, Mary and Rhoda)
- Anthony Mason, 1984 – basketball player, NBA (1989–2003), and 2001 All–Star.
- Mike Mazzei, 1975 – Wall Street executive
- Phife Dawg, 1988 – rapper and member of A Tribe Called Quest
- Norm Roberts, 1983 – basketball coach (Queens' College, St. John's).
- Khandi Alexander, 1977 – actress
- Mikey D, 1986 – rapper (Mikey D & the L.A. Posse, Main Source).
- Cliff Clinkscales, 2004-transferred - basketball player
