= Gabriel Olds =

American actor and writer (born 1972)

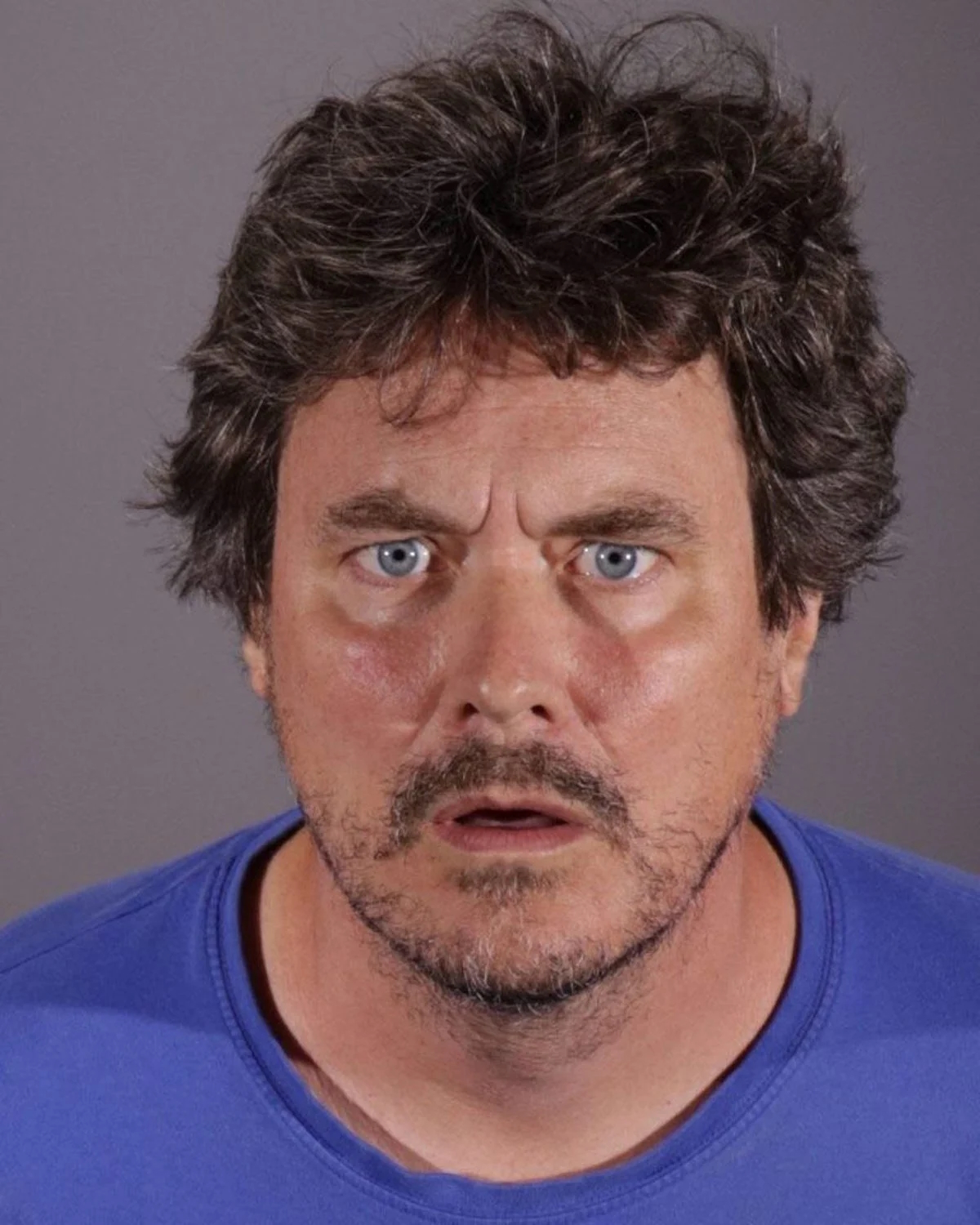
- 2024 mug shot of Gabriel Olds by the Los Angeles Police Department
- Born: Gabriel Emerson Olds; March 24, 1972 (age 54); New York City, United States
- Occupation: Actor
- Years active: 1988–present
- Mother: Sharon Olds

Gabriel Emerson Olds (born March 24, 1972) is an American actor and writer. He is best known for his portrayal of American minister Pat Robertson in The Eyes of Tammy Faye (2021).

== Early life ==
Olds was born in New York City, New York on March 24, 1972. He is the son of poet Sharon Olds (née Cobb), winner of the 2013 Pulitzer Prize for Poetry. Olds began acting at age 15 at The Public Theater in New York, in a performance of Measure for Measure in 1987.

== Career ==
=== Acting career ===
Olds was cast in14 Going on 30 (ABC, 1988), a two-part Disney Sunday Movie with an age-shifting plot, similar to Big. In 1992, Olds was hired by Dick Wolf for an episode of Law & Order called "Pride and Joy", in which Olds played a high school student who murders his own father.

In 1993, Olds made his Broadway debut with the drama Any Given Day, a prequel to the Pulitzer Prize-winning The Subject Was Roses. Olds took time off from Yale University to perform in the show. Soon after, Olds was cast in the Penny Marshall-produced film Calendar Girl. Back at Yale, Olds starred in and directed the Shakespearean drama Richard II, to positive notices. More work followed, with a supporting role in John Frankenheimer's Civil War prison camp miniseries Andersonville (TNT), and work on Party of Five (Fox), Sisters (NBC), and a well-reviewed appearance in Charmed.

Olds then went back to Broadway, co-starring in Arthur Miller's A View from the Bridge at the Roundabout Theater, which won the Tony Award for Best Revival of a Play. Olds was well received as Rodolpho, an illegal immigrant who stays with Eddie Carbone (Anthony LaPaglia) and falls in love with Catherine (Brittany Murphy).

Olds also took a supporting role opposite Billy Crudup in the Steve Prefontaine biopic Without Limits. In 2000, Law & Order producer Dick Wolf, who had worked with Olds before, offered him the lead role in The WB's political drama, D.C. The actor was hired to play Mason Scott, a privileged idealist with a pragmatic roommate (Mark-Paul Gosselaar) and a flaky twin sister (Jacinda Barrett).

Olds then went on to playing a deluded actor in the independent drama Urbania (2000). Other credits include E-Ring, Commander in Chief, Six Feet Under, CSI: Crime Scene Investigation, Law & Order: Special Victims Unit, Cold Case, Numb3rs, Medium, Franklin & Bash and Private Practice. Olds also played the role of "Ed" in the Tommy Lee Jones film The Three Burials of Melquiades Estrada (2005), although his scenes were deleted.

In 2007, Olds filmed two television pilots, Conspiracy (Lifetime), and Winters (NBC). The latter was executive produced by David Shore, creator of House. In the same year, Olds starred in the LA stage production of the two-person play Tryst, at the Black Dahlia Theater, which won got him rave reviews, six nominations, and two wins for Best Actor, from LA Weekly Theater Awards and the LADCC.

Olds did voiceover work for Capcom's video game Dead Rising, playing psychopath Paul Carson. He also played other characters in Uncharted 4: A Thief's End, and Dishonored: Death of the Outsider.

Olds was in NBC's The Event, and NBC's Heroes where he plays a shape-shifted version of Sylar. Olds also appeared in the CBS dramas Criminal Minds and The Mentalist, and in the Bruce Willis action film Surrogates, in which he plays a cyborg cop. Olds had a recurring part on HBO's Boardwalk Empire, and has appeared on all of CBS's NCIS franchise shows, including, NCIS, NCIS: New Orleans, and NCIS: Los Angeles. Olds played Crowley in SEAL Team, and William in Amazing Stories (2020).

Olds' indie film, Apartment 407 won best picture at the San Diego International Film Festival in 2017. In 2021, he portrayed a young Pat Robertson in The Eyes of Tammy Faye.

=== Writing career ===
Olds writes screenplays and freelance journalism for Condé Nast Publications and Salon.com. He has written about flying after 9/11 and plastic surgery in Los Angeles.

== Sexual assault allegations ==
On August 7, 2024, Olds was arrested at 9:40 a.m. by the Los Angeles Police Department and charged with seven counts of felony sexual assault involving at least three victims over the course of 10 years. His bail has been set at $3.5 million. On September 9, 2024, he was charged with five additional counts of sexual assault.
