= Alan Jacobson =

American writer

- Born: Rosedale, Queens, New York City, U.S
- Occupation: Novelist
- Writing career
- Period: 1997–present
- Genres: Thriller, Mystery, Suspense
- Website: www.alanjacobson.com

Alan Jacobson is an American author of mystery, suspense, thriller and action novels. Among his works are the FBI profiler Karen Vail series and the OPSIG Team Black series, as well as stand alone books and short stories.

His film reviews, photographs, short stories, and nonfiction articles have appeared in Variety, The Strand Magazine, Suspense Magazine, the New York Post, American Express travel insert, PBS, New York Gossip Girl, Sacramento Valley Chiropractic Association bulletin, and The Eighteen Eleven (Federal Law Enforcement Officers Association journal).

== Early life ==
Jacobson was born and raised in Rosedale, New York in Queens (the same town featured in his novel, Spectrum). He attended elementary school at PS 138, then Junior High School 231, and Springfield Gardens High School, where he was ranked ninth in his graduating class.

Jacobson has spoken openly of his volatile Junior High School experiences during the federal government's failed forced busing experiment in which students were bused from predominantly white neighborhoods into schools in black neighborhoods, and vice versa, in an attempt to force integration in the community. The student body was threatened on a daily basis. Coming from his elementary school, where two of his best friends were black, it was a rude awakening to the realities of ethnic tension that existed in Rosedale, Laurelton, Jamaica, and Springfield Gardens. Despite this, Jacobson chose not to take the attacks personally, and was able to overcome the volatile environment. He recalls attending a group counseling session in his freshman year of high school to address the racial problems that occurred at 231. When it was his turn to speak, he told of being threatened, beaten up, robbed, stuck with needles in the hallways, and held hostage in the school basement's bookroom. But he felt it was done by specific individuals and it was not fair to judge an entire group of people because of the actions of some.

Jacobson held a number of jobs as a teenager and young adult, including working part-time in his father's small business in New York City, tutoring English Second Language students at Queens College and Queensborough Community College, and busing tables and making deliveries for Woodro Deli in Cedarhurst, New York; the latter was to make enough money for his move to California in 1982 to attend chiropractic school. (The deli also appeared in Jacobson's novel, Spectrum.)

Jacobson earned a bachelor's degree in English from Queens College (1982) and a Doctor of Chiropractic from Palmer College of Chiropractic West (1985).

== Early influences and career ==
During his junior high school years, Jacobson took English from teacher Louis Brill for two years. Jacobson attributes his love for English, and ultimately his pursuit of an English degree, to Brill. No Way Out, the fifth novel in the Karen Vail series, is dedicated to Brill. Jacobson and Brill reunited for the first time in nearly forty years at Thrillerfest in New York City in 2015.

Jacobson obtained his Bachelor of Arts degree in English from Queens College of the City University of New York. There were two transformative learning experiences, one positive and one negative. Again, they involved teachers. On the positive side, Jacobson took two classes from Professor Richard Schotter, himself an accomplished playwright, where Jacobson learned the nuances and importance of writing effective dialogue, something that proved invaluable years later as a novelist. Jacobson has said that writing dialogue is deceivingly difficult because it takes skill to carve away the fat of real exchanges between people and yet make them seem perfectly natural.

On the negative side, his Short Story Workshop professor lambasted Jacobson for a story he had written involving two young soldiers from opposing sides of a conflict who became trapped in a cave. One of them had suffered an abdominal injury. The professor criticized Jacobson for writing about a character with an abdominal wound if he had not experienced one himself and thus did not know how painful they were.

Twenty years later, in the early stages of his writing career, Jacobson realized the professor had a point. If you were going to write about something like war and abdominal wounds, you needed to know what you were talking about. While writing his first published novel, False Accusations, his path crossed that of the head of the California Department of Justice. During a phone call with Jacobson, he requested a reference on one of Jacobson's employees who was applying to be a forensic scientist. Jacobson then asked the director a question about a novel he was writing (False Accusations) involving the character of Ryan Chandler.

Jacobson's early draft of False Accusations referred to Chandler as a criminologist, but the director corrected him. Chandler was a criminalist. Many years before the CSI TV show, no one knew what a criminalist was unless you worked in forensics. But once the difference was explained to him, Jacobson realized he had homework to do to avoid making similar errors. That episode influenced his approach to his fiction. If an FBI agent reached for a Glock, it had better be the right caliber and model because Jacobson does have law enforcement officers who read his novels and they live the reality.

He began his career as a Doctor of Chiropractic. He was then appointed to the position of Qualified Medical Evaluator by the State of California, and served as an expert witness within the justice system. Due to an injury Jacobson was forced to leave the medical field.

Jacobson is known for his depth of research with the FBI's Behavioral Analysis Unit (BAU), especially in his work with retired FBI agent Mark Safarik, with whom he co-authored an e-book titled "Staying Safe."

== Post-graduate work ==
Although he loved writing, he never intended to do it professionally. After getting his Bachelor of Arts in English from Queens College in New York, Jacobson moved to California to get his doctor of chiropractic degree from Palmer College of Chiropractic-West in California. He practiced for nearly nine years but his career was cut short when an injury to his wrists forced him to take an administrative role. He ultimately sold his practice and returned to writing, scoring his first bestseller, False Accusations, five years later.

== Work with the FBI's Behavioral Analysis Unit ==
While auditing a course on blood spatter pattern analysis at the California Department of Justice's Criminalistics Institute, Jacobson met FBI special agent Mark Safarik. Safarik was awaiting a promotion to the behavioral analysis unit at the time. Jacobson and Safarik struck up a conversation and became friends. Safarik was himself fascinated by serial killers and profiling concepts and Jacobson was excited to learn as much as he could. In the subsequent months, after Safarik was promoted to Quantico, he invited Jacobson out to visit and tour the FBI Academy and profiling unit.

It was the first of many visits Jacobson would make to the FBI Academy and profiling unit spanning over a decade. Shortly after creating the character of Karen Vail and writing the first 75 pages of The 7th Victim, Jacobson met Safarik's partner, Supervisory Special Agent Mary Ellen O'Toole, who gave him an understanding of what it was like being a female profiler in a male-dominated unit. Jacobson used this information and experience to fill out Vail's background and tenacity. He continues to work with both Safarik and O'Toole for his Karen Vail series. Spectrum is dedicated to O'Toole and Inmate 1577 to Safarik.

== Professional influences ==
Jacobson has mentioned authors Steve Martini, David Morrell, Andy McNab, Nelson DeMille, Allan Folsom, Michael Connelly, Michael Crichton, Robert Ludlum, Dennis Lehane, and O. Henry as influences. He has stated that he doesn't like to name specific authors as he will forget to mention some.

Jacobson's relates a story regarding Steve Martini. While an aspiring writer, Jacobson was addicted to Steve Martini novels. When Martini did a book signing at Barnes & Noble, Jacobson attended. While Martini was signing the hardcover to him, Jacobson asked him for advice on getting published. About ten years later, while at the ThrillerFest writers conference in New York City, Jacobson felt a tap on his shoulder. He turned to see his publisher, Roger Cooper of Vanguard Press, standing with Martini. Cooper introduced the two men and Jacobson mentioned that they had met many years earlier at a signing. Weeks later, he asked if Martini would read his new manuscript, Crush. Martini loved the book and wrote a testimonial blurb for it, which appeared on the Crush hardcover jacket. The following year at ThrillerFest, Jacobson was standing at the elevators when he again felt a tap on his shoulder. He turned to see Steve Martini standing there with a copy of Crush. He asked Jacobson to autograph it for him. He felt like he had come full circle as a writer.

Nelson DeMille was also an early influence. Even though Jacobson had created Karen Vail a couple of years before DeMille's John Corey character debuted in Plum Island, Vail was very similar in demeanor to Corey. DeMille agreed. Of Vail's first novel, The 7th Victim (2008), DeMille wrote, "Alan Jacobson is a hell of a writer, and his lead character, Karen Vail, is a hell of a lady: tough, smart, funny, and very believable…This reads like a Nelson DeMille book. And I should know".

== First publishing contract ==
In 1998, Simon & Schuster's Pocket Books imprint inked Jacobson to a solid six-figure deal for two thrillers, False Accusations and The Hunted. The former was originally published by a small Canadian publisher, Commonwealth, that went into bankruptcy just as it was preparing to ship books to stores. Jacobson was able to get them to distribute a fraction of the first printing and it caught on and sold well. But retailers were unable to order additional copies and Jacobson had to sue Commonwealth by hiring a Canadian law firm. He ultimately won the case and the rights reverted to him, thanks to a clause inserted by his entertainment law attorney, Robert Youdelman, Esq. His agent then sold the rights to Emily Bestler, then vice president and editor-in-chief of Pocket Books. This resulted in the two-book deal that included The Hunted (later rebranded as book one of the OPSIG Team Black series).

== Writing style and philosophy ==
Jacobson writes primarily in the third person, although the serial killer chapters in The 7th Victim were written in the first person. His novels have elements of suspense, thriller, psychological suspense, action, and mystery. He has tackled historical fiction as well, in Inmate 1577 (Karen Vail #4), Spectrum (Karen Vail #6) and briefly in Dark Side of the Moon (OPSIG Team Black #4).

The character of Karen Vail was originally conceived in the mid-1990s as a one-chapter FBI agent. But once Jacobson started writing her, he could not stop. He realized he had to find a vehicle for her, and during his research work with the FBI's Behavioral Analysis Unit, he knew the perfect place for her would be as the first female FBI profiler, in a book featuring her. He was influenced by the strong wills and constitutions of both his mother and his wife, as well as Jacobson's own New York upbringing.

Jacobson wrote the first seventy-five pages of The 7th Victim in the first person point of view. However, his agent told him he could not use the first person because his first two novels (False Accusations and The Hunted) were written in the third person. He was frustrated because he thought it was some of his best writing, so he used Find/Replace in Microsoft Word and replaced all the I's with She's and so on. When he read what was left, he realized it was third person with a first person feel, very close to the reader. The reader was privy to Vail's internal thoughts, experiencing things as Vail experienced them, hearing what she was thinking. They are things that people think but never say aloud. Sometimes Vail does say them aloud, which can create problems with colleagues. These thoughts can be sarcastic or dry humor, and they can be very funny. Jacobson characterizes his discovery as being accidental.

Jacobson said that as the series has progressed, Vail has learned to tone it down her dry, New York sarcasm. She has grown as a person, that her evolution from book to book is tangible but subtle. Rather than verbalizing those acerbic and often very funny remarks as retorts, she is now more likely to keep them as thoughts between herself and the reader, like an inside joke.

=== Humor ===
Humor finds its way into many of Jacobson's novels. He feels that even in thriller and suspense writing, humor can be magical amid the tension. He says he never forces it, that it occurs organically. It is not until he reads the manuscript for the first time after finishing the first draft that he realizes how many funny exchanges there are between characters.

=== Characters ===
Jacobson believes that characters are of highest priority because that is what often keeps the reader reading. He calls this reader engagement. A successful novel must have characters that readers care about. If they don't develop a connection with the characters, reading that book would become a chore rather than something they look forward to doing.

=== Setting ===
Jacobson has said that settings are like characters and can help shape a story in key ways. Every place the characters go in his novels is vital to that particular story. Setting can serve as a stressor to that character if she's unfamiliar with that culture, if she does not know the geography, and so on. A test he uses is that if the story can be taken out of the city it is set in and placed in another city, he has not done a good job of integrating the setting into the story.

When possible, Jacobson writes parts of his novels on location in the places where his scenes are set. He feels inspired by the surroundings. One example of this was Inmate 1577 (Vail #4). Jacobson spent a lot of time researching Alcatraz, on the island and inside the penitentiary's cell house. Jacobson wrote some of the scenes right there, where his characters were interacting. He found it very stimulating.

A number of Jacobson's novels have international locations. The Lost Codex (OPSIG Team Black #3) is set in Washington, DC, New York City, England, France, Israel, the West Bank, and Gaza. No Way Out (Vail #5) is set entirely in England, with early chapters in Madrid, Spain. The Dark Side of the Moon is set in Washington, New York City, and Southern California, but half the novel occurs on the Moon. Jacobson's former English teacher, Louis Brill, commented that Jacobson's settings are so well researched you feel as though you are there. His description of Napa Valley made Brill want to go there.

=== Dialogue ===
Jacobson feels that dialogue is vital to a compelling novel. He once asked literary legend Elmore Leonard about how Leonard developed his ear for dialogue. He said he just hears it in his head. At first Jacobson laughed, but then realized that that's how he does it. His characters speak to him. His ear comes from concepts he learned in his playwriting workshop course at Queens College, his life experiences, contact with people all over the world and hearing their word choice, cadence, sentence length, etc. James Patterson told Jacobson the same thing. Jacobson asked how Patterson was able to write the dialogue of black people so well. It came from Patterson's Newburgh, New York upbringing.

Jacobson said that writing dialogue looks easy, but like any art, it takes time, practice, and effort to make it look effortless.

=== Craft ===
Early in Jacobson's writing career, his first two novels ended with major twists. His agent wanted him to become a modern-day O'Henry with trademark twists at the end. Jacobson felt that although twists are important to the genre, he did not want to limit himself by constructing a story for the main purpose of concluding with a twist. He is happy if a story and its characters lend themselves to that turn-on-a-dime ending, but he did not want that to be his sole focus.

Jacobson is an outliner, though he does not write chapter outlines. He prefers instead to write a narrative description of what happens, and when. These outlines can run up to sixty pages. This allows him the flexibility to modify the story as he discovers information during the research phase and as new ideas come to him while writing. While this happens often and he rewrites on the spot, his endings never change.

Jacobson has become known as a novelist who heavily researches his books. During his twenty-five year career, Jacobson has embedded himself with law enforcement officers across a range of agencies, including several years with the FBI's Behavioral Analysis Unit in Quantico; the DEA, US Marshals Service, the Bureau of Alcohol, Tobacco, Firearms and Explosives (ATF), the NYPD, SWAT, and local bomb squads. He has also worked extensively with the US military, Scotland Yard, criminals, armorers, helicopter and fighter pilots, CEOs, historians, combat surgeons, astronauts, rocket scientists, and Navy SEALs. He said that working with the agents, detectives, and officers allows him to go behind the scenes, ask them questions, see them in their environment, and try out their equipment. Hearing their stories, seeing how they approach different scenarios, sitting in their labs or tactical vehicles, observing them handling criminals and running investigations are the things he takes back with him to the keyboard when writing his novels.

Jacobson never intended to write a series. He had seen colleagues become stale writing the same character in the same setting, essentially writing the same book over and over. When approached by his publisher, Roger Cooper, who was prepping The 7th Victim for production, Cooper asked when the next book in the Karen Vail series would be ready. Jacobson told him that The 7th Victim was a one-off, a standalone novel. Cooper told him all the sales reps and bookstores loved Vail and wanted more. Jacobson said he would have to think about it and figure out a way of keeping Vail, and himself, fresh from book to book. About a week later, he figured out how to make that happen and the Karen Vail series was born. In retrospect, Jacobson credited Cooper in the acknowledgments to No Way Out (Vail #5), stating that without Cooper's urging, the adventures he has had so much fun writing might never have occurred.

Being new to writing a series, Jacobson consulted with both Michael Connelly and Lee Child for advice on what to do and what to avoid. He received completely opposing answers: Connelly suggested he write the best book he can at the time, put everything in it, and worry about the next book later. Child, on the other hand, advocated doling out the information one book at a time, spreading out the revelations a little at a time, with each novel. Jacobson realized that the reason for the difference in their perspectives was the nature of their characters: Harry Bosch is a grounded, career law enforcement officer who follows rules, while Jack Reacher is a drifter who has no rules to follow. Based on this Jacobson felt that Connelly's style fit more with what Jacobson intended for Vail as a series character.

Jacobson felt the bottom line is that he doesn't want the reader to put the book down, where they lose interest and close the book forever. There has to be something that drives the story forward, whether that be intrigue, suspense, mystery, and/or the characters themselves. Good pacing, realistic dialogue, a vivid setting, and rich writing are all key components to a compelling read.

== Research with law enforcement, military, others ==
Jacobson has stated that he prefers to learn about the way a law enforcement agency works and operates rather than fictionalizing, or just making it up. As a result, he has worked hands-on with the people who actually do the work he is writing about. That means going on ride-alongs with cops, spending time at the FBI's Behavioral Analysis Unit, shooting pistols and MP-5 submachine guns in the FBI Academy's indoor range, shadowing the SWAT team at their San Diego training facility, touring the DEA's drug laboratory and field offices, learning from members of the US Marshals' fugitive squad, and federal agencies' headquarters, working with chief inspectors at London's Scotland Yard and spending time at one of their "Met" police stations in a seedy part of town.

He has also worked closely with various branches of the military, from US Marine Corp captains, US Navy commanders, USAF lieutenant colonels, US Army lieutenant generals, and members of the special operations forces. He has taken military training courses in close quarters combat and weapons training at Craft International, where he worked with snipers, British special forces marksmen, protective detail members, retired military personnel, and active duty sheriffs deputies.

== Personal Safety eBook ==
Jacobson and retired FBI profiler Mark Safarik co-authored a book on personal safety entitled, "Staying Safe: from serial killers to identity thieves, a primer to keep you out of criminals' crosshairs." The book came about because of an interview Jacobson and Safarik did for The 7th Victim. They were discussing what steps a woman could take to prevent herself from falling victim to the tactics the killer uses in the opening scene. Afterwards, they realized it was important information that everyone should have. They set out to write an article but found they had too much information and ultimately wrote a book. It is updated periodically and given away for free on Jacobson's website as an incentive for readers to sign up for his author newsletter.

== Author cameo ==
In Spectrum (Karen Vail #6), waiter Al at the Woodro Deli was a tongue-in-cheek cameo for insiders. Jacobson worked at Woodro in 1982 as a busboy; the Spectrum scene was set in 1978.)

== Hollywood, Film options, TV series efforts ==
Several of Jacobson's novels have been optioned for film and/or television. One project made it to preproduction (The 7th Victim, Vail #1) when the plug was pulled. It was to be the seventh of twelve bestselling novels adapted to two-hour TV movies as part of TNT's Mystery Movie Night. Works by authors including Scott Turow, Sandra Brown, Lisa Gardner, Richard North Patterson, April Smith, Mary Higgins Clark and Carol Higgins Clark, and Alan Jacobson were to be produced. The first six aired to poor ratings and as a result the final six were canceled when the sponsors pulled their remaining $24 million budget.

It was not until a year later, when Jacobson was talking with Scott Turow, did Jacobson discover what had sunk the project. Ironically, the National Basketball Association (NBA) strike severely impacted TNT's overall ratings.

Jacobson's debut novel, False Accusations, was adapted into a TV movie in 2004 in the Czech Republic. Iconic screenwriter Jirí Hubac penned the screenplay based on Alan Jacobson's bestselling novel. The movie was directed by Zdenek Zelenka. It aired multiple times and was renewed for another set of airings in 2012.

== Short stories ==
Two of Jacobson's short stories have been published. The first, Fatal Twist, features FBI profiler Karen Vail and was published by The Strand magazine in 2012. The second, Double Take, features two characters from the Karen Vail series, Carmine Russo and Ben Dyer from Spectrum. Russo and Dyer were created for the short story, and were later integrated into Spectrum for the novel. Double Take what originally bundled with Hard Target (OPSIG #2) as a value-added bonus for the ebook release. It was subsequently sold separately.

== Bibliography ==
=== Stand Alone Novels/Short Stories ===
#	Title	Publication Date	Publisher
1	False Accusations^{1}	1999	Simon & Schuster
2	Fatal Twist (featuring Karen Vail)^{2}	2012	The Strand Magazine
3	Double Take (featuring Carmine Russo and Ben Dyer)^{3}	2013	Premier Publishing
4	Staying Safe^{4}	2013	Self Published/Ebook

=== OPSIG Team Black Series ===
#	Title	Publication Date	Publisher
1	The Hunted^{1}	2001	Simon & Schuster/Pocket Books
2	Hard Target^{2}	2012	Norwood Press/Premier Publishing
3	The Lost Codex^{3}	2015	Norwood Press/Open Road Media
4	Dark Side of the Moon^{4}	2018	Norwood Press/Open Road Media

=== FBI profiler Karen Vail series ===
#	Title	Publication Date	Publisher
1	The 7th Victim^{1}	2008	Vanguard Press/Perseus Books
2	Crush^{2}	2009	Vanguard Press/Perseus Books
3	Velocity^{3}	2010	Vanguard Press/Perseus Books
4	Inmate 1577^{4}	2011	Norwood Press/Premier Publishing
5	No Way Out^{5}	2012	Norwood Press/Premier Publishing
6	Spectrum^{6}	2013	Norwood Press/Open Road Media
7	The Darkness of Evil^{7}	2017	Norwood Press/Open Road Media

=== Essays ===
#	Title	Publication Date	Publisher
1	The Seductress, Hollywood vs. Author^{1}	2018	Rare Bird Books
