= Gone Are the Dayes =

1984 television film by Gabrielle Beaumont

- Genre: Comedy; Crime
- Written by: Bill Bleich; Jim Brecher
- Directed by: Gabrielle Beaumont
- Starring: Harvey Korman; Susan Anspach; Robert Hogan
- Music by: Jerrold Immel
- Country of origin: United States
- Original language: English

Production
- Producer: Tom Leetch
- Production location: Los Angeles
- Cinematography: Richard N. Hannah
- Editor: Ernest Milano
- Running time: 90 minutes
- Budget: $2.5 million

Original release
- Network: Disney Channel
- Release: May 1984

Gone Are the Dayes is a 1984 American made-for-television crime comedy film produced by Walt Disney Productions directed by Gabrielle Beaumont and starring Harvey Korman, Susan Anspach and Robert Hogan. It originally aired in May 1984 on the Disney Channel as their second feature film.

== Plot ==
When the Daye family goes out to dinner, they become accidental witnesses to a gangland slaying at a Japanese restaurant. One of the mobsters, Nick Delgado, is shot and captured, and the family reluctantly agrees to testify against him for the government. After Nick's father, mobster Papa Delgado, sends his other son Frank to silence the Dayes, the FBI assigns Charlie Mitchell, a grizzled and unlucky veteran agent, to protect them until the trial.

== Cast ==
- Harvey Korman as Charlie Mitchell
- Susan Anspach as Phyllis Daye
- Robert Hogan as Harry Daye
- Nate Esformes as Papa Delgado
- Joe Cortese as Frank Delgado
- Victoria Carroll as Gilda Fleming
- Bibi Besch as District Attorney
- Joshua Bryant as Fred Cooper
- Mary Jo Catlett as Marge
- David Glasser as Ricky Daye
- Sharee Gregory as Melissa Daye
- Justin Lord as Don
- Steven Hirsch as Joe
- Elizabeth Savage as Nurse #1
- Ted Gehring as Cook
- Beatrice Colen as Estelle
- Eldon Quick as Seymour
- Lawrence Kerr as Nick
- Jim Boeke as Seth
- Rodney Kageyama as Manager of Restaurant
- Raymond Guth as Farmer #1
- Daniel Greene as Larry
- Mickey Jones as Mad Dog
- Olaf Pooley as Grand Master
- Hap Lawrence as Brother #1
- Phil Rubenstein as Brother #2
- Robert Snively as Brother #3
- Michael Cornelison as Newscaster
- Beau Starr as Big Man
- Julius Harris as Man #1
- John Dresden as Man #2
- Twyla Littleton as Girl #1
- Lynn Herring as Girl #2
- Joan Leizman as Nurse #2
- Hettie Lynne Hurtes as TV Newscaster
- Tad Horino as Waiter
- Austin Kelly as Vagrant
- Greg Finley as Ranger
- Dirk Dahl as Mike
- Kirk Scott as Purser
- Morris Buchanan as Bailiff

== Release & reception ==
Gone Are the Dayes was released by Walt Disney Home Video through VHS and Betamax in December 1984. Disney Channel president James P. Jimirro remarked that the film was "received very well - strongly enough to encourage us to move forward vigorously with additional movies."

| Preceded by Tiger Town | Disney Channel Original Movies | Succeeded by Love Leads the Way |
