= List of best-selling films in the United States =

This list of best-selling films in the United States is a list of the best-selling home video film titles sold in the United States. This list only includes physical media (such as VHS, DVD and Blu-ray), and does not include digital purchases or video rentals.

== Best-selling films ==
This is a list of the best-selling film titles sold in the United States across all physical home video formats, including VHS, DVD, and Blu-ray Disc (BD).

Title	Video release	All formats	VHS	DVD	Blu-ray	Revenue (est.)
The Lion King	March 3, 1995	48,500,000	32,000,000	11,900,000	3,680,000	$852,000,000
Finding Nemo	November 4, 2003	40,600,000	520,000	38,800,000	1,320,000	$801,400,000
Snow White and the Seven Dwarfs	October 28, 1994	36,000,000	28,000,000	5,070,000	2,960,000	$598,000,000
Aladdin	October 1, 1993	34,630,000	30,000,000	2,820,000	1,810,000	$748,000,000
Beauty and the Beast	October 30, 1992	34,000,000	22,000,000	7,500,000	4,500,000	$554,000,000
Titanic	September 1, 1998	30,300,000	25,000,000	4,900,000	390,000	$655,000,000
Toy Story	October 29, 1996	26,650,000	21,000,000	4,920,000	730,000	$401,000,000
Avatar	April 22, 2010	26,500,000	—N/a	19,000,000	7,450,000	$400,000,000
Jurassic Park	October 4, 1994	26,000,000	24,000,000	1,480,000	520,000	$345,000,000
Spider-Man	November 1, 2002	26,000,000	6,500,000	19,500,000	16,000	$727,000,000
The Little Mermaid	May 18, 1990	25,870,000	10,000,000	13,400,000	2,470,000	$565,000,000
Cinderella	October 4, 1988	25,800,000	17,000,000	7,280,000	1,470,000	$293,000,000
Shrek	November 2, 2001	25,300,000	15,400,000	9,900,000	—N/a	$450,000,000
Independence Day	November 22, 1996	24,300,000	22,000,000	1,960,000	384,000	$588,000,000
Cars	November 7, 2006	23,400,000	—N/a	23,100,000	320,000	$334,000,000
Frozen	March 18, 2014	22,400,000	—N/a	14,600,000	7,785,000	$415,651,000
The Dark Knight	December 9, 2008	21,800,000	—N/a	19,200,000	2,620,000	$317,000,000
One Hundred and One Dalmatians	April 10, 1992	21,100,000	15,900,000	4,580,000	590,000	$264,000,000
How the Grinch Stole Christmas	November 20, 2001	20,800,000	12,800,000	7,390,000	650,000	$337,000,000
Shrek 2	November 5, 2004	20,700,000	2,000,000	18,710,000	—N/a	$348,000,000

== Best-selling films by format ==
=== VHS ===
This is a list of the best-selling VHS titles in the United States.

Title	Distributor	VHS release	Sales	Revenue (est.)	Revenue (est. inflation)
The Lion King	Buena Vista Home Video	March 3, 1995	32,000,000	$520,000,000	$1,099,000,000
Aladdin	Buena Vista Home Video	October 1, 1993	30,000,000	$625,000,000	$1,390,000,000
Snow White and the Seven Dwarfs	Buena Vista Home Video	October 28, 1994	28,000,000	$430,000,000	$934,000,000
Titanic	Paramount Home Video	September 1, 1998	25,000,000	$500,000,000	$988,000,000
Jurassic Park	Universal Studios Home Video	October 4, 1994	24,000,000	$315,000,000	$647,000,000
Beauty and the Beast	Buena Vista Home Video	October 30, 1992	22,000,000	$318,000,000	$730,000,000
Independence Day	20th Century Fox Home Entertainment	November 22, 1996	22,000,000	$550,000,000	$1,129,000,000
Toy Story	Buena Vista Home Video	October 29, 1996	21,000,000	$290,000,000	$595,000,000
Pocahontas	Buena Vista Home Video	February 27, 1996	17,100,000	$216,000,000	$443,000,000
Cinderella	Buena Vista Home Video	October 4, 1988	17,000,000	$108,000,000	$294,000,000
Toy Story 2	Buena Vista Home Entertainment	October 17, 2000	16,600,000	$290,000,000	$560,000,000
Forrest Gump	Paramount Home Video	April 27, 1995	16,000,000	Unknown	Unknown
One Hundred and One Dalmatians	Buena Vista Home Video	April 10, 1992	15,900,000	$150,000,000	$344,000,000
Shrek	DreamWorks Home Entertainment	November 2, 2001	15,400,000	$254,000,000	$462,000,000
The Return of Jafar	Buena Vista Home Video	May 20, 1994	15,000,000	$345,000,000	$749,000,000
E.T. the Extra-Terrestrial	MCA Home Video	October 25, 1988	15,000,000	$300,000,000	$850,000,000
The Lion King II: Simba's Pride	Buena Vista Home Entertainment	October 27, 1998	15,000,000	$300,000,000	$593,000,000
Fantasia	Buena Vista Home Video	November 1, 1991	14,200,000	$209,000,000	$494,000,000
Mrs. Doubtfire	Fox Video	April 26, 1994	14,000,000	Unknown	Unknown
Pinocchio	Buena Vista Home Video	March 26, 1993	13,400,000	$335,000,000	$728,000,000
How the Grinch Stole Christmas	Universal Studios Home Video	November 20, 2001	12,800,000	$206,000,000	$375,000,000
The Aristocats	Buena Vista Home Video	April 24, 1996	12,800,000	Unknown	Unknown
The Hunchback of Notre Dame	Buena Vista Home Video	March 4, 1997	12,500,000	$200,000,000	$395,000,000
Home Alone	Fox Video	August 22, 1991	11,000,000	$275,000,000	$650,000,000
Bambi	Buena Vista Home Video	September 28, 1989	10,600,000	$168,000,000	$436,000,000
Tarzan	Buena Vista Home Entertainment	February 1, 2000	10,500,000	$210,000,000	$406,000,000
Batman	Warner Home Video	November 15, 1989	10,500,000	$190,000,000	$493,000,000
Aladdin and the King of Thieves	Buena Vista Home Video	August 13, 1996	10,300,000	$257,000,000	$528,000,000
The Little Mermaid	Buena Vista Home Video	May 18, 1990	10,000,000	$270,000,000	$554,000,000
Babe	MCA/Universal Home Video	March 19, 1996	10,000,000	Unknown	Unknown
Oliver & Company	Buena Vista Home Video	September 24, 1996	10,000,000	Unknown	Unknown

=== DVD ===
This is a list of the best-selling DVD titles in the United States.

Title	Distributor	DVD release	Sales	Revenue	Source(s)
Finding Nemo	Buena Vista Home Entertainment	November 4, 2003	38,800,000	$677,000,000	
Cars	Buena Vista Home Entertainment	November 7, 2006	23,100,000	$326,000,000	
Spider-Man	Columbia TriStar Home Entertainment	November 1, 2002	19,500,000	$565,000,000	
The Dark Knight	Warner Home Video	December 9, 2008	19,200,000	$283,000,000	
Avatar	20th Century Fox Home Entertainment	April 22, 2010	19,000,000	$235,000,000	
Shrek 2	DreamWorks Home Entertainment	November 5, 2004	18,200,000	$316,000,000	
Transformers	DreamWorks Home Entertainment	October 16, 2007	17,000,000	$295,000,000	
Pirates of the Caribbean: The Curse of the Black Pearl	Buena Vista Home Entertainment	December 2, 2003	16,600,000	$316,000,000	
Pirates of the Caribbean: Dead Man's Chest	Buena Vista Home Entertainment	December 5, 2006	16,500,000	$318,000,000	
The Incredibles	Buena Vista Home Entertainment	March 15, 2005	15,600,000	$285,000,000	
Pirates of the Caribbean: At World's End	Walt Disney Studios Home Entertainment	December 4, 2007	15,500,000	$314,000,000	
Star Wars: Episode III – Revenge of the Sith	20th Century Fox Home Entertainment	November 1, 2005	15,100,000	$269,000,000	
Despicable Me	Universal Studios Home Entertainment	December 14, 2010	15,100,000	$202,000,000	
The Matrix	Warner Home Video	September 21, 1999	15,000,000	$375,000,000	
Ratatouille	Walt Disney Studios Home Entertainment	November 6, 2007	15,000,000	$189,000,000	
The Polar Express	Warner Home Video	November 22, 2005	14,800,000	$223,000,000	
The Lord of the Rings: The Two Towers	New Line Home Entertainment	August 26, 2003	14,700,000	$280,000,000	
Frozen	Walt Disney Studios Home Entertainment	March 18, 2014	14,600,000	$250,000,000	
Up	Walt Disney Studios Home Entertainment	November 10, 2009	13,800,000	$232,000,000	
Twilight	Summit Entertainment	March 21, 2009	13,500,000	$238,000,000	
300	Warner Home Video	July 31, 2007	13,400,000	$277,000,000	
The Little Mermaid	Buena Vista Home Entertainment	October 3, 2006	13,400,000	$218,000,000	
Happy Feet	Warner Home Video	March 27, 2007	13,100,000	$207,000,000	
The Lord of the Rings: The Return of the King	New Line Home Entertainment	May 25, 2004	12,500,000	$257,000,000	
WALL-E	Walt Disney Studios Home Entertainment	November 18, 2008	12,500,000	$204,000,000	
Monsters, Inc.	Buena Vista Home Entertainment	September 17, 2002	12,300,000	$215,000,000	
The Chronicles of Narnia: The Lion, the Witch and the Wardrobe	Buena Vista Home Entertainment	April 4, 2006	12,200,000	$447,000,000	
The Lord of the Rings: The Fellowship of the Ring	New Line Home Entertainment	August 6, 2002	12,000,000	$257,000,000	
The Lion King	Buena Vista Home Entertainment	October 7, 2003	11,900,000	$220,000,000	
Madagascar	DreamWorks Home Entertainment	November 15, 2005	11,900,000	$213,000,000	
Shrek the Third	Paramount Home Entertainment	November 13, 2007	11,800,000	$177,000,000	
Spider-Man 2	Sony Pictures Home Entertainment	November 30, 2004	11,600,000	$174,000,000	
Harry Potter and the Order of the Phoenix	Warner Home Video	December 11, 2007	11,500,000	$254,000,000	
The Hangover	Warner Home Video	December 15, 2009	11,500,000	$200,000,000	
The Jungle Book	Buena Vista Home Entertainment	October 2, 2007	11,300,000	$281,000,000	
Harry Potter and the Goblet of Fire	Warner Home Video	March 7, 2006	11,100,000	$542,000,000	
Transformers: Revenge of the Fallen	Paramount Home Entertainment	October 20, 2009	11,000,000	$222,000,000	
Toy Story 3	Walt Disney Studios Home Entertainment	November 2, 2010	10,800,000	$192,000,000	
The Twilight Saga: Eclipse	Summit Entertainment	December 4, 2010	10,800,000	$181,000,000	
Iron Man	Paramount Home Entertainment	September 30, 2008	10,700,000	$182,000,000	
The Passion of the Christ	20th Century Fox Home Entertainment	August 31, 2004	10,500,000	$189,000,000	
The Twilight Saga: New Moon	Summit Entertainment	March 20, 2010	10,400,000	$204,000,000	

=== Blu-ray ===
This is a list of the best-selling Blu-ray Disc (BD) titles in the United States.

Rank	Title	Distributor	BD release	Sales	Revenue
1	Frozen	Walt Disney Studios Home Entertainment	March 18, 2014	7,600,000	$161,000,000
2	Avatar	20th Century Fox Home Entertainment	April 22, 2010	7,470,000	$164,000,000
3	Despicable Me 2	Universal Studios Home Entertainment	December 10, 2013	5,940,000	$115,000,000
4	Beauty and the Beast	Walt Disney Studios Home Entertainment	October 5, 2010	4,500,000	$102,000,000
5	Star Wars: The Force Awakens	Walt Disney Studios Home Entertainment	April 5, 2016	5,920,000	$152,000,000
6	The Avengers	Walt Disney Studios Home Entertainment	September 25, 2012	5,260,000	$120,000,000
7	The Lord of the Rings: The Motion Picture Trilogy	New Line Home Entertainment	April 6, 2010	4,336,413	$257,128,953
8	Jurassic World	Universal Studios Home Entertainment	October 20, 2015	4,315,469	$96,753,967
9	Snow White and the Seven Dwarfs	Walt Disney Studios Home Entertainment	October 6, 2009	3,993,495	$100,639,067
10	Guardians of the Galaxy	Walt Disney Studios Home Entertainment	December 9, 2014	3,950,000	$83,000,000

=== LaserDisc ===
This is a list of the best-selling LaserDisc (LD) titles in the United States.

Title	Distributor	LD release	Sales	Source(s)
Terminator 2: Judgment Day	LIVE Home Video	1993	350,000	
The Lion King	Buena Vista Home Video	1995	150,000	
Snow White and the Seven Dwarfs	Buena Vista Home Video	1994	100,000	
True Lies	Fox Video	1995	100,000	

=== UMD ===
This is a list of the best-selling films on Sony's proprietary Universal Media Disc (UMD) format for the PlayStation Portable (PSP) platform in the United States.

Title	Distributor	UMD release	Sales	Source(s)
Spider-Man 2	Sony Pictures Home Entertainment	2005	1,000,000	
Final Fantasy VII: Advent Children	Sony Pictures Home Entertainment	2005	470,000	

== Best-selling film series (VHS) ==
Series	VHS debut	Sales	Revenue (est.)
Aladdin	October 1, 1993	55,300,000	$1,230,000,000
The Lion King	March 3, 1995	47,000,000	$820,000,000
The Land Before Time	September 14, 1989	45,000,000	$1,000,000,000
Toy Story	October 29, 1996	36,100,000	$580,000,000
Star Wars Trilogy	September 1, 1982	35,000,000	$873,000,000

== Best-selling films by year ==
This is a list of the best-selling video titles sold on physical media (including VHS, DVD and Blu-ray) in the United States by year.

=== 1984–1985 ===
Best-selling video cassettes (July 1984 to June 1985)
Rank	Title	Original release	Sales
1	Jane Fonda's Workout	1982	150,000+
2	Gone with the Wind	1939	150,000+
3	Purple Rain	1984	100,000+
4	Star Trek III: The Search for Spock	1984	< 100,000

=== 1990 ===
Rank	Title	Sales
1	The Little Mermaid	9,000,000
3	Peter Pan	7,000,000
5	Pretty Woman	6,900,000
7	Honey, I Shrunk the Kids	6,000,000

=== 1993 ===
Rank	Title	Sales
1	Aladdin	30,000,000
2	Pinocchio	13,500,000
3	Beauty and the Beast	Unknown
4	Barney	Unknown
5	Homeward Bound: The Incredible Journey	Unknown
6	Free Willy	Unknown
7	Home Alone 2: Lost in New York	Unknown
8	One Hundred and One Dalmatians	Unknown
9	Sister Act	Unknown
10	Ghost	Unknown

=== 1994 ===
Rank	Title
1	Snow White and the Seven Dwarfs
2	Jurassic Park
3	The Fox and the Hound
4	Mrs. Doubtfire
5	The Return of Jafar
6	Aladdin
7	Barney
8	Once Upon a Forest
9	Free Willy
10	The Fugitive

=== 1995 ===
Rank	Title
1	The Lion King
2	Forrest Gump
3	Cinderella
4	The Santa Clause
5	Snow White and the Seven Dwarfs
6	The Mask
7	Casper
8	Angels in the Outfield
9	Speed
10	Batman Forever

=== 1996 ===
Rank	Title	Sales	Ref
1	Independence Day	22,000,000	
2	Toy Story	21,000,000	
3	Pocahontas	17,000,000	
4	The Aristocats	12,800,000	
5	Aladdin and the King of Thieves	10,300,000	
6	Oliver & Company	10,000,000	
7	Twister	9,500,000	
8	Babe	8,000,000+	
9	Muppet Treasure Island	8,000,000	
10	All Dogs Go to Heaven 2	6,000,000	

=== 1988–1996 ===
Rank	Title	Release	Sales	Revenue	Inflation	Ref
1	The Lion King	March 3, 1995	32,000,000	$520,000,000	$1,099,000,000	
2	Aladdin	October 1, 1993	30,000,000	$500,000,000	$1,110,000,000	
3	Snow White and the Seven Dwarfs	October 28, 1994	28,000,000	$430,000,000	$934,000,000	
4	Jurassic Park	October 4, 1994	24,000,000	$315,000,000	$647,000,000	
5	Beauty and the Beast	October 30, 1992	22,000,000	$318,000,000	$730,000,000	
5	Independence Day	November 22, 1996	22,000,000	Unknown	Unknown	
7	Toy Story	October 29, 1996	21,000,000	$290,000,000	$595,000,000	
8	Pocahontas	February 27, 1996	17,100,000	$216,000,000	$443,000,000	
9	Cinderella	October 4, 1988	17,000,000	$108,000,000	$294,000,000	
10	Forrest Gump	April 27, 1995	16,000,000	Unknown		

=== 1997 ===
Rank	Title	Sales
1	101 Dalmatians	15,000,000
2	Men in Black	14,000,000
3	The Hunchback of Notre Dame	12,500,000
4	The Lost World: Jurassic Park	12,000,000
5	The Empire Strikes Back	10,000,000
6	Return of the Jedi	10,000,000
7	Star Wars	10,000,000
8	Liar Liar	9,000,000
9	Space Jam	8,500,000
10	George of the Jungle	7,200,000

=== 2006 ===
Rank	Title	Sales	Revenue
1	Pirates of the Caribbean: Dead Man's Chest	14,476,924	$274,307,204
2	Cars	13,198,050	$208,489,867
3	The Chronicles of Narnia: The Lion, the Witch and the Wardrobe	11,541,429	$332,737,406
4	Harry Potter and the Goblet of Fire	10,506,129	$207,907,139
5	Wedding Crashers	8,426,280	$138,091,895
6	King Kong	7,593,120	$140,091,801
7	Over the Hedge	7,571,037	$120,893,405
8	Ice Age: The Meltdown	7,323,372	$119,646,977
9	Walk the Line	7,099,384	$120,356,749
10	The Little Mermaid	6,873,207	$105,855,230

=== 2007 ===
Rank	Title	Sales	Revenue
1	Pirates of the Caribbean: At World's End	13,699,490	$279,046,391
2	Transformers	13,251,378	$251,422,293
3	Happy Feet	12,225,634	$196,875,349
4	300	12,110,490	$243,204,618
5	Ratatouille	11,233,232	$169,016,024
6	Shrek the Third	10,889,584	$162,691,569
7	Harry Potter and the Order of the Phoenix	9,905,305	$200,157,478
8	Night at the Museum	8,585,495	$145,161,282
9	The Departed	7,458,254	$138,809,474
10	Spider-Man 3	6,845,349	$114,754,483

=== 2008 ===
Rank	Title	Sales	Revenue
1	The Dark Knight	10,944,319	$191,678,575
2	Iron Man	8,400,343	$151,418,634
3	Alvin and the Chipmunks	7,559,643	$127,641,260
4	Kung Fu Panda	7,486,642	$115,040,292
5	WALL-E	7,413,548	$117,131,222
6	I Am Legend	7,043,136	$126,160,041
7	National Treasure: Book of Secrets	5,863,257	$92,955,147
8	Enchanted	5,322,631	$86,315,101
9	Indiana Jones and the Kingdom of the Crystal Skull	5,314,370	$103,340,817
10	Bee Movie	4,712,821	$75,473,010

=== 2009 ===
Rank	Title	Sales	Revenue
1	Transformers: Revenge of the Fallen	11,154,737	$251,247,838
2	Twilight	10,405,491	$198,416,222
3	Up	10,160,995	$199,248,148
4	Star Trek	8,717,856	$142,561,921
5	Harry Potter and the Half-Blood Prince	8,547,218	$118,628,758
6	The Hangover	8,068,523	$148,835,183
7	Madagascar: Escape 2 Africa	7,789,128	$107,713,190
8	X-Men Origins: Wolverine	5,646,233	$101,074,698
9	Monsters vs. Aliens	5,430,970	$99,548,530
10	Ice Age: Dawn of the Dinosaurs	5,229,856	$90,338,613

=== 2010 ===
Rank	Title	Sales	Revenue
1	Avatar	15,984,303	$308,421,543
2	Toy Story 3	10,967,197	$209,605,460
3	The Twilight Saga: New Moon	8,564,722	$186,703,432
4	The Twilight Saga: Eclipse	8,209,155	$154,745,017
5	The Blind Side	7,925,127	$113,533,863
6	Iron Man 2	6,931,591	$157,661,923
7	Despicable Me	6,675,913	$127,226,540
8	How to Train Your Dragon	6,255,514	$136,006,186
9	Alice in Wonderland	5,229,486	$101,783,950
10	Inception	5,204,776	$104,473,794

=== 2011 ===
Rank	Title	Sales	Revenue
1	Harry Potter and the Deathly Hallows – Part 1	9,918,642	$143,167,689
2	Harry Potter and the Deathly Hallows – Part 2	8,137,963	$128,580,195
3	Tangled	8,096,773	$144,241,933
4	Cars 2	5,838,012	$107,894,962
5	Transformers: Dark of the Moon	4,742,541	$89,875,729
6	Bridesmaids	4,738,083	$72,368,721
7	Rio	4,728,294	$76,558,227
8	Megamind	4,073,992	$63,076,062
9	The Help	3,836,404	$73,441,093
10	The Hangover Part II	3,809,848	$59,482,742

=== 2012 ===
Rank	Title	Sales	Revenue
1	The Hunger Games	10,260,319	$180,306,529
2	The Avengers	9,380,157	$190,683,937
3	Brave	8,031,037	$145,230,978
4	The Dark Knight Rises	7,681,848	$124,340,808
5	The Twilight Saga: Breaking Dawn – Part 1	7,025,392	$132,531,680
6	The Lorax	6,386,831	$107,251,718
7	Ted	5,327,684	$101,882,232
8	Sherlock Holmes: A Game of Shadows	5,090,104	$77,689,629
9	Madagascar 3: Europe's Most Wanted	3,965,694	$65,665,489
10	Puss in Boots	3,635,289	$65,695,382

=== 2013 ===
Rank	Title	Sales	Revenue
1	Despicable Me 2	9,256,658	$170,985,093
2	The Twilight Saga: Breaking Dawn – Part 2	6,330,303	$95,048,591
3	The Hobbit: An Unexpected Journey	6,243,460	$98,989,683
4	Monsters University	5,492,411	$111,012,114
5	Skyfall	5,158,688	$95,600,230
6	Fast & Furious 6	5,067,428	$103,474,129
7	Wreck-It Ralph	4,775,100	$112,300,386
8	Man of Steel	4,548,095	$90,507,424
9	Hotel Transylvania	3,828,329	$77,045,672
10	Taken 2	3,589,443	$61,043,038

=== 2014 ===
Rank	Title	Sales	Revenue
1	Frozen	18,146,499	$335,295,426
2	The Hunger Games: Catching Fire	6,223,060	$110,892,615
3	Guardians of the Galaxy	5,300,895	$95,542,781
4	The Lego Movie	4,864,495	$105,187,209
5	The Hobbit: The Desolation of Smaug	4,666,637	$95,121,267
6	How to Train Your Dragon 2	3,661,804	$62,111,911
7	Maleficent	3,652,429	$66,967,622
8	Teenage Mutant Ninja Turtles	3,644,860	$79,849,311
9	Transformers: Age of Extinction	3,587,127	$57,979,925
10	Thor: The Dark World	3,424,818	$63,725,360

=== 2015 ===
Rank	Title	Sales	Revenue
1	Jurassic World	5,830,947	$116,230,988
2	Inside Out	5,281,960	$95,451,757
3	Minions	5,241,405	$94,062,288
4	Big Hero 6	5,058,550	$96,750,237
5	The Hunger Games: Mockingjay – Part 1	4,533,392	$73,036,788
6	American Sniper	4,299,577	$73,823,666
7	Furious 7	4,188,485	$66,411,157
8	Avengers: Age of Ultron	3,671,021	$68,150,184
9	The Hobbit: The Battle of the Five Armies	3,394,509	$70,269,361
10	Home	3,369,212	$59,815,243

=== 2016 ===
Rank	Title	Sales	Revenue
1	Star Wars: The Force Awakens	7,433,275	$174,271,258
2	Finding Dory	5,479,887	$91,542,276
3	Zootopia	4,783,887	$96,827,503
4	Deadpool	4,756,364	$84,593,757
5	Captain America: Civil War	3,903,614	$73,300,722
6	The Secret Life of Pets	3,564,882	$78,158,675
7	Batman v Superman: Dawn of Justice	3,548,159	$73,864,026
8	The Good Dinosaur	3,065,028	$58,193,536
9	The Hunger Games: Mockingjay – Part 2	2,831,212	$49,456,053
10	Suicide Squad	2,501,924	$63,717,229

=== 2017 ===
Rank	Title	Sales	Revenue
1	Moana	4,394,672	$116,286,634
2	Beauty and the Beast	4,255,929	$85,131,977
3	Rogue One: A Star Wars Story	3,985,851	$81,081,110
4	Wonder Woman	3,850,584	$93,095,921
5	Trolls	3,530,413	$73,822,484
6	Guardians of the Galaxy Vol. 2	3,342,461	$64,933,483
7	Sing	3,298,699	$62,868,456
8	Fantastic Beasts and Where to Find Them	2,780,803	$57,143,378
9	Spider-Man: Homecoming	2,612,740	$57,143,378
10	Logan	2,284,265	$46,549,464

=== 2018 ===
Rank	Title	Sales	Revenue
1	Black Panther	4,491,947	$91,442,758
2	The Greatest Showman	4,382,399	$66,902,034
3	Star Wars: The Last Jedi	4,056,387	$87,221,669
4	Coco	3,773,022	$72,832,051
5	Avengers: Infinity War	3,741,298	$112,828,246
6	Incredibles 2	3,370,994	$66,651,533
7	Jumanji: Welcome to the Jungle	3,350,043	$65,038,272
8	Deadpool 2	3,345,571	$58,730,229
9	Thor: Ragnarok	3,216,969	$67,412,970
10	Jurassic World: Fallen Kingdom	3,035,911	$59,335,071

=== 2019 ===
Rank	Title	Sales	Revenue
1	Avengers: Endgame	4,806,816	$104,154,360
2	Captain Marvel	4,901,758	$66,146,654
3	Aquaman	4,214,687	$61,119,252
4	Bohemian Rhapsody	3,088,534	$59,105,423
5	Toy Story 4	2,820,074	$53,605,464
6	Spider-Man: Far From Home	2,652,007	$50,840,371
7	Shazam!	2,593,510	$40,600,377
8	Spider-Man: Into The Spider-Verse	2,535,116	$45,683,480
9	The Lion King	2,524,396	$48,516,017
10	John Wick: Chapter 3 – Parabellum	2,401,206	$41,580,101

=== 2020 ===
Rank	Title	Sales	Revenue
1	Frozen 2	3,739,473	$80,123,767
2	Star Wars: The Rise of Skywalker	2,691,715	$66,690,252
3	Joker	2,511,092	$52,246,944
4	Jumanji: The Next Level	2,421,044	$48,420,597
5	Trolls: World Tour	2,152,432	$48,760,415
6	Sonic The Hedgehog	1,950,402	$41,585,643
7	1917	1,933,433	$41,635,374
8	Midway	1,632,035	$29,269,879
9	Scoob!	1,549,248	$26,093,819
10	Harry Potter: The Complete Collection Years 1-7	1,538,582	$65,166,550

=== 2021 ===
Rank	Title	Sales	Revenue
1	Wonder Woman 1984	1,647,462	$38,742,601
2	The Croods: A New Age	1,370,601	$28,668,190
3	Godzilla vs. Kong	1,239,621	$34,572,483
4	F9: The Fast Saga	1,231,883	$28,917,323
5	Raya and the Last Dragon	1,000,001	$22,827,081
6	Black Widow	875,874	$21,548,641
7	Venom: Let There Be Carnage	851,538	$23,987,825
8	Harry Potter: The Complete Collection Years 1-7	829,825	$35,370,498
9	Free Guy	632,279	$16,965,010
10	Dr. Seuss’ The Grinch	582,238	$9,368,257

=== 2022 ===
Rank	Title	Sales	Revenue
1	Spider-Man: No Way Home	2,011,788	$44,247,382
2	Top Gun: Maverick	1,970,839	$46,376,059
3	Jurassic World: Dominion	1,265,746	$30,079,421
4	Dune	1,011,202	$19,115,182
5	Ghostbusters: Afterlife	976,369	$19,364,466
6	No Time to Die	877,077	$20,927,806
7	Encanto	873,833	$12,270,459
8	The Batman	857,943	$15,701,209
9	Sing 2	819,297	$10,475,845
10	Top Gun	798,846	$10,606,903

=== 2023 ===
Rank	Title	Sales	Revenue
1	The Super Mario Bros. Movie	1,438,349	$26,762,885
2	John Wick: Chapter 4	1,293,563	$24,994,527
3	Avatar: The Way of Water	832,617	$21,447,379
4	Top Gun: Maverick	748,227	$17,180,341
5	Black Panther: Wakanda Forever	746,910	$9,611,417
6	Fast X	696,647	$14,755,924
7	Black Adam	678,322	$16,580,390
8	Barbie	651,894	$11,335,434
9	Oppenheimer	650,441	$17,315,254
10	Guardians of the Galaxy Vol. 3	617,603	$15,393,349

=== 2024 ===
Rank	Title	Sales	Revenue
1	Deadpool & Wolverine	806,490	$20,989,401
2	Godzilla x Kong: The New Empire	643,507	$14,924,202
3	Dune: Part Two	533,828	$12,991,453
4	Oppenheimer	466,464	$11,653,510
5	The Hunger Games: The Ballad of Songbirds & Snakes	422,953	$7,506,689
6	Ghostbusters: Frozen Empire	419,704	$10,650,345
7	Aquaman and the Lost Kingdom	402,210	$8,631,885
8	Wonka	401,731	$8,322,844
9	Despicable Me 4	356,086	$7,074,558
10	Twisters	351,264	$8,518,129

== See also ==
- List of highest-grossing films in the United States and Canada
- List of best-selling albums in the United States
- Walt Disney Classics
