= Walt Disney Classics =

Series of VHS releases of Disney movies

The first logo of Walt Disney Classics, from 1984 to 1988

Walt Disney Classics (also known as The Classics from Walt Disney Home Video and Disney's Black Diamond edition) was a video line launched by WDTNT to release Disney animated features on home video. The first title in the "Classics" line was Robin Hood which was released towards the end of 1984. This was followed by 19 other titles until early 1994, with The Fox and the Hound. Disney followed up on the "Classics" series by porting over the released titles (except Pinocchio, Fantasia, The Fox and the Hound, The Great Mouse Detective, The Rescuers Down Under, Beauty and the Beast, and Aladdin) to the "Masterpiece Collection" line, while continuing to use the "Classics" moniker in countries outside North America until 2007. Starting in the 2010s these videocassettes also dubbed "Black Diamond" became highly sought-after due to a public misconception about their rarity and actual value.

== Background ==
In 1980, Disney established its own video distribution operation as part of Walt Disney Telecommunications and Non-Theatrical Company (WDTNT) with Jim Jimirro as its first president. Home video was not considered to be a major market by Disney at the time. WDTNT Co. also handled marketing of other miscellaneous ancillary items such as short 8 mm films for home movies. Disney's first releases on videotape were 13 titles that were licensed for rental to Fotomat on March 4, 1980. This first group of titles on VHS marketed under the Walt Disney Home Video brand included 10 live action movies and 3 compilations of short cartoons: Pete's Dragon, The Black Hole, The Love Bug, Escape to Witch Mountain, Davy Crockett, King of the Wild Frontier, 20,000 Leagues Under the Sea, Bedknobs and Broomsticks, The North Avenue Irregulars, The Apple Dumpling Gang, Hot Lead and Cold Feet, On Vacation with Mickey Mouse and Friends, Kids is Kids starring Donald Duck, Adventures of Chip 'n' Dale. Numerous other titles and re-releases were released at later dates throughout the early 1980s. These all came in a white clam-shell case which gave a distinctive appearance.

== History ==
The first two movies released through video cassette that Disney would later call a "classic" was Dumbo and Alice in Wonderland in June 1981. Initially released as "rental only" titles, both movies were later made available for sale. Dumbo was released sometime in early 1982, and Alice in Wonderland was released later that same year in November. Aside from these two titles, Disney was initially reluctant to release 15 specific feature length videos which executives referred to as "untouchables". This later changed when Michael Eisner became the chief executive officer (CEO) of The Walt Disney Company in September 1984. When Eisner saw a "big-screen version" of Pinocchio in theaters at the end of 1984, he decided to pilot a video cassette launch. According to Billboard magazine, the release of Robin Hood on December 3, 1984 was "relatively unexpected". Disney gave the program "a relatively short pre-order period", and was confident that a seven-year theatrical release cycle could co-exist with home media.

The Walt Disney classics include 15 animated feature films – Snow White and the Seven Dwarfs, Pinocchio, Fantasia, Bambi, Cinderella, Peter Pan, Lady and the Tramp, Sleeping Beauty, 101 Dalmatians, The Sword in the Stone, The Jungle Book, The Aristocats, Robin Hood, The Rescuers, and The Fox and the Hound – which had only been shown at theaters, not television or any other format (except for The Sword in the Stone, which aired on television in 1985 for the first time).

By the time the Masterpiece Collection replaced the Classics collection in the domestic market, Snow White and the Seven Dwarfs and The Aristocats were the only two of the original 15 classics (and in fact, the sole two pre-1985 single-narrative animated features) that had not yet been released to video or shown on television.

== North American releases ==
No.	Release date	Title	Initial cost (USD)	Copies sold (Domestic) (Note: Unless noted otherwise, these figures are limited to first VHS releases.)	Short summary
1	December 3, 1984	Robin Hood	$79.95 (Note: The LaserDisc version was $34.95.)	100,000+ (Note: This figure is for the late 1985 re-release.)	Robin Hood was first re-released in late 1985, and then for a second time on July 12, 1991.
2	July 16, 1985	Pinocchio	$79.95	125,000 (Note: This figure is for July/August 1985. Pinocchio was later re-released on March 26, 1993 and sold 13.5 million copies.)	Pinocchio was reissued theatrically in 1984 to great success, grossing over $26 million at the domestic box office. In the following year Disney announced a July 16, 1985, release date for Pinocchio, with a $1 million advertising campaign which they claimed was the first national network TV spot campaign for a single video title. The VHS price was lowered considerably for the re-release which ran from October 14, 1986 to January 31, 1987. A newly remastered edition of Pinocchio was released on video on March 26, 1993.
3	November 5, 1985	Dumbo	$79.95	Unknown	The price of Dumbo was also dropped to $29.95 along with Robin Hood and Pinocchio in 1985. Dumbo never went into moratorium, and was repackaged in 1989 with additional promotions in 1991.
4	March 1986	The Sword in the Stone	$79.95	75,000	The Sword in the Stone was repackaged in 1989 with the release of Bambi and was repromoted with another VHS re-release in 1991.
5	May 28, 1986	Alice in Wonderland	$29.95	Unknown	Alice in Wonderland was originally released as a rental-only in the Walt Disney Home Video line. It was re-released on May 28, 1986 for sell-through for the first time as part of Disney's "Wonderland Campaign". While the number of videos sold for Alice in Wonderland is unknown, it was reported by Billboard that over 650,000 units had been shipped for the overall sale. This movie was never placed on moratorium and was repromoted in 1991.
6	October 14, 1986	Sleeping Beauty	$29.95	1,000,000+	Sleeping Beauty was the first title to be released in VHS Hi-Fi and in stereo sound. The film became the centerpiece for Disney's $6 million promotional campaign, "Bring Disney Home For Good" which featured all six of the animated Classics released up to the end of 1986. The film went into moratorium on March 31, 1988.
7	October 7, 1987	Lady and the Tramp	$29.95	3,200,000	Following the success of Sleeping Beauty, when Disney released Lady and the Tramp on October 7, 1987 the VHS already had 2 million pre-orders. Lady and the Tramp eventually sold 3.2 million copies, making it the best-selling videocassette at the time. It later lapsed into moratorium on March 31, 1988 along with Sleeping Beauty, having grossed $100 million in sales revenue.
8	October 4, 1988	Cinderella	$26.99 (Note: A special $26.99 price was available until the end of November 1988, after which the price went up to the $29.95 price point of the other Classics.)	7,200,000	A limited edition lithograph, created by animator Marc Davis was available to anyone who pre-ordered the title between July 11 and October 3, 1988. It was announced in advance that the film would go into moratorium on April 30, 1989. Cinderella was another success for Disney having grossed $108 million in sales revenue.
9	September 28, 1989	Bambi	$26.99	9,800,000	Bambi was the first Disney video to have a cross-promotion. The price of $26.99 could be reduced with a $3.00 rebate (available until the end of January 1990) by sending in proofs of purchase of two tubes of Crest toothpaste. The film went into moratorium on March 30, 1990.
10	May 18, 1990	The Little Mermaid	$26.99	10,000,000+	The Little Mermaid was priced at $26.99, the same as Bambi, but this time a $3 rebate was available from Disney with no additional purchase required. Disney promised its biggest TV advertising campaign ever, along with extensive print advertising. By July 30, 1990, The Little Mermaid had sold 7.5 million cassettes, and it eventually sold 10 million units, making it the top-selling video release of 1990. The film went into moratorium on April 30, 1991.
11	September 21, 1990	Peter Pan	$24.99	7,000,000	Peter Pan was released with a cross-promotion with Nabisco, available from the release date through the holiday season. This allowed consumers a $5.00 rebate with the purchase of three boxes of crackers, bringing the effective retail price under $20.00. The film later went into moratorium on April 30, 1991.
12	May 3, 1991	The Jungle Book	$24.99	7,400,000	The Jungle Book was originally sold for $24.99; a $5.00 rebate was offered by Nabisco, reducing the price even further. The film later went into moratorium on April 30, 1992.
13	September 17, 1991	The Rescuers Down Under	$24.99	5,200,000	The Rescuers Down Under was priced at $24.99 with a $5.00 mail-in refund available from Procter & Gamble. It later went on moratorium on April 30, 1993.
14	November 1, 1991	Fantasia	$24.99	14,200,000	Roy Disney originally objected to Fantasia being released on VHS as part of Walt Disney Classics series as he felt it was too important to the family's legacy. Michael Eisner was eventually able to convince the Disney Family to let the film be released. Fantasia was Disney's first animated film to be released simultaneously worldwide (in North America plus 46 international territories).
15	April 10, 1992	101 Dalmatians	$24.99	11,100,000	101 Dalmatians went on moratorium on April 30, 1993.
16	July 17, 1992	The Great Mouse Detective	$24.99	5,000,000 (projected)	The Great Mouse Detective went on moratorium on April 30, 1993. While the exact amount of copies sold is unknown, a projected amount of 5,000,000 copies was given by The New York Times on July 16, 1992.
17	September 18, 1992	The Rescuers	$24.99	5,500,000 (projected)	According to Billboard Magazine, The Rescuers was expected to sell 5 to 6 million videos. It later went on moratorium April 30, 1993.
18	October 30, 1992	Beauty and the Beast	$24.99	20,000,000+	Beauty and the Beast sold 20 million cassettes and brought $200 million in revenue. Disney opted to delay the laserdisc release for the theatrical version of Beauty and the Beast until September 29, 1993, making a film festival-screened "work-in-progress" print on disc available in the interim. It was the first Disney animated film to have a widescreen laserdisc release. Beauty and the Beast went on moratorium on April 30, 1993.
19	September 29, 1993	Aladdin	$24.99	30,000,000+	Aladdin is the best-selling release of the Walt Disney Classics line. The VHS was first released on September 29, 1993 to video retailers, although it was not officially advertised until October 1. By early 1994, it had sold more than 25 million cassettes with over $500 million in revenue before being put on moratorium on April 30, 1994. Disney delayed the laserdisc release of Aladdin for nearly a year; it was eventually released, in both letterbox and pan-and-scan formats, on September 21, 1994.
20	March 4, 1994	The Fox and the Hound	$24.99	10,000,000	This was the last film released in the Walt Disney Classics line, it went on moratorium on April 30, 1995.

== Rarity ==
Decades after their release, there has been a public misconception that every "Black Diamond Edition" title from the Walt Disney Classics VHS line are very rare and valuable. According to Kodak, "Tapes don't last for long due to remanence decay of the magnetic charge, causing blacked-out scenes, discoloration and eventually, entire loss of footage." They also gave a time frame by saying that tapes "degrade 10% to 20% throughout 10 to 25 years".

Kristy Ambrose from The Gamer called the phenomenon a "craze" which might be driven by nostalgia, and also stated that "Consumers have been learning some hard lessons about market manipulation and the power of trends". Rain Blanken from WDW Magazine called the eBay listings "bogus" and "hyped up", warning people that "Every outlet is saying these are listed for high prices… not sold." This is also mentioned by Snopes, which call the claim "Are 'Black Diamond' Disney VHS Tapes Worth Thousands of Dollars?" mostly false. They state that no buyers are bidding anywhere close to those asking prices for the tapes. Those that did sell for thousands of dollars are described by Snopes as a "rarity/fluke".

In terms of consignment, Heritage Auctions has placed in their "Vintage VHS Tapes Value Guide" that the most desirable VHS tapes released between 1979 and 1990 are still in their original factory shrink wrap. Further value is added if studio watermarks are present on the wrap. In regard to Disney "Black Diamond Editions", Heritage states that aside from a couple of titles, Disney animated films released on VHS after 1990 are not worth anything significant, and "Only the earliest of Disney VHS produced prior to 1985 hold any value to most collectors." Things to look for on their guide include a sealed tape, a studio logo on the shrink-wrap, and if the latest year listed on the back of the cover is prior to 1986.

== See also ==
- List of Walt Disney Animation Studios films
- List of best-selling films in the United States
