= A Tale of Two Critters =

- Theatrical release poster
- Directed by: Jack Speirs
- Screenplay by: Jack Speirs
- Produced by: Jack Speirs
- Narrated by: Mayf Nutter
- Edited by: G. Gregg McLaughlin
- Music by: Buddy Baker
- Production company: Walt Disney Productions
- Distributed by: Buena Vista Distribution
- Release date: June 22, 1977
- Running time: 48 minutes
- Country: United States
- Language: English

A Tale of Two Critters is an American adventure documentary film produced by Walt Disney Productions, written and directed by Jack Speirs and released theatrically by Buena Vista Distribution on June 22, 1977.

== Premise ==
A glimpse at the relationship that develops between a young raccoon and a bear cub. As they play together in the splendor of the Pacific Northwest, the two grow into adulthood through a spirited odyssey filled with adventure in the wilds.

== Cast ==
- Mayf Nutter as Narrator

== Home media ==
The exact release date for a Tale of Two Critters to VHS format is unknown. It was however, mentioned in the magazine High Fidelity for their April 1982 issue under "New programming".

As of 2014, the film is available as a digital download on Amazon Video, YouTube and iTunes Store.

As of 2020, the film is available to stream on Disney's streaming service, Disney+.
