= Tiger Town =

- Genre: Drama; Family; Sport
- Written by: Alan Shapiro
- Directed by: Alan Shapiro
- Starring: Roy Scheider; Justin Henry
- Music by: Eddy L. Manson
- Country of origin: United States
- Original language: English

Production
- Producer: Susan B. Landau
- Production location: Detroit
- Cinematography: Robert Elswit
- Editors: Richard A. Harris; John F. Link
- Running time: 90 minutes
- Production company: Walt Disney Television

Original release
- Network: Disney Channel
- Release: October 9, 1983

Tiger Town is a 1983 American made-for-television sports drama film starring Roy Scheider as an aging baseball player for the Detroit Tigers, and Justin Henry as a devoted young fan. Written and directed by Detroit native Alan Shapiro, with executive producer Susan B. Landau, the production was filmed on location in and around Tiger Stadium.

Tiger Town originally aired October 9, 1983 on the Disney Channel as the first installment of Disney Channel Premiere Films. Following a limited theatrical release in the Detroit area in June 1984 (coinciding with the Tigers’ best season in franchise history), the film won the CableACE Award for Best Dramatic Special in 1984. It subsequently aired on ABC in 1986 as the Disney Sunday Movie.

== Plot ==
Alex and his father are devoted Detroit Tigers fans, even now as they are struggling. Alex's favorite player is aging star Billy Young, who is having a sub-par season, which is also his last. His only remaining wish is to play in the World Series before retiring.

Alex's father dies unexpectedly, but not before he tells Alex that he should always believe. Consequently, Alex decides to visit every Tiger home game. Every time Young comes to the plate, Alex closes his eyes and wishes hard, and Young ends up hitting a home run. Thanks to Young's rejuvenated play, the Tigers start winning again.

But there is a price. Alex, who now believes that if he doesn't go to the games, the team will lose (explaining the Tigers' pitiful road trips); finds himself the subject of ridicule by classmates, since he often sneaks out of school early to watch the Tigers play. Nevertheless, thanks to Billy Young, the Tigers claw their way back into the pennant race. The final game of the season, against the Baltimore Orioles, would decide the pennant.

Alex has his ticket and school lets out early so kids can watch the game, but as Alex leaves school, he is detained by a gang of bullies who take his ticket and his money. Only when Alex gets his principal's attention is he released and forced to run all the way to Tiger Stadium. Bribing a little girl for her bike and hanging onto the back of a city bus gets Alex to the stadium in time for the ninth inning, where Young is up and the Tigers are trailing. Young makes contact with the ball just as Alex gets to the front of the stadium aisle, and Young ends up clearing the bases, giving the Tigers the American League East title and securing a chance to play in the American League Championship Series, thus one step closer to Young's wish to play in the World Series.

In real life, the Tigers would win the World Series the very next year (1984).

== Cast ==
- Roy Scheider as Billy Young
- Justin Henry as Alex
- Ron McLarty as Buddy
- Bethany Carpenter as Nancy
- Lindsay Barr as Peanut Vendor
- Dave Bokas as Crusty Man
- Chris Bremer as Loud Kid
- Katie Delozier as Little Girl
- Jack Fish as Stadium Guard
- Noah Moazezi as Eddie
- Gerlad L. Monford as Lunch Room Kid
- Leon Smith s Druggist
- Ralph Valatka as Hot Dog Vendor
- Whit Vernon as Mr. Cullen
- Von Washington as Souvenir Vendor
- Larry Williams as Bus Driver
- Al Ackerman as Sportscaster
- Sparky Anderson as Tigers Manager
- Ernie Harwell as Radio Announcer
- Ray Lane as Radio Announcer
- Mary Wilson as Soloist

== Cameos ==
Several Detroit broadcasters and celebrities appear as themselves in the movie. Tigers manager Sparky Anderson appears frequently in the movie. Mary Wilson, a former Supreme, sings the national anthem before the final game. Also appearing are Ernie Harwell, the legendary play-by-play radio voice of the Tigers; Detroit sportscaster Ray Lane, as Ernie's partner; and then-WDIV sportscaster Al Ackerman — who would help coin the rally cry “Bless You Boys” for the 1984 season.

Harwell and Lane were paired in the radio booth calling games on WJR radio from 1967 to 1972.

Ackerman was a sports anchor for Detroit's WXYZ-TV and WDIV-TV in the 1970s and 1980s.

== Alternate Titles ==
Country	Title
Japan	ロイ・シャイダーのファイナル・イニング
Brazil	A Força da Esperança
France	Les Tigres
South Korea	마지막 타석
Spain	El equipo de los tigres
Germany	Super Cup
Mexico	El Mago del Baseball

== See also ==
- List of baseball films

Preceded by N/A	Disney Channel Original Movies	Succeeded by Gone Are the Dayes
