= List of My Favorite Murder episodes =

American podcast

My Favorite Murder is an American podcast hosted by Karen Kilgariff and Georgia Hardstark. My Favorite Murder released its first episode on January 13, 2016.

The podcast format includes regular episodes, "minisodes", celebrity hometowns, and recorded live shows. Minisodes usually consist of listeners' stories, often referred to as "hometown murders," regardless of the type of story told. Celebrity hometowns involve Karen and Georgia sitting down with celebrity guests to hear their stories, from hometown murders to personal accounts of mayhem to legendary family lore. Live shows and regular shows share a common numbering sequence while minisodes follow a separate numbering system. Live shows are not given a number unless they are then released as an episode of My Favorite Murder.

== List of episodes ==
| No. | Title | Subject | Original release date |
|---|---|---|---|
| 559 | "We Simply Can’t" | Navajo Code Talker of World War II Chester Nez; Wine scammer Rudy Kurniawan | November 19, 2026 |
| Rewind | "Rewind with Karen & Georgia - Episode 125: Bedside Astrologer" | An episode 125 listening party | November 18, 2026 |
| Minisode | "Minisode 514" | A goth vs. evil; Grandma vs. Al Capone | November 16, 2026 |
| 558 | "Eat the Wrapper" | The unresolved murder of Sherri Orofino; The Route 66 Bunion Derby | November 12, 2026 |
| Rewind | "Rewind with Karen & Georgia - Episode 124: Errant Duct Tape" | An episode 124 listening party | November 11, 2026 |
| Minisode | "Minisode 513" | A crime against the Mayor of Flavortown; Vigilante justice with the Skarsgard brothers | November 9, 2026 |
| 557 | "Be Different Later" | The murder of Hilda Roche; The Peanut Corporation of America scandal | November 5, 2026 |
| Rewind | "Rewind with Karen & Georgia - Episode 123: Live at Vicar Street in Dublin" | An episode 123 listening party | November 4, 2026 |
| Minisode | "Minisode 512" | A boyfriend baby modeling contest; A third man encounter | November 2, 2026 |
| 556 | "The Halloween Special" | The Salem Witch Trials; The Bell Witch haunting | October 29, 2026 |
| Rewind | "Rewind with Karen & Georgia - Episode 121: Clomp Everywhere" | An episode 121 listening party | October 28, 2026 |
| Minisode | "Minisode 511" | Halloween hometowns; Ghost bullying; A French costume fail | October 26, 2026 |
| 555 | "Live at Bass Concert Hall (Austin Night 2)" | The Marfa Lights; Otto Koehler and the Three Emmas | October 22, 2026 |
| Rewind | "Rewind with Karen & Georgia - Episode 120: Live at the Orpheum in Los Angeles" | An episode 120 listening party | October 21, 2026 |
| Minisode | "Minisode 510" | 90s babysitting hijinx; A bee attack on a school trip | October 19, 2026 |
| 554 | "Inflaishment" | The Marcos regime and the Manila Film Center disaster | October 15, 2026 |
| Rewind | "Rewind with Karen & Georgia - Episode 119: Fingers Everywhere" | An episode 119 listening party | October 14, 2026 |
| Minisode | "Minisode 509" | A corded phone catastrophe; A toddler conwoman | October 12, 2026 |
| 553 | "Ohio, Let’s Say" | The story of Tilikum, the killer whale | October 8, 2026 |
| Rewind | "Rewind with Karen & Georgia - Episode 118: Golden State Killer Caught!" | An episode 118 listening party | October 7, 2026 |
| Minisode | "Minisode 508" | A child ouija board story; A junior high underground DVD rental empire | October 5, 2026 |
| Bonus–Episode | "Bonus Episode" | Karen and Georgia give listeners advice about moms dating scammers, finding true love and proper kitchen etiquette. Presented by Cars.com | October 2, 2026 |
| 552 | "She Was Such A Cat" | The unsolved Lane Bryant murders; The story of Houston’s Chicano Squad | October 1, 2026 |
| Rewind | "Rewind with Karen & Georgia - Episode 117: Reality’s Canceled" | An episode 117 listening party | September 30, 2026 |
| Minisode | "Minisode 507" | A grade school loan shark; Your shameful moments! | September 28, 2026 |
| 551 | "I Won’t See You Later" | America’s first sleepwalking murder defense; The story of Ming, Tiger of Harlem | September 24, 2026 |
| Rewind | "Rewind with Karen & Georgia - Episode 116: Robot Grandma" | An episode 116 listening party | September 23, 2026 |
| Minisode | "Minisode 506 - The Dolly Parton Tribute Minisode" | This week’s hometowns are Dolly Parton-themed!; Dolly scaring a 5 year old; A birthday wig party | September 21, 2026 |
| 550 | "Short and Problem-Based" | The murder of Kalinka Bamberski; Who Wants to be a Millionaire cheating scandal | September 17, 2026 |
| Rewind | "Rewind with Karen & Georgia - Episode 114: Civic Order" | An episode 114 listening party | September 16, 2026 |
| Minisode | "Minisode 505" | This week’s hometowns celebrate Grandparents Day!; Nana’s mafia run-in; A grandma prank | September 14, 2026 |
| 549 | "Let’s Action!" | In honor of the 25th anniversary of 9/11, Karen covers the Heroes of the 88th Floor | September 10, 2026 |
| Rewind | "Rewind with Karen & Georgia - Episode 113: Live at Kingsbury Hall in Salt Lake City" | An episode 113 listening party | September 9, 2026 |
| Minisode | "Minisode 504" | This week’s hometowns celebrate teachers for back to school!; A hero teacher; A nun slapping story | September 7, 2026 |
| Bonus–Episode | "Bonus Episode" | Karen and Georgia give listeners advice about lottery numbers, seeing the face of the moon and tramp stamped. Presented by Cars.com | September 4, 2026 |
| 548 | "It’s Like, Whoa" | Trailblazing baseball legend Jackie Robinson | September 3, 2026 |
| Rewind | "Rewind with Karen & Georgia - Episode 112: Galore Galore!" | An episode 112 listening party | September 2, 2026 |
| Minisode | "Minisode 503" | A Children of the Corn-style child labor story; St. Paddy’s Day snake party | August 31, 2026 |
| 547 | "Always on the Precipice" | ”Witch Doctor” murderer Mona Fandey; The Knightsbridge Security Deposit heist | August 27, 2026 |
| Rewind | "Rewind with Karen & Georgia - Episode 111: Figure It Out, Kevin" | An episode 111 listening party | August 26, 2026 |
| Minisode | "Minisode 502" | A grandpa switcher funeral story; A mom’s Tinder date gone wrong | August 24, 2026 |
| 546 | "A Superstar of the Early 70s" | Atlanta serial killer Michael Terry; The Acali expedition a.k.a. the sex raft | August 20, 2026 |
| Rewind | "Rewind with Karen & Georgia - Episode 110: Live at the Palace Theatre in Columbus" | An episode 110 listening party | August 19, 2026 |
| Minisode | "Minisode 501" | Report from the real Transylvania University; Teen forgery scam | August 17, 2026 |
| 545 | "Don’t You Like Weirdos?" | The case of Dr. John Schneeberger; The Napoleonic Hoax | August 13, 2026 |
| Rewind | "Rewind with Karen & Georgia - Episode 109: Project Artichoke" | An episode 109 listening party | August 12, 2026 |
| Minisode | "Minisode 500" | Two-genre emails to celebrate the 500th minisode! | August 10, 2026 |
| Bonus–Episode | "Bonus Episode" | Karen and Georgia give listeners advice about weddings, friendship, cats, family boundaries and baby-name drama. Presented by Cars.com | August 7, 2026 |
| 544 | "Everything Is Worth It" | Paul Fronczak’s Triple Disappearance; The 1990 Michigan Wedding Sting | August 6, 2026 |
| Rewind | "Rewind with Karen & Georgia - Episode 108: King of Police" | An episode 108 listening party | August 5, 2026 |
| Minisode | "Minisode 499" | Grandma’s vape secret; A baby race at the mall | August 3, 2026 |
| 543 | "Live at the Arlene Schnitzer Concert Hall (Portland Early Show)" | The Martin Family disappearance; The Grant High School Bandits | July 30, 2026 |
| Rewind | "Rewind with Karen & Georgia - Episode 107: Live At The Revolving Stage at the Celebrity Theatre" | An episode 107 listening party | July 29, 2026 |
| Minisode | "Minisode 498" | Scam-themed hometowns in honor or our newest podcast, Royal Swindle; A 19-year-old fake doctor; An Arabian horse pyramid scheme | July 27, 2026 |
| Special | "My Favorite Murder Presents…Royal Swindle" | The premiere episode of Royal Swindle, produced Exactly Right Network, Blanchard House and USG Audio and hosted by Becky Milligan | July 24, 2026 |
| 542 | "Dracula Ambitions" | Scam-themed in honor of our newest podcast, Royal Swindle; The Roslyn School Embezzlement Scandal; Elizabeth Bigly, the scamming “Queen of Ohio” | July 23, 2026 |
| Rewind | "Rewind with Karen & Georgia - Episode 106: Courage Shoulders" | An episode 106 listening party | July 22, 2026 |
| Minisode | "Minisode 497" | Parkouring to avoid arrest; A playground Ponzi scheme | July 20, 2026 |
| 541 | "House or Wife" | The Pandora’s Box murder; Levee tampering and 1993’s Great Mississippi Flood | July 16, 2026 |
| Rewind | "Rewind with Karen & Georgia - Episode 105: Proclensity" | An episode 105 listening party | July 15, 2026 |
| Minisode | "Minisode 496" | A cab ride gone wrong; Nana’s birthday cake mixup | July 13, 2026 |
| 540 | "Battery and Rock Night" | The murder of Peter Falconio and survival of Joanne Lees; Chilean World Cup Scandal | July 9, 2026 |
| Rewind | "Rewind with Karen & Georgia - Episode 104: Garden Party" | An episode 104 listening party | July 8, 2026 |
| Minisode | "Minisode 495" | A goat gland grifter; Dance class with Liza Minelli | July 6, 2026 |
| 539 | "It Keeps Getting Ruined" | America’s first high-profile murder; The Kentucky Meat Shower | July 2, 2026 |
| Rewind | "Rewind with Karen & Georgia - Episode 103: Live At The Balboa Theatre in San Diego" | An episode 103 listening party | July 1, 2026 |
| Minisode | "Minisode 494" | Petaluma owls; A Matthew Shepard tribute | June 29, 2026 |
| 538 | "726 Demerits" | Buffalo Calf Road Woman, the Cheyenne warrior who defeated Custer | June 25, 2026 |
| Rewind | "Rewind with Karen & Georgia - Episode 102: Decompressions" | An episode 102 listening party | June 24, 2026 |
| Minisode | "Minisode 493" | Scary doll in a wall; Email from the Vatican City listener | June 22, 2026 |
| 537 | "Live at the Paramount Theatre (Seattle Night 2)" | Infamous McDonald Siblings; ”DB Tuber” Brinks robbery | June 18, 2026 |
| Rewind | "Rewind with Karen & Georgia - Episode 101: Live At The Majestic Theatre in Dallas" | An episode 101 listening party | June 17, 2026 |
| Minisode | "Minisode 492" | Rabies at church camp; Two legendary trash dads | June 15, 2026 |
| Bonus–Episode | "Bonus Episode" | Actor and inventor Hedy Lamarr; Tennis champion Billie Jean King and the Battle of the Sexes | June 12, 2026 |
| 536 | "Smart ’n Tricky" | ”Roofman” robberies; SoHo grifter Anna Delvey | June 11, 2026 |
| Rewind | "Rewind with Karen & Georgia - Episode 100: The 100th Episode" | An episode 100 listening party | June 10, 2026 |
| Minisode | "Minisode 491" | Dog breaking into prison; ’90’s money machine | June 8, 2026 |
| 535 | "Mute It For Sure" | The life, death, and legacy of Matthew Shepard | June 4, 2026 |
| Rewind | "Rewind with Karen & Georgia - Episode 99: Shin Kick" | An episode 99 listening party | June 3, 2026 |
| Minisode | "Minisode 490" | Dorothea Puente connection; High school scammer | June 1, 2026 |
| 534 | "Think About the Simulation" | Legacy and murder of Haing S. Ngor; Henderson Luelling and his “doomed Quaker sex cult" | May 28, 2026 |
| Rewind | "Rewind with Karen & Georgia - Episode 98: Grasp It" | An episode 98 listening party | May 27, 2026 |
| Minisode | "Minisode 489" | Younger sister posing as grandma for booze; Train derailment with shocking twist | May 25, 2026 |
| 533 | "An Exercise in Frustration" | Mental health rights pioneer Elizabeth Packard; The Aconcagua Mountain Mystery | May 21, 2026 |
| Rewind | "Rewind with Karen & Georgia - Episode 97: The Hague" | An episode 97 listening party | May 20, 2026 |
| Minisode | "Minisode 488" | FLDS encounter; ”Trash parents” who forgot their kid at church | May 18, 2026 |
| 532 | "We’re Being Artists Here" | Shakespeare being performed at the Broadmoor asylum; Wisconsin Butter Fire | May 14, 2026 |
| Rewind | "Rewind with Karen & Georgia - Episode 96: Live at the Hard Rock in Orlando" | An episode 96 listening party | May 13, 2026 |
| Minisode | "Minisode 487" | Sleepwalking into a stranger’s house; Prom Robbery | May 11, 2026 |
| 531 | "We’re Here at the House Party" | Pilot Hazel Ying Lee; Dunbar Armored Depot Heist | May 7, 2026 |
| Rewind | "Rewind with Karen & Georgia - Episode 95: Gesus" | An episode 95 listening party | May 6, 2026 |
| Minisode | "Minisode 486" | Celebration of mom-level job holders | May 4, 2026 |
| 530 | "The Great Guy Law-Time Spectacular Part II" | Guy Branum tells the story of Baljinder Kaur’s defense in the murder of mother-in-law Baljit Kaur | April 30, 2026 |
| Rewind | "Rewind with Karen & Georgia - Episode 94: Go Get Your Thing" | An episode 94 listening party | April 29, 2026 |
| Minisode | "Minisode 485" | A ferry captain’s folly; A close encounter with the Golder State Killer | April 27, 2026 |
| 529 | "How About Logical?" | Gilgo Beach murders; The Great Diamond Hoax | April 23, 2026 |
| Rewind | "Rewind with Karen & Georgia - Episode 93: Live at The Grove in Anaheim" | An episode 93 listening party | April 22, 2026 |
| Minisode | "Minisode 484" | 4/20-themed hometowns | April 20, 2026 |
| Special | "MFM Presents… Disgraceland" | My Favorite Murder presents the hit music podcast Disgraceland hosted by Jake Brennan, now on the Exactly Right Network. This episode is “Patti Smith: How True Crime Helped the ‘Godmother of Punk’ Survive.” | April 17, 2026 |
| 528 | "In a Business Way" | Disappearance of Brian Shaffer; The Van Meter Visitor | April 16, 2026 |
| Rewind | "Rewind with Karen & Georgia - Episode 92: The Halloween Special" | An episode 92 listening party | April 15, 2026 |
| Minisode | "Minisode 483" | Disgraceland-themed hometowns | April 13, 2026 |
| 527 | "Disgraceland" | In celebration of Exactly Right’s newest podcast, Disgraceland, Karen and Georgia talk to creator/host Jake Brennan | April 9, 2026 |
| Rewind | "Rewind with Karen & Georgia - Episode 91: Live at the Sony Centre in Toronto" | An episode 91 listening party | April 8, 2026 |
| Minisode | "Minisode 482" | Jonas Brothers 911 call; Online dating red flags | April 6, 2026 |
| 526 | "Virginia Slim Minute" | Junko Tabei, the first woman to climb Mount Everest | April 2, 2026 |
| Rewind | "Rewind with Karen & Georgia - Episode 90: Peak Experience" | An episode 90 listening party | April 1, 2026 |
| Minisode | "Minisode 481" | Easter and Passover -themed hometowns | March 30, 2026 |
| 525 | "Snap It Out" | 1942 Oregon State Hospital poisoning; World War II hero Marion Pritchard | March 26, 2026 |
| Rewind | "Rewind with Karen & Georgia - Episode 89: The Finch" | An episode 89 listening party | March 25, 2026 |
| Minisode | "Minisode 480" | Hometowns in honor of Women’s History Month, including survival stories and columnist Marilyn Hagerty | March 23, 2026 |
| 524 | "Get Your Blade Hands Ready" | 2012 Costa Concordia disaster; Beauty Magnate Madam C.J. Walker | March 19, 2026 |
| Rewind | "Rewind with Karen & Georgia - Episode 88: Live at the Comedy Theatre" | An episode 88 listening party | March 18, 2026 |
| Minisode | "Minisode 479" | Dad lost at sea; Tiger Shark Rescue | March 16, 2026 |
| 523 | "I’m the Loudest, You’re the Smartest" | Bad Bridgets; Mohammed Islam’s teenage day trading hoax | March 12, 2026 |
| Rewind | "Rewind with Karen & Georgia - Episode 87: Hither and Yon" | An episode 87 listening party | March 11, 2026 |
| Minisode | "Minisode 478" | Mafia grandma; Generational trash parenting | March 9, 2026 |
| 522 | "Live at the Paramount Theatre (Denver Night 2)" | Reporter Polly Pry; The Stanley Hotel | March 5, 2026 |
| Rewind | "Rewind with Karen & Georgia - Episode 86: Live at the Enmore Theatre" | An episode 86 listening party | March 4, 2026 |
| Minisode | "Minisode 477" | Solved cold case; Sinkhole in Mexico | March 1, 2026 |
| 521 | "I Can Count to Solo" | 92nd Infantry war heroes Lieutenant Vernon Baker and Lieutenant John R. Fox | February 26, 2026 |
| Rewind | "Rewind with Karen & Georgia - Episode 85: Live at the Boulder Theater" | An episode 85 listening party | February 25, 2026 |
| Minisode | "Minisode 476" | Wild bank heist; BTK encounter | February 23, 2026 |
| 520 | "Kind of Meant to Be-ish" | Rubin “Hurricane” Carter wrongful convictions; Lieutenant Leon Crane survival story | February 19, 2026 |
| Rewind | "Rewind with Karen & Georgia - Episode 84: Harvard 2" | An episode 84 listening party | February 18, 2026 |
| Minisode | "Minisode 475" | Prank mom; Murderino origin story | February 16, 2026 |
| 519 | "Giants of Any Kind" | Ruby Bridges; George Remus | February 12, 2026 |
| Rewind | "Rewind with Karen & Georgia - Episode 83: The MFM + Unqualified with Anna Faris Crossover Pt 2" | An episode 83 listening party | February 11, 2026 |
| Minisode | "Minisode 474" | Valentine's Day themed | February 9, 2026 |
| 518 | "Two-Faced: Live at the San Diego Civic Theatre (San Diego Night 1)" | disappearance of Aimee Semple McPherson; Ed Newcomer's investigation into butterfly trafficker Yoshi Kojima | February 5, 2026 |
| Rewind | "Rewind with Karen & Georgia - Episode 82: The MFM + Unqualified with Anna Faris Crossover Pt 1" | An episode 82 listening party | February 4, 2026 |
| Minisode | "Minisode 473" | near John Wayne Gacy victim; reverse dog kidnapping | February 2, 2026 |
| 517 | "Two-Faced: John of God" | Two-Faced: John of God | January 29, 2026 |
| Rewind | "Rewind with Karen & Georgia - Episode 81: Weapon Bush" | An episode 81 listening party | January 28, 2026 |
| Minisode | "Minisode 472" | tooth gold; live show puker | January 26, 2026 |
| 516 | "End Quote" | murder of Dorothy Donovan; Gwyneth Paltrow's ski collision trial | January 22, 2026 |
| Rewind | "Rewind with Karen & Georgia - Episode 80: Live at the Rams Head Live" | An episode 80 listening party | January 21, 2026 |
| Minisode | "Minisode 471" | Poe Toaster; grandma getaway driver | January 19, 2026 |
| 515 | "10 Year Anniversary Special!" | top 10 listener-voted MFM moments | January 15, 2026 |
| Rewind | "Rewind with Karen & Georgia - Episode 79: Sharpest Needle in the Tack" | An episode 79 listening party | January 14, 2026 |
| Minisode | "Minisode 470" | mothman; cocaine bear; emus | January 12, 2026 |
| 514 | "Beef with Myself" | murders of Rose Burkert and Roger Atkinson; the unkillable Michael Malloy | January 8, 2026 |
| Rewind | "Rewind with Karen & Georgia - Episode 78: The Freshest Recording" | An episode 78 listening party | January 7, 2026 |
| Minisode | "Minisode 469" | babysitting in a tornado; psychic at a lesbian poker night | January 5, 2026 |
| 513 | "Best of the Year (Part II)" | Queen of Sinking Ships, Violet Jessop; Great Emu War | January 1, 2026 |
| Rewind | "Rewind with Karen & Georgia - Episode 77: Live at the Keswick Theatre" | An episode 77 listening party | December 31, 2025 |
| Minisode | "Minisode 468" | 12-year-old driving drunk parents on New Year's; family superstitions | December 28, 2025 |
| 512 | "Best of the Year (Part I)" | Locusta the Poisoner of Rome; Amelia Earhart | December 25, 2025 |
| Rewind | "Rewind with Karen & Georgia - Episode 76: My Own Sinkhole" | An episode 76 listening party | December 24, 2025 |
| Minisode | "Minisode 467" | near-death experience with the Ghost of Christmas Future; ornament-loving trash kid | December 22, 2025 |
| 511 | "They're All Pay" | Nancy Kerrigan and Tonya Harding | December 18, 2025 |
| Rewind | "Rewind with Karen & Georgia - Episode 75: Breakfast Wine" | An episode 75 listening party | December 17, 2025 |
| Minisode | "Minisode 466" | someone hiding in the ceiling; celebrity stopping by a family barbecue | December 15, 2025 |
| 510 | "We're So Real" | Santa scammer John Duval Gluck | December 11, 2025 |
| Rewind | "Rewind with Karen & Georgia - Episode 74: Jews Vs. Catholics" | An episode 74 listening party | December 10, 2025 |
| Minisode | "Minisode 465" | hitchhiking 12-year-old; Girl Scout field trip to visit a cult | December 8, 2025 |
| Special | "MFM Presents...Brief Recess" | Premiere episode of Brief Recess | December 5, 2025 |
| 509 | "Let Me Corrupt You" | Phoebe Handsjuk; SS Edmund Fitzgerald | December 4, 2025 |
| Rewind | "Rewind with Karen & Georgia - Episode 73: Chill Satanist" | An episode 73 listening party | December 3, 2025 |
| Minisode | "Minisode 464" | creepy caller; mistaken kidnapping in Sweden | December 1, 2025 |
| 508 | "Live at the Paramount Theatre (Oakland Night 2)" | Edith Irene Wolfskill; James Hogue | November 27, 2025 |
| Rewind | "Rewind with Karen & Georgia - Episode 72: Steven It Out" | An episode 72 listening party | November 26, 2025 |
| Minisode | "Minisode 463" | celebrity stopping by Thanksgiving dinner; grandma's kitchen | November 24, 2025 |
| 507 | "Adult Woman" | James Waybern Hall | November 20, 2025 |
| Rewind | "Rewind with Karen & Georgia - Episode 71: Put It In A Door" | An episode 71 listening party | November 19, 2025 |
| Minisode | "Minisode 462" | Golden State Killer; accidental curse | November 17, 2025 |
| 506 | "New York Favorites" | New York Zodiac Killer; Nellie Bly | November 13, 2025 |
| Rewind | "Rewind with Karen & Georgia - Episode 70: Live at the Moontower Comedy Festival" | An episode 70 listening party | November 12, 2025 |
| Minisode | "Minisode 461" | Hocus Pocus connection; drunk storm off | November 10, 2025 |
| 505 | "Brief Recess" | Brief Recess | November 6, 2025 |
| Rewind | "Rewind with Karen & Georgia - Episode 69: Never A Mannequin" | An episode 69 listening party | November 5, 2025 |
| Minisode | "Minisode 460" | Zodiac suspect; eerie psychic experience | November 3, 2025 |
| 504 | "Eyeball Territory" | Mary Shelley | October 30, 2025 |
| Rewind | "Rewind with Karen & Georgia - Episode 68: Q&T&A" | An episode 68 listening party | October 29, 2025 |
| Minisode | "Minisode 459" | giant pumpkin; pipe bomb party; tales from Spirit Halloween | October 27, 2025 |
| 503 | "Live at the Eccles Theater (Salt Lake City Night 2)" | Utah Monolith; Butch Cassidy and the Wild Bunch | October 23, 2025 |
| Rewind | "Rewind with Karen & Georgia - Episode 67: Live at the Egyptian Room" | An episode 67 listening party | October 22, 2025 |
| Minisode | "Minisode 458" | "or so we thought" stories | October 20, 2025 |
| Special | "MFM Presents...Hell in Heaven" | Premiere episode of Hell in Heaven | October 17, 2025 |
| 502 | "Washington Favorites" | Seattle cyanide poisonings; Barefoot Bandit | October 16, 2025 |
| Rewind | "Rewind with Karen & Georgia - Episode 66: The Devil's Number" | An episode 66 listening party | October 15, 2025 |
| Minisode | "Minisode 457" | an accidental kidnapping; a school drop-off mishap | October 13, 2025 |
| 501 | "Live at Bass Concert Hall (Austin Night 1)" | Kiss and Kill Murder; Texana forgeries | October 9, 2025 |
| Rewind | "Rewind with Karen & Georgia - Episode 65: Pre-Milked Cereal" | An episode 65 listening party | October 8, 2025 |
| Minisode | "Minisode 456" | shadow figures of Davis; An apartment squatter | October 6, 2025 |
| 500 | "Knot for Naught" | Lost Women of Highway 20; Hollywood Bling Ring | October 2, 2025 |
| Rewind | "Rewind with Karen & Georgia - Episode 64: Live at Revolution Hall" | An episode 64 listening party | October 1, 2025 |
| Minisode | "Minisode 455" | A hitman in the news; A latchkey kid's last stand | September 29, 2025 |
| 499 | "First Live Show in 6 Years!!" | murder of William Dickens; Killdozer | September 25, 2025 |
| Rewind | "Rewind with Karen & Georgia - Episode 63: Steven’s Tuxedo" | An episode 63 listening party | September 24, 2025 |
| Minisode | "Minisode 454" | A sorority stalker; Unhinged team-building questions | September 22, 2025 |
| 498 | "Tugboat Cat" | Forensic sculptor Frank Bender, co-founder of the Vidocq Society | September 18, 2025 |
| Rewind | "Rewind with Karen & Georgia - Episode 62: Trust Issues & Ice Skate Shoes" | An episode 62 listening party | September 17, 2025 |
| Minisode | "Minisode 453" | A vintage murder; An inspiring story about a public pool | September 15, 2025 |
| 497 | "Cigarettes and Mothballs" | The heroic passengers of United Flight 93 on September 11th | September 11, 2025 |
| Rewind | "Rewind with Karen & Georgia - Episode 61: Live at The Neptune" | An episode 61 listening party | September 10, 2025 |
| Minisode | "Minisode 452" | A horse camp run by drug dealers; A summer ghost story | September 8, 2025 |
| 496 | "Swim Angry" | The disappearance of Anne Marie Fahey; The story of heroic Armenian athlete Shavarsh Karapetyan | September 4, 2025 |
| Rewind | "Rewind with Karen & Georgia - Episode 60: Jazz It" | An episode 60 listening party | September 3, 2025 |
| Minisode | "Minisode 451" | Grandparent-themed hometowns | September 1, 2025 |
| 495 | "Colorado Favorites" | Cult leader Amy Carlson from December 23, 2021; Cold case murders of Barbara Oberholtzer and Annette Schnee from September 16, 2021 | August 28, 2025 |
| Rewind | "Rewind with Karen & Georgia - Episode 59:Live At The Wilbur" | An episode 59 listening party | August 27, 2025 |
| Minisode | "Minisode 450" | A trash uncle robbery; A Colin Farrell spotting | August 25, 2025 |
| 494 | "Did You Just Call Me Baby?" | Australia’s Wanda Beach Murders | August 21, 2025 |
| Rewind | "Rewind with Karen & Georgia - Episode 58: Some Quiet Sunday" | An episode 58 listening party | August 20, 2025 |
| Minisode | "Minisode 449" | An underground bourbon empire; A Victorian ghost-themed birthday party | August 18, 2025 |
| 493 | "Jazz Hands All Around" | The Osage oil murders | August 14, 2025 |
| Rewind | "Rewind with Karen & Georgia - Episode 57: Live at the Fox Theater in Oakland" | An episode 57 listening party | August 13, 2025 |
| Minisode | "Minisode 448" | A wolf in sheep’s clothing; A Jeffrey Epstein encounter | August 11, 2025 |
| Special | "My Favorite Murder Presents…Trust Me" | The premiere episode of Trust Me: Cults, Extreme Belief, and Manipulation, on the Exactly Right Network | August 8, 2025 |
| 492 | "It Will Be Filed" | The life and tragic death of Australian design legend Florence Broadhurst | August 7, 2025 |
| Rewind | "Rewind with Karen & Georgia - Episode 56: Service Poodle" | An episode 56 listening party | August 6, 2025 |
| Minisode | "Minisode 447" | A witness in a murder trial; A run-in with White Boy Rick at a car wash | August 4, 2025 |
| 491 | "Ye Olde 7-Eleven" | The story of castaway Philip Ashton | July 31, 2025 |
| Rewind | "Rewind with Karen & Georgia - Episode 55: Let’s Hear Your Podcast" | An episode 55 listening party | July 30, 2025 |
| Minisode | "Minisode 446" | Cult themed hometowns | July 28, 2025 |
| 490 | "Trust Me" | Karen and Georgia sit down with survivors Lola Blanc and Meagan Elizabeth, hosts of Exactly Right’s newest podcast Trust Me: Cults, Extreme Belief, and Manipulation | July 24, 2025 |
| Rewind | "Rewind with Karen & Georgia - Episode 54: Valet Area" | An episode 54 listening party | July 23, 2025 |
| Minisode | "Minisode 445" | A prison break; Therapy dogs | July 21, 2025 |
| 489 | "We Are Your Baby" | The kidnapping of John Paul Getty III; The Pappygate bourbon heist | July 17, 2025 |
| Rewind | "Rewind with Karen & Georgia - Episode 53: Live at the Orpheum" | An episode 53 listening party | July 16, 2025 |
| Minisode | "Minisode 444" | Grandma’s ashes; A wedding drama debate for the ages | July 14, 2025 |
| 488 | "It’s Finally Happening" | The murder spree of Charles Starkweather and Caril Fugate; The story of Iwao Hakamata, Japan’s longest-serving death row prisoner | July 10, 2025 |
| Rewind | "Rewind with Karen & Georgia - Episode 52: Bonjour, Internet!" | An episode 52 listening party | July 9, 2025 |
| Minisode | "Minisode 443" | A solved hometown cold case; A snake in the bathtub | July 7, 2025 |
| 487 | "As Will Be Mine" | Drug kingpin White Boy Rick; The story of “Queen of Sinking Ships” Violet Jessop | July 3, 2025 |
| Rewind | "Rewind with Karen & Georgia - Episode 51: A Bit of Oblivion" | An episode 51 listening party | July 2, 2025 |
| Minisode | "Minisode 442" | A near-death experience; Shitbag triplets | June 30, 2025 |
| 486 | "Take These From Me" | United Airlines Flight 232; The story of World War II hero dog Smoky | June 26, 2025 |
| Rewind | "Rewind with Karen & Georgia - Episode 50: The Golden Anniversary Episode" | An episode 50 listening party | June 25, 2025 |
| Minisode | "Minisode 441" | A hot dog day gone wrong; Anxiety-inducing parents | June 23, 2025 |
| Bonus–Episode | "Bonus Episode - Presented by Hyundai" | Georgia Gilmore and the Club From Nowhere; The story of the Rochambelles | June 20, 2025 |
| 485 | "One Unwashed Lettuce Leaf" | The story of heroic Civil War nurse, Lucy Nichols | June 19, 2025 |
| Rewind | "Rewind with Karen & Georgia - Episode 49: The great Guy Law-Time New Years Spectacular" | An episode 49 listening party | June 18, 2025 |
| Minisode | "Minisode 440" | Historical knowledge; An emu trying to pants grandma | June 16, 2025 |
| 484 | "A Copse of Trees" | The kidnapping and survival of Elizabeth Smart | June 12, 2025 |
| Rewind | "Rewind with Karen & Georgia - Episode 48: An Albert Fish Production" | An episode 48 listening party | June 11, 2025 |
| Minisode | "Minisode 439" | Trash dad fun times; A dachshund story | June 9, 2025 |
| 483 | "Those Pants, That Hand" | Harper Lee’s investigation into Reverend Willie Maxwell | June 5, 2025 |
| Rewind | "Rewind with Karen & Georgia - Episode 47: Live at the Bell House" | An episode 47 listening party | June 4, 2025 |
| Minisode | "Minisode 438" | A trash dad on safari; A Guy Fieri apology | June 2, 2025 |
| 482 | "Similar Different Problems" | Alamo Christian Foundation | May 29, 2025 |
| Minisode | "Minisode 437" | Latchkey kid survival story; Deadly snail allergy | May 26, 2025 |
| 481 | "$8 Million in Today’s Money" | Phoenix’s Serial Shooter; Flannan Isles Lighthouse Mystery | May 22, 2025 |
| Rewind | "Rewind with Karen & Georgia - Episode 46: Skippers Unite!" | An episode 46 listening party | May 21, 2025 |
| Minisode | "Minisode 436" | A mom destroying “evidence”; Hero Siamese cat named Rutherford | May 19, 2025 |
| 480 | "Listener Favorites" | Zoot Suit Riots from July 30, 2020; 1974 Ten Cent Beer Night from February 9, 2023 | May 15, 2025 |
| Rewind | "Rewind with Karen & Georgia - Episode 45: Funky Diva" | An episode 45 listening party | May 14, 2025 |
| Minisode | "Minisode 435" | Cara Knott legacy story; Real estate meeting with Robert Durst | May 12, 2025 |
| 479 | "No Bangs" | Apollo 13 mission | May 8, 2025 |
| Rewind | "Rewind with Karen & Georgia - Episode 44: Live from the Chicago Podcast Festival" | An episode 44 listening party | May 7, 2025 |
| Minisode | "Minisode 434" | Date with a murderer; Old-timey shootout | May 5, 2025 |
| 478 | "Briefcase Challenge" | The Teacup Poisoner; Maria Altmann’s fight to reclaim Gustav Klimt’s masterpiece, Adele I | May 1, 2025 |
| Rewind | "Rewind with Karen & Georgia - Episode 43: In Arrears" | An episode 43 listening party | April 30, 2025 |
| Minisode | "Minisode 433" | Grandma confronting an intruder; Shitbag sisters | April 28, 2025 |
| 477 | "The Greatest Depression" | Linda Riss and Burt Pugach; The Great Emu War | April 24, 2025 |
| Rewind | "Rewind with Karen & Georgia - Episode 42: Abject Failure" | An episode 42 listening party | April 23, 2025 |
| Minisode | "Minisode 432" | Titanic museum guest stories; Snail breeder dad | April 21, 2025 |
| 476 | "Sprinkles and Googly Eyes" | The Amistad trial; The dog crate prison break | April 17, 2025 |
| Rewind | "Rewind with Karen & Georgia - Episode 41: Live from EW Popfest" | An episode 41 listening party | April 16, 2025 |
| Minisode | "Minisode 431" | Near-death experience; Hot dog justice | April 14, 2025 |
| 475 | "My Favorite Firework" | The serial homicides in and around Toronto's Gay Village; Con artist Margaret Lydia Burton | April 10, 2025 |
| Rewind | "Rewind with Karen & Georgia - Episode 40: Squad Gourds" | An episode 40 listening party | April 9, 2025 |
| Minisode | "Minisode 430" | Pet-themed for National Pet Day; Hero calico cat; A dog with a big appetite for butter | April 7, 2025 |
| Special | "My Favorite Murder Presents...The Knife" | The premiere episode of The Knife: A True Crime Podcast, on the Exactly Right network. | April 4, 2025 |
| 474 | "It Cleans Ducks" | The murder of Cara Knott; The mysterious disappearance of Amelia Earhart | April 3, 2025 |
| Rewind | "Rewind with Karen & Georgia - Episode 39: Kind of Loco" | An episode 39 listening party | April 2, 2025 |
| Minisode | "Minisode 429" | April Fool's Day prank gone very right; A robber disguised as Groucho Marx | March 31, 2025 |
| 473 | "Parker Posey" | The murder of Lita McClinton; The Texas Seven prison escape | March 27, 2025 |
| Rewind | "Rewind with Karen & Georgia - Episode 38: Sidebar Nation" | An episode 38 listening party | March 26, 2025 |
| Minisode | "Minisode 428" | Pretending to be rich; A rangerino’s experience in Bear Brook | March 24, 2025 |
| 472 | "Give Me All My Words" | The Beauty Queen Killer; The Tipster | March 20, 2025 |
| Rewind | "Rewind with Karen & Georgia - Episode 37: Liminal Space" | An episode 37 listening party | March 19, 2025 |
| Minisode | "Minisode 427" | A St. Patrick’s Day prank; A Cone Parade in Richmond, Virginia | March 17, 2025 |
| 471 | "The Knife" | Guests Hannah Smith and Patia Eaton discuss true crime storytelling | March 13, 2025 |
| Rewind | "Rewind with Karen & Georgia - Episode 36: Live from LA Podcast Festival" | An episode 36 listening party | March 12, 2025 |
| Minisode | "Minisode 426" | Safe deposit box treasure; Riding on bumper boats | March 10, 2025 |
| 470 | "Accept No Dare" | The disappearance of John Darwin; Victorian-era activist Josephine Butler | March 6, 2025 |
| Rewind | "Rewind with Karen & Georgia - Episode 35: A Small Foreign Faction" | An episode 35 listening party | March 5, 2025 |
| Minisode | "Minisode 425" | A trash kid; Visiting a Jack the Ripper museum | March 3, 2025 |
| 469 | "Crochet Positive" | True crime charlatan Stéphane Bourgoin; The 1963 Great Train Robbery | February 27, 2025 |
| Rewind | "Rewind with Karen & Georgia - Episode 34: Thirty Let The Bodies Hit The Four" | An episode 34 listening party | February 26, 2025 |
| Minisode | "Minisode 424" | An MFM origin story; A petty family | February 24, 2025 |
| 468 | "Just Start Screaming" | The murder of Fahim Saleh; The 2005 Wendy’s severed finger panic | February 20, 2025 |
| Rewind | "Rewind with Karen & Georgia - Episode 33: What About Mimi?" | An episode 33 listening party | February 19, 2025 |
| Minisode | "Minisode 423" | Faking an injury; An important hometown festival | February 17, 2025 |
| 467 | "Nipper & the Hat" | The Kray twins; The Tenerife airport disaster | February 13, 2025 |
| Rewind | "Rewind with Karen & Georgia - Episode 32: Just the 32 of Us" | An episode 32 listening party | February 12, 2025 |
| Minisode | "Minisode 422" | Finding money on the ground; Attending a celebration for Aretha Franklin | February 10, 2025 |
| 466 | "Parrots of the Future" | The Adelaide Oval abductions; The Schoolhouse Blizzard of 1888 | February 6, 2025 |
| Rewind | "Rewind with Karen & Georgia - Episode 31: Namaste Sexy" | An episode 31 listening party | February 5, 2025 |
| Minisode | "Minisode 421" | Uncovering a family secret; Wedding drama | February 3, 2025 |
| 465 | "You're Kidding Yourself, Supt" | The Burning Bed murder; Locusta, Poisoner of Rome | January 30, 2025 |
| Rewind | "Rewind with Karen & Georgia - Episode 30: The F*ck Word Mystery Show" | An episode 30 listening party | January 29, 2025 |
| Minisode | "Minisode 420" | Being interviewed by the FBI; A secret password | January 27, 2025 |
| 464 | "Dear Movies, I Love You" | Conversation about movies with guests Millie De Chirico and Casey O'Brien | January 23, 2025 |
| Rewind | "Rewind with Karen & Georgia - Episode 29: Twenty-Nein" | An episode 29 listening party | January 22, 2025 |
| Minisode | "Minisode 419" | A canoe voyage; Finding a long-lost sibling | January 20, 2025 |
| 463 | "We Are Never Brief" | Irish courtesan Peg Plunkett | January 16, 2025 |
| Rewind | "Rewind with Karen & Georgia - Episode 28: I 28 His Liver With Some Fava Beans and A Nice Chianti" | An episode 28 listening party | January 15, 2025 |
| Minisode | "Minisode 418" | Hidden money; Going to happy hour as a kid | January 13, 2025 |
| 462 | "We Own This Table" | The murder of Carol Morgan; Michel Vaujour | January 9, 2025 |
| Rewind | "Rewind with Karen & Georgia - Episode 27: Your Hometown Murder Email Round-Up" | An episode 27 listening party | January 8, 2025 |
| Minisode | "Minisode 417" | A dog named Turbo; An annual Hot Dog Day | January 6, 2025 |
| 461 | "Heed This Advice" | The disappearance of Jodi Huisentruit | January 2, 2025 |
| Rewind | "Rewind with Karen & Georgia - Episode 26: Twenty Six Six Six" | An episode 26 listening party | January 1, 2025 |
| Minisode | "Minisode 416" | A childhood hobby; A petty solution to a problem | December 30, 2024 |
| 460 | "I Would Never Try" | Singer Mary Jones | December 26, 2024 |
| Rewind | "Rewind with Karen & Georgia - Episode 25: Twenty Knives" | An episode 25 listening party | December 25, 2024 |
| Minisode | "Minisode 415" | Trying to enjoy a picnic; Hanging out at a mall in the ‘80s | December 23, 2024 |
| 459 | "We're Both Skiing" | The death of Sandra Birchmore | December 19, 2024 |
| Rewind | "Rewind with Karen & Georgia - Episode 24: And Twenty Justice Four All" | An episode 24 listening party | December 18, 2024 |
| Minisode | "Minisode 414" | A bloody handprint; Debunking a local legend | December 16, 2024 |
| 458 | "The Demands Are Incredible" | The Superbike murders | December 12, 2024 |
| Rewind | "Rewind with Karen & Georgia - Episode 23: Making a Twenty-Thirderer" | An episode 23 listening party | December 11, 2024 |
| Minisode | "Minisode 413" | A secret tunnel; Kids playing with candles | December 9, 2024 |
| 457 | "In with the Goths" | The life and murder of Medgar Evers; Cliff Morrison and Ward 5B | December 5, 2024 |
| Rewind | "Rewind with Karen & Georgia - Episode 22: The Girls with the Episode 22" | An episode 22 listening party | December 4, 2024 |
| Minisode | "Minisode 412" | A self-reporting trash parent; Summer camp memories | December 2, 2024 |
| 456 | "True & Provable" | The murder of Jeanne Clery; The Cottingley Fairies | November 28, 2024 |
| Rewind | "Rewind with Karen & Georgia - Episode 21: Because 7 8 9" | An episode 21 listening party | November 27, 2024 |
| Minisode | "Minisode 411" | A hero dog named Beans; Sarcasm gone wrong | November 25, 2024 |
| 455 | "Time Math" | The disappearance of Adam Emery; The “Cardiff Giant” | November 21, 2024 |
| Rewind | "Rewind with Karen & Georgia - Episode 20: 20/20" | An episode 20 listening party | November 20, 2024 |
| Minisode | "Minisode 410" | Picking up a hitchhiker; The “Garbage Plate” | November 18, 2024 |
| 454 | "Together We're Fine" | Sarah Everard; The 1978 Lufthansa Heist | November 14, 2024 |
| Rewind | "Rewind with Karen & Georgia - Episode 19: Nineteen Kills and Counting" | An episode 19 listening party | November 13, 2024 |
| Minisode | "Minisode 409" | Surviving a shipwreck; A parade on Halloween | November 11, 2024 |
| 453 | "Shoulders Back" | The disappearance of Delimar Vera; John Snow and the Broad Street pump | November 7, 2024 |
| Rewind | "Rewind with Karen & Georgia - Episode 18: Investigateighteen Discovery" | An episode 18 listening party | November 6, 2024 |
| Minisode | "Minisode 408" | Getting lost in the woods; A vacation gone wrong | November 4, 2024 |
| 452 | "Morals & Morale" | The 1918 Hammond circus train wreck; The mystery of “The Watcher” | October 31, 2024 |
| Rewind | "Rewind with Karen & Georgia - Episode 17: Episode Se7enteen" | An episode 17 listening party | October 30, 2024 |
| Minisode | "Minisode 407" | A murder in Chicago; Creating a haunted house | October 28, 2024 |
| 451 | "We Must Please the Flight Attendants" | The trial of Pamela Smart; “Lawn Chair” Larry Walters | October 24, 2024 |
| Rewind | "Rewind with Karen & Georgia - Episode 16: Blood Murder Sixteen Magic" | An episode 16 listening party | October 23, 2024 |
| Minisode | "Minisode 406" | A glitch in the matrix; Lies from an older sister | October 21, 2024 |
| 450 | "Only Judgements" | The 1969 Altamont Free Concert | October 17, 2024 |
| Rewind | "Rewind with Karen & Georgia - Episode 15: Definitely Not Episode Sixteen" | An episode 15 listening party | October 16, 2024 |
| Minisode | "Minisode 405" | A safe deposit box; A ghost story from Halifax, Nova Scotia | October 14, 2024 |
| 449 | "We're All Human Beings" | The poisoning of Mary Yoder | October 10, 2024 |
| Rewind | "Rewind with Karen & Georgia - Episode 14: You Sexy Motherfourteen" | An episode 14 listening party | October 9, 2024 |
| Minisode | "Minisode 404" | A tricky dog; A haunted movie theater | October 7, 2024 |
| 448 | "Something to Strive For" | The 2015 Clinton Correctional prison escape | October 3, 2024 |
| Rewind | "Rewind with Karen & Georgia - Episode 13: Thirteen Going On Murdy" | An episode 13 listening party | October 2, 2024 |
| Minisode | "Minisode 403" | Working with a jeweler; Drinking with a trash aunt | September 30, 2024 |
| 447 | "I'm There With You Now" | Murder of Albert Snyder; 1985 SunValley Mall disaster | September 26, 2024 |
| Rewind | "Rewind with Karen & Georgia - Episode 12: Our Bodies, Our Twelves" | An episode 12 listening party | September 25, 2024 |
| Minisode | "Minisode 402" | ghost story from a local historian; grilled cheese and tomato soup festival | September 23, 2024 |
| 446 | "I'm Michael Caine" | serial killer cop Gerard John Schaefer; 2015 Hatton Garden Heist | September 19, 2024 |
| Rewind | "Rewind with Karen & Georgia - Episode 11: What the Helleven" | An episode 11 listening party | September 18, 2024 |
| Minisode | "Minisode 401" | neighborhood listserv; learning how to bartend | September 16, 2024 |
| 445 | "Little Notebook of wins" | serial killer Nannie Doss aka "The Giggling Granny"; Tami Oldham Ashcraft | September 12, 2024 |
| Rewind | "Rewind with Karen & Georgia - Episode 10: Murderous TENdencies" | An episode 10 listening party | September 11, 2024 |
| Minisode | "Minisode 400" | long-lost snacks; a forged birth certificate | September 9, 2024 |
| 444 | "Started in the Middle" | Murders of Sian O'Callaghan and Becky Godden-Edwards; Third Man Syndrome | September 5, 2024 |
| Rewind | "Rewind with Karen & Georgia - Episode 9: Color Me Nine" | An episode 9 listening party | September 4, 2024 |
| Minisode | "Minisode 399" | murder in Northern Kentucky; a grandma who hides treasure | September 2, 2024 |
| 443 | "All the Brave Podcasters" | Charles Crawford; The 1916 New Jersey shark attacks | August 29, 2024 |
| Rewind | "Rewind with Karen & Georgia - Episode 8: Eight Is Enough Murders" | An episode 8 listening party | August 28, 2024 |
| Minisode | "Minisode 398" | A badass grandma named Juanita; Sneaking into a parade procession | August 26, 2024 |
| 442 | "Above & Beyond" | The Montreal Massacre at École Polytechnique; How “Curb Your Enthusiasm” exonerated Juan Catalan | August 22, 2024 |
| Rewind | "Rewind with Karen & Georgia - Episode 7: Seven Murders in Heaven" | An episode 7 listening party | August 21, 2024 |
| Minisode | "Minisode 397" | A sunset shark attack; An eerie, old train car | August 19, 2024 |
| 441 | "Aim for the Basement" | Lisa Ziegert; The 2003 Antwerp Diamond Heist | August 15, 2024 |
| Rewind | "Rewind with Karen & Georgia - Episode 6: Stay Sixy" | An episode 6 listening party | August 14, 2024 |
| Minisode | "Minisode 396" | An awkward misunderstanding in Japan; A 10-year-old bank teller | August 12, 2024 |
| 440 | "Hands Behind Your Back" | Henrietta Lacks | August 8, 2024 |
| Rewind | "Rewind with Karen & Georgia - Episode 5: Five Favorite Murders" | An episode 5 listening party | August 7, 2024 |
| Minisode | "Minisode 395" | Driving stick shift; Listening to your survival instincts | August 5, 2024 |
| 439 | "Snap of a Bat" | 19th-century abortionist Madame Restell | August 1, 2024 |
| Rewind | "Rewind with Karen & Georgia - Episode 4: Go Forth and Murder" | An episode 4 listening party | July 31, 2024 |
| Minisode | "Minisode 394" | An escape from Broadmoor Hospital; A secret door in an attic | July 29, 2024 |
| 438 | "True Crime Sommelier" | The New York Zodiac Killer; The hijacking of Flight 855 | July 25, 2024 |
| Rewind | "Rewind with Karen & Georgia - Episode 3: Our Favorite Thirder" | An episode 3 listening party | July 24, 2024 |
| Minisode | "Minisode 393" | Pirate treasure; A working dog named Monty | July 22, 2024 |
| 437 | "Man on Man Energy" | Belle and Charles Cora; The Bradford Sweets Poisoning | July 18, 2024 |
| Rewind | "Rewind with Karen & Georgia - Episode 2: My Second Best Murder" | An episode 2 listening party | July 17, 2024 |
| Minisode | "Minisode 392" | Living next door to a serial killer; A scammer dad | July 15, 2024 |
| 436 | "You, Me & American Geography" | Sheriff Bufford Pusser; The 1917 Halifax Explosion | July 11, 2024 |
| Minisode | "Minisode 391" | Powdered chicken soup; Letting a 12-year-old drive | July 8, 2024 |
| 435 | "Ring Ring, Canada" | The wrongful conviction of Lamonte McIntyre; The Great Canadian Maple Syrup Heist | July 4, 2024 |
| Minisode | "Minisode 390" | Trapped in an elevator; A blimp ride | July 1, 2024 |
| 434 | "How Many Last Names Are There?" | Jennifer Bastian and Michella Welch | June 27, 2024 |
| Rewind | "Rewind with Karen & Georgia - Episode 1: My Firstest Murder" | Karen & Georgia listen to the first episode and add commentary about the podcast's beginnings | June 26, 2024 |
| Minisode | "Minisode 389" | Serving coffee to a serial killer; A whistle story | June 24, 2024 |
| 433 | "Deduction Junction" | Sir Arthur Conan Doyle; The Great Wyrley Outrages | June 20, 2024 |
| Minisode | "Minisode 388" | Road tripping with friends; Bartending on Halloween | June 17, 2024 |
| 432 | "Here's My Personality" | Arnold Schuster; Morris Blankenbaker and Glynn "Gabby" Moore | June 13, 2024 |
| Minisode | "Minisode 387" | Being petty in high school; A traumatic day at the beach | June 10, 2024 |
| 431 | "Let Me Explain Nothing" | George Dinning’s fight for justice; Aviator Frederick Valentich | June 6, 2024 |
| Minisode | "Minisode 386" | The I-70 Killer; A badass mom from Brooklyn | June 3, 2024 |
| 430 | "Here's Your Reward" | Curtis and Marjorie Chillingworth; Richard Dadd | May 30, 2024 |
| Minisode | "Minisode 385" | Breaking the rules in a museum; A photo of a ghost | May 27, 2024 |
| 429 | "Blobs & Goo" | Glenn Taylor Helzer and the Children of Thunder; The Oakville Blobs | May 23, 2024 |
| Minisode | "Minisode 384" | A murder of crows; Reckless golf cart driving | May 20, 2024 |
| 428 | "Flip That Board" | The New Bedford Highway Killer; The McDonald’s Monopoly scam | May 16, 2024 |
| Minisode | "Minisode 383" | A jury duty scam; A babysitting story from the '80s | May 13, 2024 |
| 427 | "Pineapples Stacked to the Sky" | Russell Williams; Frédéric Bourdin | May 9, 2024 |
| Minisode | "Minisode 382" | A traumatic roller coaster ride; Exploring the bottom of the ocean | May 6, 2024 |
| 426 | "Hell Never" | Donna Doll; The Hindenburg Disaster | May 2, 2024 |
| Minisode | "Minisode 381" | A convincing Halloween costume; A dog named Boone | April 29, 2024 |
| 425 | "A Fun Mind Experiment" | Carla Walker; The London Beer Flood of 1814 | April 25, 2024 |
| Minisode | "Minisode 380" | A sinkhole in Australia; A forgotten middle child | April 22, 2024 |
| 424 | "Audacity On Tap" | Stéphane Breitwieser | April 18, 2024 |
| Minisode | "Minisode 379" | A thrift store victory; Coffee with Ann Rule | April 15, 2024 |
| 423 | "Crack It!" | Carolands Estate Predator; Brian Regan, "The Spy Who Couldn't Spell" | April 11, 2024 |
| Minisode | "Minisode 378" | A murder in Mississippi; A make-believe softball team | April 8, 2024 |
| 422 | "I Wish You Hadn't Told Me That" | Sean Vincent Gillis; Kate Webster | April 4, 2024 |
| Minisode | "Minisode 377" | Bank robberies in Portugal; A missing child | April 1, 2024 |
| 421 | "The Wonderful World of Podcasting" | The 1945 Empire State Building plane crash; New York Assistant District Attorney Eunice Carter | March 28, 2024 |
| Minisode | "Minisode 376" | A diving survival story; A grandpa who was in the CIA | March 25, 2024 |
| 420 | "Sip of Drink" | Derrick Todd Lee; Jan Baalsrud | March 21, 2024 |
| Minisode | "Minisode 375" | A close encounter with a serial killer; A guide dog named Lola | March 18, 2024 |
| 419 | "The Butterfly King: A WWII Murder Mystery" | King Boris III, the Butterfly King | March 14, 2024 |
| Minisode | "Minisode 374" | A badass big sister; A ghost story from Australia | March 11, 2024 |
| 418 | "Assume It's a Masterpiece" | Vanessa Guillén; The 1911 theft of the Mona Lisa | March 7, 2024 |
| Minisode | "Minisode 373" | An FBI raid; Information from a Glensheen Mansion tour guide | March 4, 2024 |
| 417 | "A Nervous Nose" | The Crouch family murders; Thomas Samon | February 29, 2024 |
| Minisode | "Minisode 372" | Summer Jam ‘73; A naughty pony | February 26, 2024 |
| 416 | "Call You Next Week" | Bridget Cleary; The history of the Ponzi scheme | February 22, 2024 |
| Minisode | "Minisode 371" | A neighborhood bar story; A connection to Ann Rule | February 19, 2024 |
| 415 | "Be a Better You" | Chuck Morgan; WWII spy Virginia Hall | February 15, 2024 |
| Minisode | "Minisode 370" | A zoo cult; A dog named Mojo | February 12, 2024 |
| 414 | "Weather Influencers" | "The Insulin Killer"; Mother Mandelbaum | February 8, 2024 |
| Minisode | "Minisode 369" | '80s teaching techniques; A kind neighbor | February 5, 2024 |
| 413 | "Learned & Forgotten" | The Glensheen murders; Anthony Gignac | February 1, 2024 |
| Minisode | "Minisode 368" | A haunted farmhouse; Growing up near Broadmoor Hospital | January 29, 2024 |
| 412 | "Smooth as a Cucumber" | Billy Woodward; The sinking of the USS Indianapolis | January 25, 2024 |
| Minisode | "Minisode 367" | Twins' special connection; A legendary Canadian murder | January 22, 2024 |
| 411 | "8 Years, 1 Episode" | Tom Justice; The “Unsinkable” Margaret Brown | January 18, 2024 |
| Minisode | "Minisode 366" | An ancestor’s assassination; A ghost dog story | January 15, 2024 |
| 410 | "The Bossy One" | The 1931 Leavenworth Prison Break | January 11, 2024 |
| Minisode | "Minisode 365" | A night out in Tokyo; Why you should lock your doors | January 8, 2024 |
| 409 | "You Were Exactly Right" | Harvey Milk | January 4, 2024 |
| Minisode | "Minisode 364" | Finding traysure in the couch; Marriage proposal gone wrong | January 1, 2024 |
| 408 | "Turn It Forward" | The survival story of Franca Viola | December 28, 2023 |
| Minisode | "Minisode 363" | A grandma’s survival story; Working at a haunted mall | December 25, 2023 |
| 407 | "Skippers' Paradise" | Caylee and Casey Anthony | December 21, 2023 |
| Minisode | "Minisode 362" | Pizza night with coworkers; A family of thieves | December 18, 2023 |
| 406 | "My Husband's Lovely Wife" | The disappearance of Bonnie Bickwit and Mitchel Weiser; Marina Raskova and the Night Witches | December 14, 2023 |
| Minisode | "Minisode 361" | A haunted airplane; A dramatic dog named Lilly | December 11, 2023 |
| 405 | "Thanks, Smart People" | Vincent Chin; The 1990 Isabella Stewart Gardner Museum art heist | December 7, 2023 |
| Minisode | "Minisode 360" | Onion Pie Murder; Maine dad lore | December 4, 2023 |
| 404 | "How Does Gambling Work?" | Boxer Sonny Liston; Plastic surgeon Anthony Pignataro | November 30, 2023 |
| Minisode | "Minisode 359" | ‘80s Montreal meet cute; A lost cat named Felix | November 27, 2023 |
| 403 | "Thrive & Survive" | The 1982 Alpine Meadows Avalanche; William Chester Minor and the Oxford English Dictionary | November 23, 2023 |
| Minisode | "Minisode 358" | Pen-pals; A trash mom from the '90s | November 20, 2023 |
| 402 | "Staunch Women" | “Premonition Poisoner” Tillie Klimek; Claudette Colvin | November 16, 2023 |
| Minisode | "Minisode 357" | Driving a Zamboni at a spooky ice rink; Fortune-telling grandma | November 13, 2023 |
| 401 | "Keep a Lid On It" | Pioneering investigative reporter Nellie Bly | November 9, 2023 |
| Minisode | "Minisode 356" | Drunk parent story; Coolest babysitter of all time | November 6, 2023 |
| 400 | "It Just Keeps Happening: The 400th Episode" | Body snatching victim, Clara Loeper; Notorious con man, Victor Lustig | November 2, 2023 |
| Minisode | "Minisode 355" | Witch mom; Family lore heard at holiday dinners | October 30, 2023 |
| 399 | "A Jack Ruby Type" | Jewel thief Doris Payne | October 26, 2023 |
| Minisode | "Minisode 354" | A chill, cool ghost; Surviving an avalanche | October 23, 2023 |
| 398 | "Gloria and Colleen" | Felix Vail | October 19, 2023 |
| Minisode | "Minisode 353" | Creepy hotel story; A town that loves cheddar bay biscuits | October 16, 2023 |
| 397 | "Doers of Knowing" | Cult of the Great Eleven aka the Blackburn Cult | October 12, 2023 |
| Minisode | "Minisode 352" | Motel murder; Trash dad boating adventure | October 9, 2023 |
| 396 | "Good and Fine" | Sandra and John Jacobson; Mark Olmsted; HIV/AIDS epidemic | October 5, 2023 |
| Minisode | "Minisode 351" | Sneaker waves; Bigfoot museum | October 2, 2023 |
| 395 | "Your Mom Has a Headache" | Anne Boleyn | September 28, 2023 |
| Minisode | "Minisode 350" | Bowling alley babysitting; Accidental grave robbing | September 25, 2023 |
| 394 | "Shut the House Down" | "Mommy Doomsday," Lori Vallow Daybell | September 21, 2023 |
| Minisode | "Minisode 349" | Murder house for sale; Neighbor meet-cute | September 18, 2023 |
| 393 | "It's Not a Meeting" | Louise and William Thoresen III; Spring-Heeled Jack | September 14, 2023 |
| Minisode | "Minisode 348" | Kids playing with lizards; Vincent, the hero cat | September 11, 2023 |
| 392 | "Hollywood Phony" | The "Highway Killer"; The "Bodies" exhibits | September 7, 2023 |
| Minisode | "Minisode 347" | Kids playing with lizards; Vincent, the hero cat | September 4, 2023 |
| 391 | "Adult Hands and Adult Brain" | June and Jennifer Gibbons, "The Silent Twins"; Forrest Tucker | August 31, 2023 |
| Minisode | "Minisode 346" | A 12-year-old with a job; A coffee shop break-in | August 28, 2023 |
| 390 | "Cow Women" | Charity Hospital; Dell Burke and the Yellow Hotel brothel | August 24, 2023 |
| 389 | "Chill and Withhold" | Graeme Thorne; NYPD’s first female detective, Isabella Goodwin | August 17, 2023 |
| 388 | "Spill the Milk" | Barbara Finch; Suzanne Lyall | August 10, 2023 |
| 387 | "Cocaine Shark" | George Reeves; Glacier Nation Park's "Night of the Grizzlies" | August 3, 2023 |
| 386 | "FOMO is Ancient" | The Paper Bag Killer; The Dancing Plague of 1518 | July 27, 2023 |
| Minisode | "Minisode 341" | A maple bar king; A hippo on the loose | July 24, 2023 |
| 385 | "Ghosted! by Roz Hernandez" | Georgia and Karen are joined by Roz Hernandez, host of Exactly Right's newest podcast, Ghosted! by Roz Hernandez, premiering Monday, July 17th. | July 20, 2023 |
| Minisode | "Minisode 340" | A roller coaster PR stunt gone wrong; A love letter to Steve Zahn | July 17, 2023 |
| 384 | "This One's for Steven" | The overdose death of Billie Carleton; Leonarda Cianciulli, the "Soap-Maker of Correggio"; A special goodbye to Steven | July 13, 2023 |
| Minisode | "Minisode 339" | A dad who makes the best LSD; A miracle in Turkey | July 10, 2023 |
| 383 | "Why Pigeons?" | Balloonfest '86; The secret life of William Leslie Arnold | July 6, 2023 |
| Special | "My Favorite Murder Presents: Do You Need A Ride? - "S4 - Ep. 1 - Karen & Chris"" | The premiere episode of Do You Need A Ride? Season 4: "We'll Drive!" | July 5, 2023 |
| Minisode | "Minisode 338" | A competitive dad playing in a non-competitive soccer league; A town full of sinkholes | July 3, 2023 |
| 382 | "Under Underpants" | 1966 Lake Summit triple murders; The "Boy" Edward Jones | June 29, 2023 |
| Minisode | "Minisode 337" | A small town murder in Australia; A friendly theater ghost | June 26, 2023 |
| 381 | "Joein' It Up" | Murder of Rita Curran; Vladimir Komarov, a.k.a. "the man who fell from space" | June 22, 2023 |
| Minisode | "Minisode 336" | An '80s kid survival story; A field trip of horror | June 19, 2023 |
| 380 | "We Definitely Frenched" | Francesco D'Alessio's murder by fashion model Terry Broome; Murder of Marjorie Nugent | June 15, 2023 |
| Minisode | "Minisode 335" | A snake named Big Sid; A family tradition from Appalachia | June 12, 2023 |
| Special | "DUBBED: 221 - Symbolic Violins" | Rescue of Baby Jessica; Deaths of Sid Vicious and Nancy Spungen | June 8, 2023 |
| Minisode | "Minisode 334" | A coworker's secret past; Getting on the wrong tour bus | June 5, 2023 |
| Special | "DUBBED: 268 - All-Stars of 7th Grade" | The Poet of Wichita; The true story of the "Cocaine Bear" | June 1, 2023 |
| Minisode | "Minisode 333" | A wild first date; A shocking deathbed confession | May 29, 2023 |
| Special | "DUBBED: 104 - Garden Party" | Survivor story of ER nurse Susan Kuhnhausen; Order of the Solar Temple mass murders | May 25, 2023 |
| Minisode | "Minisode 332" | A terrifying roller coaster ride; A big fan of Stephen King | May 22, 2023 |
| 379 | "Alcoholic Pickle" | Chocolate Box murders of 1898; Murder of Dominick Ciscone during the New York City blackout of 1977 | May 18, 2023 |
| Minisode | "Minisode 331" | Listening to mediocre dude bands; The queen of a parent-teacher organization | May 15, 2023 |
| 378 | "Gloved Hand Gesture" | The Ouija Board inspired murder of Ernest Turley; Paul Ohtaki and the Internment of Japanese Americans | May 11, 2023 |
| Minisode | "Minisode 330" | A family jailbreak story; A Drunk Karen cameo | May 8, 2023 |
| 377 | "Couched In Love" | Pedro Rodrigues Filho, a.k.a. the "Brazilian Dexter"; Death of Alexander Pushkin | May 4, 2023 |
| Minisode | "Minisode 329" | Hiding cash around the house; A song about Mount St. Helens | May 1, 2023 |
| 376 | "That's a Good Bean!" | The Monster with 21 Faces and the Vending Machine Murders; Marvin Popcorn Sutton | April 27, 2023 |
| Minisode | "Minisode 328" | A brave dog named Skip; Working at a movie theater | April 24, 2023 |
| 375 | "Please Withhold" | Murder of Helen Bailey; The "reincarnated WWII pilot" James Leininger | April 20, 2023 |
| Minisode | "Minisode 327" | Volunteering for a police lineup; Helping your neighbors in a catastrophe | April 17, 2023 |
| 374 | "Emotional Money Booth" | Disappearance of Paula Jean Welden; Frances Glessner Lee, the "mother of modern forensic science" | April 13, 2023 |
| Minisode | "Minisode 326" | Kids learning about Bessie Coleman; A weed dealer who needs a favor | April 10, 2023 |
| 373 | "Do Your Honk" | Bay Area killer Iva Kroeger; Gary Gilmore, inspiration behind Nike's Just Do It campaign | April 6, 2023 |
| Minisode | "Minisode 325" | Jury duty for a notorious criminal's trial; An amnesia story | April 3, 2023 |
| 372 | "Math with Karen and Georgia" | Disappearance of Anthonette Cayedito; Phineas Gage | March 30, 2023 |
| Minisode | "Minisode 324" | Racing the garage door; A sibling redemption story | March 27, 2023 |
| 371 | "Upset at the Air" | Murders of Henry Dee and Charles Moore; Lead masks case | March 23, 2023 |
| Minisode | "Minisode 323" | A psychic kid named Maren; A hot dog story | March 20, 2023 |
| 370 | "Necessary Yelling" | "The Bandit Queen" Pearl Hart; 1980 eruption of Mount St. Helens survival story of Dave Crockett | March 16, 2023 |
| Minisode | "Minisode 322" | A mafia poodle; Teenagers in charge | March 13, 2023 |
| 369 | "Blizzard Hotline" | Mountain Meadows Massacre; Killing of Nicole van den Hurk | March 9, 2023 |
| Minisode | "Minisode 321" | An Olympic gold medal; Playing hide-and-seek | March 6, 2023 |
| 368 | "Sharp Elbows" | 2004 Napa Halloween murders of Adriane Insogna and Leslie Mazzara; Jacques Grelley and the 1955 Le Mans disaster | March 2, 2023 |
| Minisode | "Minisode 320" | Awkward conversation at a party; Sleep talking in a foreign language | February 27, 2023 |
| 367 | "High-Fives With Both Hands" | Missing persons case of Donald Boardman; The "Missing Boy of Somosierra," Juan Pedro Martínez Gómez | February 23, 2023 |
| Minisode | "Minisode 319" | Ghost cats; A friendly car thief | February 20, 2023 |
| 366 | "High-Pitched Goodbye" | The Mirabal sisters, heroes of the Dominican Republic; Cleveland's infamous 1974 Ten Cent Beer Night | February 16, 2023 |
| Minisode | "Minisode 318" | Finding traysure in a thrift store; A prank gone wrong | February 13, 2023 |
| 365 | "You Don't Ever Know" | Theodore Durrant, a.k.a. the "Demon of the Belfry"; Mary Celeste | February 9, 2023 |
| Minisode | "Minisode 317" | A special message from a Ouija Board; A hypocrite Grandma | February 6, 2023 |
| 364 | "The B-I" | William Herbert Wallace and the murder of his wife, Julia Wallace; Ma Barker | February 2, 2023 |
| Minisode | "Minisode 316" | Birthday celebrations with Lorraine Warren; A landfill meet cute | January 30, 2023 |
| 363 | "Landed in Marshmallows" | Harry Houdini; Disappearance of Brandon Swanson | January 26, 2023 |
| Minisode | "Minisode 315" | Kids who watch Jerry Springer; A sweet Siamese cat | January 23, 2023 |
| 362 | "A Generous Number of Apples" | Murder of Joseph Augustus Zarelli, the "Boy in the Box"; Cuba's first Olympic marathoner, Felix de la Caridad Carvajal | January 19, 2023 |
| Minisode | "Minisode 314" | Dumb criminals; A holy cleansing of a home | January 16, 2023 |
| 361 | "The Opportunist" | Karen and Georgia are joined by Hannah Smith, the host of the podcast The Opportunist, to tell the story of Sandra Anderson and her dog, Eagle | January 12, 2023 |
| Minisode | "Minisode 313" | An embarrassing nickname; Kicking down a door in an emergency | January 9, 2023 |
| 360 | "Inner Mother" | Rodney Marks | January 5, 2023 |
| Minisode | "Minisode 312" | A geode expert; Something hiding in a garage | January 2, 2023 |
| 359 | "We Wish You A Merry Criminal" | Karen and Georgia welcome back Phoebe Judge, host of Criminal (podcast), to tell the story of the Sodder children disappearance on Christmas Eve | December 29, 2022 |
| Minisode | "Minisode 311" | A neighbor who is in the mafia; Moving to the country | December 26, 2022 |
| 358 | "A Socially Awkward Person's Great Idea" | Michelle Knotek | December 22, 2022 |
| Minisode | "Minisode 310" | A dad's secret stash of traysure; Working in a haunted house | December 19, 2022 |
| 357 | "The Big Exhale" | Malaysia Airlines Flight 370 | December 15, 2022 |
| Minisode | "Minisode 309" | Relatives on the Titanic; A kid attending a murder trial | December 12, 2022 |
| 356 | "Tugboat of Life" | Rescue and survival of Harrison Okene | December 8, 2022 |
| Minisode | "Minisode 308" | A diabolical big sister; Shopping while on sleeping pills | December 5, 2022 |
| 355 | "Satanic Panic Attack" | Trial of Arne Cheyenne Johnson | December 1, 2022 |
| Special | "Wondery Presents: The Vanished" | Preview of The Vanished. | November 29, 2022 |
| Minisode | "Minisode 307" | A lighthearted ghost story; Inviting strangers to Thanksgiving dinner | November 28, 2022 |
| 354 | "Heist You Up" | Heather Tallchief and one of the largest Vegas heists in history | November 24, 2022 |
| Minisode | "MFM Minisode 306" | One of the worst babysitters; Going to a concert with your parents | November 21, 2022 |
| 353 | "I Said No Gifts!" | Bridger Winegar, host of the podcast I Said No Gifts!, discusses holiday gift giving with hosts Karen and Georgia | November 17, 2022 |
| Minisode | "MFM Minisode 305" | A spooky library story; Making pancakes from scratch | November 14, 2022 |
| 352 | "Serve The Children" | Gwen Shamblin Lara | November 10, 2022 |
| Minisode | "MFM Minisode 304" | Magical pine cones; Walking the plank | November 7, 2022 |
| 351 | "High-Five Halloween" | Great Famine of 1315-1317; History of the mummy trade | November 3, 2022 |
| Minisode | "MFM Minisode 303" | Hiking on Halloween; Cheating death | October 31, 2022 |
| 350 | "My Favorite Murdaugh" | Guests Mandy Matney and Liz Farrell, hosts of the Murdaugh Murders Podcast, chat with hosts Karen and Georgia | October 27, 2022 |
| Minisode | "MFM Minisode 302" | Waking up from a nap; Meeting Henry Winkler | October 24, 2022 |
| 349 | "A Bit of Stew" | Max Jacobson, a.k.a. "Dr. Feelgood" | October 20, 2022 |
| Minisode | "MFM Minisode 301" | Getting to know your bartender; Haunted porcelain dolls | October 17, 2022 |
| 348 | "Old Biscuit" | Survival story of the Titanic's baker, Charles Joughin | October 13, 2022 |
| Minisode | "MFM Minisode 300" | A hero dog named Captain; A letter from an '80s mom | October 10, 2022 |
| 347 | "Hello and Welcome, It's Billy Eichner" | Chat with star and co-writer of Bros (film), Billy Eichner | October 6, 2022 |
| Minisode | "MFM Minisode 299" | Fraudulent credit card charges; Whittling with a rusty knife | October 3, 2022 |
| 346 | "Fistful of Butter" | Robert Garrow; Aum Shinrikyo | September 29, 2022 |
| Minisode | "MFM Minisode 298" | An awkward misunderstanding; A hike in the snow | September 26, 2022 |
| 345 | "Congrats to Australia" | Murder of Carol Jenkins; Investigation surrounding the Ford Pinto | September 22, 2022 |
| Special | "MFM Presents: Buried Bones - "The Valet Did It?"" | Premiere episode of Buried Bones | September 21, 2022 |
| Minisode | "MFM Minisode 297" | Realistic bird calls; A cat named Muffins | September 19, 2022 |
| 344 | "Hypothetical Rearview Mirror" | Death of Marilyn Monroe; Survival story of Brazilian pilot Antonio Sena | September 1, 2022 |
| Minisode | "MFM Minisode 296" | A superglue mishap; An earthquake in Guatemala | September 12, 2022 |
| 343 | "This Is Buried Bones" | Guests Kate Winkler Dawson and Paul Holes, hosts of Exactly Right's newest podcast, Buried Bones, join hosts Karen and Georgia to cover the 1933 death of Allene Lamson | September 8, 2022 |
| Minisode | "MFM Minisode 295" | Fajita seasoning; Another dad named Marty | September 5, 2022 |
| 342 | "The Debras of the World" | Stuart Alexander (murderer), another "Sausage King"; Death Valley Germans | September 1, 2022 |
| Minisode | "MFM Minisode 294" | Working at UPS; A love story | August 29, 2022 |
| 341 | "If You Were Godzilla..." | Disappearance of Jennifer Dulos; Strip search phone call scam behind the film Compliance (film) | August 25, 2022 |
| Minisode | "MFM Minisode 293" | Abandoned safe deposit boxes; Neck tattoos | August 22, 2022 |
| 340 | "Catfish Your Friends" | Murder of Milly Dowler; Ervil LeBaron, the "Mormon Manson" | August 18, 2022 |
| Minisode | "MFM Minisode 292" | Pot brownies; A family mausoleum | August 15, 2022 |
| 339 | "Grab Your Chapstick" | 1989 Mount Asahidake SOS incident; 1964 Alaska earthquake | August 11, 2022 |
| Minisode | "MFM Minisode 291" | A driver's ed test; Kismet on a cruise ship | August 8, 2022 |
| 338 | "We Saw What You Did" | Guests Millie De Chirico and Danielle Henderson, hosts of I Saw What You Did, discuss Dog Day Afternoon with hosts Karen and Georgia | August 4, 2022 |
| Minisode | "MFM Minisode 290" | A music librarian; Finding skeletons in the woods | August 1, 2022 |
| 337 | "A Survival Story with Kara Robinson Chamberlain" | Guest Kara Robinson Chamberlain, survivor and activist, discusses with hosts Karen and Georgia | July 28, 2022 |
| Minisode | "MFM Minisode 289" | An F4 tornado; Heroic acrobats | July 25, 2022 |
| 336 | "The FBI with Jerri Williams" | Interview with former FBI special agent Jerri Williams | July 21, 2022 |
| Minisode | "MFM Minisode 288" | A spy at a Chippendales show; A snakebite | July 18, 2022 |
| 335 | "Black and Missing with Natalie and Derrica Wilson" | Guests Natalie and Derrica Wilson, founders of the Black and Missing Foundation, discuss with hosts Karen and Georgia | July 14, 2022 |
| Minisode | "MFM Minisode 287" | A tabby cat named Biscuit; A royal birthday card | July 11, 2022 |
| 334 | "2,000 Pounds of Soap" | The story of murderer Adolph Luetgert, Chicago's "Sausage King"; The mysterious disappearance of Laureen Rahn | July 7, 2022 |
| Minisode | "MFM Minisode 286" | A tattoo shop story; Secret beer tunnels | July 4, 2022 |
| 333 | "Spiritual Brag" | The mysterious disappearance of Jean Spangler; The story of Colton Harris Moore, the "Barefoot Bandit" | June 30, 2022 |
| Minisode | "MFM Minisode 285" | A first-person sinkhole experience; Multiple dizzy bats | June 27, 2022 |
| 332 | "I'm Phoebe Judge" | Guest Phoebe Judge tells the story of Northeast Airlines Flight 823 | June 23, 2022 |
| Minisode | "MFM Minisode 284" | A mom named Lorraine; Baby teeth | June 20, 2022 |
| 331 | "Hermetic Lifestyles" | Tri-State Tornado of 1925; the Buenos Aires bank heist of 2006 | June 16, 2022 |
| Minisode | "MFM Minisode 283" | Unattended kids at an amusement park; Mudlarking | June 13, 2022 |
| 330 | "The Thing About Keith Morrison" | Karen and Georgia are joined by correspondent and podcast host Keith Morrison | June 9, 2022 |
| Minisode | "MFM Minisode 282" | Crushed Doritos on pizza; Expired pepper spray | June 6, 2022 |
| 329 | "The Last Telephone Booth" | The murder of Lisa Kimmell and the Great Basin Serial Killer; "Sarah Lawrence dorm dad" Larry Ray | June 2, 2022 |
| Minisode | "MFM Minisode 281" | Sunday school with Jim Jones; A message to librarians | May 30, 2022 |
| 328 | "The Year is 2243" | The death of socialite Sunny von Bülow; Various stories of bodies found in chimneys | May 26, 2022 |
| Minisode | "MFM Minisode 280" | The importance of gun safety; A sister nicknamed "Satan" | May 23, 2022 |
| 327 | "Double Mylar" | The disappearance of the Yuba County Five; The Clydach murders | May 19, 2022 |
| Minisode | "MFM Minisode 279" | A cat-worshipping cult; An embarrassing mom story | May 16, 2022 |
| 326 | "Don't Ask Tig Notaro" | Tig Notaro of Don't Ask Tig tells her hometown story | May 12, 2022 |
| Minisode | "MFM Minisode 278" | Awful camp counselors; A glitch in the matrix | May 9, 2022 |
| 325 | "Major Awards" | Ron Jones and "The Third Wave" social experiment; The disappearance and death of Robert Thompson | May 5, 2022 |
| Minisode | "MFM Minisode 277" | Martini nights with grandma; A baby who saves the day | May 2, 2022 |
| 324 | "Hit That Mute Button" | The tragic disappearance of Kelsey Collins; The miraculous survival of Captain Tim Lancaster on British Airways Flight 5390 | April 28, 2022 |
| Minisode | "MFM Minisode 276" | A '50s sinkhole story; An extra helpful bank teller | April 25, 2022 |
| 323 | "Pills & Thrills" | "National Forest Serial Killer" Gary Michael Hilton; The mysterious disappearance of Judy Smith | April 21, 2022 |
| Minisode | "MFM Minisode 275" | High-level gaslighting; Some facts from a surgeon | April 18, 2022 |
| 322 | "Tenfold More Murder: Part 2" | Guest Kate Winkler Dawson continues the story of John Christie | April 14, 2022 |
| Minisode | "MFM Minisode 274" | A beach day in Barcelona; Applying for a job at Dollar Tree | April 11, 2022 |
| 321 | "Tenfold More Murder: Part 1" | Guest Kate Winkler Dawson tells the story of John Christie | April 7, 2022 |
| Minisode | "MFM Minisode 273" | Selling swords in a mall; A high school assembly gone wrong | April 4, 2022 |
| 320 | "Gurl, Slow Down" | "Grindr Killer" Stephen Port; Survival story of Joe Simpson and Simon Yates in the Peruvian Andes | March 31, 2022 |
| Minisode | "MFM Minisode 272" | A creepy whistler; Sibling rivalry | March 28, 2022 |
| 319 | "Horse Camp" | Cokeville Elementary School hostage crisis; Abduction of Kari Swenson | March 24, 2022 |
| Minisode | "MFM Minisode 271" | A nightmare neighbor; A kid drunk off of cough syrup | March 21, 2022 |
| 318 | "One Spiritual Moment" | Shooting of Nicholas Green; 1971 Nashville plane hijacking | March 17, 2022 |
| Minisode | "MFM Minisode 270" | A badass mom named Bernadette; A narrow-minded snitch | March 14, 2022 |
| 317 | "Hello and Welcome to Disgraceland" | Disgraceland podcast host Jake Brennan's hometown murder | March 10, 2022 |
| Minisode | "MFM Minisode 269" | An aunt who enjoys her alcohol; Clown parents | March 7, 2022 |
| 316 | "Circle of Malice" | Attempted murder of Mary Jo Buttafuoco; Box Lady of Benton County | March 3, 2022 |
| Minisode | "MFM Minisode 268" | A famous dad; A trip to Coney Island | February 28, 2022 |
| 315 | "Here Be Monsters!" | Gypsy Hill killings; Cruise ship survival story of Moss and Tracy Hills | February 24, 2022 |
| Minisode | "MFM Minisode 267" | Someone talking too much on a plane; A fun little bomb story | February 21, 2022 |
| 314 | "The Chip Away Method" | Hartford circus fire; Murders of Ashley Pond and Miranda Gaddis | February 17, 2022 |
| Minisode | "MFM Minisode 266" | An apocalypse farm job offer; A famous local rooster | February 14, 2022 |
| 313 | "This is Criminal" | Phoebe Judge tells the shocking story of Pearl Lusk and Olga Rocco | February 10, 2022 |
| Minisode | "MFM Minisode 265" | A friendly ghost named "Frienderick"; A VW bus converted into a death-mobile | February 7, 2022 |
| 312 | "Ad Infinitum" | Kidnapping of Jody Plauché; Life of Bessie Coleman | February 3, 2022 |
| Minisode | "MFM Minisode 264" | Discovering your home was once a crime scene; A child who learns an important life lesson | January 31, 2022 |
| 311 | "Challenge Practice" | Murder of Charles de Young; Locked-room murder of Greg Fleniken | January 27, 2022 |
| Minisode | "MFM Minisode 263" | A quickstop at Stonehenge after almost being murdered; A coroner who appreciates the circle of life | January 24, 2022 |
| 310 | "I Like Seagulls" | Attica Prison riot; Survival of José Salvador Alvarenga | January 20, 2022 |
| Minisode | "MFM Minisode 262" | A dad misjudging the mph; A badass grandma in a hostage situation | January 17, 2022 |
| 309 | "Not Counting Is the Key: The 6th Anniversary Special!" | Murder of Aundria Bowman; History of the insanity defense | January 13, 2022 |
| Minisode | "MFM Minisode 261" | A mom in panic mode; Bad lunch vibes | January 10, 2022 |
| 308 | "A Blur of Entertainment" | Blanche Monnier; Candy Mossler | January 6, 2022 |
| Minisode | "MFM Minisode 260" | A death row optometrist; A hike with dad gone wrong | January 3, 2022 |
| 307 | "Fun Cracker Reveal" | The Miracle in the Andes: Uruguayan Air Force Flight 571 crash; Celia Cooney, the Bobbed Haired Bandit | December 30, 2021 |
| Celebrity–Hometown | "Celebrity Hometowns with Megan Mullally" | With Megan Mullally | December 29, 2021 |
| Minisode | "MFM Minisode 259" | A gaggle of party betches; A meet cute on the side of the freeway | December 27, 2021 |
| 306 | "You Heard It Here Last" | Mysterious death of Blair Adams; Love Has Won cult leader, Amy Carlson | December 23, 2021 |
| Celebrity–Hometown | "Celebrity Hometowns with Nick Offerman" | With Nick Offerman | December 22, 2021 |
| Minisode | "MFM Minisode 258" | A new unit of measurement; A rabid beaver | December 20, 2021 |
| 305 | "You Heard It Here Last" | Murder of Amanda Milan; Toronto Circus Riot of 1855 | December 16, 2021 |
| Celebrity–Hometown | "Celebrity Hometowns with Phoebe Bridgers" | With Phoebe Bridgers | December 15, 2021 |
| Minisode | "MFM Minisode 257" | An irresponsible ancestor; Disgraced creamed corn | December 13, 2021 |
| 304 | "Show-Off Time" | Life and death of Aaliyah; Survival story of Mauro Prosperi | December 9, 2021 |
| Celebrity–Hometown | "Celebrity Hometowns with Nicole Byer" | With Nicole Byer | December 8, 2021 |
| Minisode | "MFM Minisode 256" | Flipping off Richard Ramirez; A 5-year-old who knows how to use a lighter | December 6, 2021 |
| 303 | "The Lansburys & The Greystones" | The deadly green arsenic dresses of Victorian England; Murder of Kaitlyn Arquette | December 2, 2021 |
| Celebrity–Hometown | "Celebrity Hometowns with Margaret Cho" | With Margaret Cho | December 1, 2021 |
| Minisode | "MFM Minisode 255" | A trip to Vegas with grandma; A scary Billy Idol look-alike | November 29, 2021 |
| 302 | "Whistles & Flags" | Havana syndrome; Murder of Martha Brailsford | November 25, 2021 |
| Celebrity–Hometown | "Celebrity Hometowns with Wanda Sykes" | With Wanda Sykes | November 24, 2021 |
| Minisode | "MFM Minisode 254" | A crime scene with a chalk outline; A pre-teen hero | November 22, 2021 |
| 301 | "A Place For Moms" | Survival story of Paul Martin Andrews; Murder of E.C. Mullendore III | November 18, 2021 |
| Celebrity–Hometown | "Celebrity Hometowns with Patton Oswalt" | With Patton Oswalt | November 17, 2021 |
| Minisode | "MFM Minisode 253" | Sleeping through an emergency; A mysterious coffee shop regular | November 15, 2021 |
| 300 | "The 300th Episode!" | Patty Stallings; The Chippendales murder | November 11, 2021 |
| Celebrity–Hometown | "Celebrity Hometowns with Paul Holes" | With Paul Holes | November 10, 2021 |
| Minisode | "MFM Minisode 252" | A mafia murder story; A badass warrior queen | November 8, 2021 |
| 299 | "London & England" | Dennis Nilsen; Detective Jack Whicher and the Road Hill House murder | November 4, 2021 |
| Celebrity–Hometown | "Celebrity Hometowns with Michelle Buteau" | With Michelle Buteau | November 3, 2021 |
| Minisode | "MFM Minisode 251" | A scary audio file; A Zodiac Killer connection | November 1, 2021 |
| 298 | "Feelings In Real Time" | Death of Edgar Allan Poe; Cyntoia Brown | October 28, 2021 |
| Celebrity–Hometown | "Celebrity Hometowns with Josh Mankiewicz" | With Josh Mankiewicz | October 27, 2021 |
| Minisode | "MFM Minisode 250" | A Spooky Halloween ghost story; A celebrity hitchhiker | October 25, 2021 |
| 297 | "Lick the Difference!" | Murders of Rhonda Johnson and Sharon Shaw; History of the Miranda rights | October 21, 2021 |
| Minisode | "MFM Minisode 249" | An Alaskan cruise ship murder; A Liberian champagne punch recipe | October 18, 2021 |
| 296 | "Stakeouts & Ballons" | Unsolved cases of Kiana Klomp, Amber Tuccaro and Ella Mae Begay; Disappearance of Lawrence Joseph Bader | October 14, 2021 |
| Minisode | "MFM Minisode 248" | Using a meat tenderizer as self-defense; Trusting a stranger with your brand-new tv | October 11, 2021 |
| 295 | "Twenty-Two To Go" | Hinterkaifeck murders; History of the lie detector | October 7, 2021 |
| Minisode | "MFM Minisode 247" | Mom full of Mountain Dew; Country music at the beach | October 4, 2021 |
| 294 | "Was It A Sandwich?" | Hillsborough disaster; Lindow Woman bog body | September 30, 2021 |
| Minisode | "MFM Minisode 246" | IHOP excitement; "The wine I like" | September 27, 2021 |
| 293 | "Did We Forget Canada?" | Rosewood Massacre; Oliver "Billy" Sipple | September 23, 2021 |
| Minisode | "MFM Minisode 245" | An immortal nun; Meals of filet mignon and vodka | September 20, 2021 |
| 292 | "All Coffee & Apple Pie" | Cold case murders of Barbara Oberholtzer and Annette Schnee; Mysterious disappearance of the Candy Lady, Helen Brach | September 16, 2021 |
| Minisode | "MFM Minisode 244" | Traysure hidden in pockets; A lesson in pretending to be a New Yorker | September 13, 2021 |
| 291 | "Welcome to the Comfort Zone" | Murders committed by Ed Buck; Drowning victim recovery experts Gene and Sandy Ralston | September 9, 2021 |
| Minisode | "MFM Minisode 243" | A mistaken mini fridge; The invention of Minty Water | September 6, 2021 |
| 290 | "Full Metal Recovery" | Nazi resistance fighter Irena Sendler; Welsh crate man Brian Robson | September 2, 2021 |
| Minisode | "MFM Minisode 242 - F**king Hoorays" | Compilation of f***king hoorays | August 30, 2021 |
| 289 | "MFM Guest Host Picks #12: Nick Terry" | Stories of people buried alive; Mothman legend and Silver Bridge collapse | August 26, 2021 |
| Minisode | "MFM Minisode 241 - Neighborhood stories" | Neighborhood hometown stories | August 23, 2021 |
| 288 | "MFM Guest Host Picks #11: Erin & Erin" | Survival of Jennifer Morey; Death of Mitrice Richardson | August 19, 2021 |
| Minisode | "MFM Minisode 240 - Do We Have Time For A Hometown?" | Hometown stories told at live shows | August 16, 2021 |
| 287 | "MFM Guest Host Picks #10: Kate Winkler Dawson" | Murder of Irene Garza; Fred and Rosemary West | August 12, 2021 |
| Minisode | "MFM Minisode 239 - The Survivors: Part II" | Hometowns that feature survival stories | August 9, 2021 |
| 286 | "MFM Guest Host Picks #9: Bridger Winegar" | Mark Hofmann; The Sleepwalking Murderer | August 5, 2021 |
| Minisode | "MFM Minisode 238 - Attempted Kidnappings" | Hometown stories about attempted kidnappings | August 2, 2021 |
| 285 | "MFM Guest Host Picks #8: Kyle Russell (kikiwithkiki)" | Amityville Horror Murders; Lindbergh Baby Kidnapping | July 29, 2021 |
| Minisode | "Minisode 237 - The Worst" | Hometown stories about famous killers | July 26, 2021 |
| 284 | "MFM Guest Host Picks #7: Kara Klenk" | Paul Bernardo and Karla Homolka; Joseph Edward Duncan | July 22, 2021 |
| Minisode | "Minisode 236 - Badass Parents" | Stories about badass parents | July 19, 2021 |
| 283 | "MFM Guest Host Picks #6: Danielle Henderson" | Who put Bella in the Wych Elm?; John Bingham, 7th Earl of Lucan | July 15, 2021 |
| Minisode | "Minisode 235 - Let's Get Medical" | Stories about the dark side of medicine | July 12, 2021 |
| 282 | "MFM Guest Host Picks #5: Scotty Landes" | Oakland County Child Killer; Murder of Martha Moxley | July 8, 2021 |
| Minisode | "Minisode 234 - Ghost Stories: Part II" | Stories about ghosts | July 5, 2021 |
| 281 | "MFM Guest Host Picks #4: Brandie Posey" | Fort Worth Missing Trio; John Wayne Gacy | July 1, 2021 |
| Minisode | "Minisode 233 - The Great Outdoors" | Forest, woods, and summer camp stories | June 28, 2021 |
| 280 | "MFM Guest Host Picks #3: Billy Jensen" | Dexter Copycat Killer; Murder of Bonnie Lee Bakley | June 24, 2021 |
| Minisode | "Minisode 232 - Almost Joined A Cult" | Cult-related stories | June 21, 2021 |
| 279 | "MFM Guest Host Picks #2: Elizabeth Taylor" | Tulsa Race Massacre; Murder of Angie Dodge | June 17, 2021 |
| Minisode | "Minisode 231 - Natural Disasters" | Natural disasters | June 14, 2021 |
| 278 | "MFM Guest Host Picks #1: Steven Ray Morris" | Selena; Lady of the Dunes | June 10, 2021 |
| Minisode | "Minisode 230" | Secret siblings; A Son of Sam connection | June 7, 2021 |
| 277 | "Live at the Fox Theatre in Detroit, MI (2018)" | Rattle Run Church murder; Murder of Tina Biggar | June 3, 2021 |
| Minisode | "Minisode 229 - The First Responders" | First responder, EMT, and nurse stories | May 31, 2021 |
| 276 | "Live at Vicar Street in Dublin (2018)" | Colin Howell; Catherine Nevin | May 27, 2021 |
| Minisode | "Minisode 228" | A fruit-stealing axe murderer; A body in a freezer | May 24, 2021 |
| 275 | "Raise the Snail: Steven's 5th Anniversary!" | Real life Lord of the Flies | May 20, 2021 |
| Minisode | "Minisode 227" | A creepy neighbor story; A haunted university | May 17, 2021 |
| 274 | "Arrested Behavior" | Murder of Laci Peterson | May 13, 2021 |
| Minisode | "Minisode 226" | A criminal-chasing mom; A postal worker hero | May 10, 2021 |
| 273 | "Live at the Arlene Schnitzer Concert Hall in Portland (2018)" | Christian Longo; KOIN Tower hostage situation | May 6, 2021 |
| Minisode | "Minisode 225" | A dartboard; A Marty story | May 3, 2021 |
| 272 | "BYOF" | The Beast of Birkenshaw; D.B. Cooper | April 29, 2021 |
| Minisode | "Minisode 224" | A mace story; A pen-based murder | April 26, 2021 |
| 271 | "4 Hours of Sacred Pausing" | Sophie Scholl and the White Rose youth resistance; Survival story of Ada Blackjack | April 22, 2021 |
| Minisode | "Minisode 223" | A John Wayne Gacy connection; An exploding film story | April 19, 2021 |
| 270 | "Three Out Of Ten" | Brides in the bath murders; Pam Hupp | April 15, 2021 |
| Minisode | "Minisode 222" | A Richard Ramirez story; An earthquake tale | April 12, 2021 |
| 269 | "Big Hot C'mon" | Spontaneous human combustion; Paris Is Burning murders | April 8, 2021 |
| Minisode | "Minisode 221" | An explosion story; A school murder | April 5, 2021 |
| 268 | "All-Stars of 7th Grade" | The Poet of Wichita; The true story of the "Cocaine Bear" | April 1, 2021 |
| Minisode | "Minisode 220" | A nudist colony; A bathroom mirror design update | March 29, 2021 |
| 267 | "Leg Show" | Adolphus Hotel ghosts; Bunny Man legend | March 25, 2021 |
| Minisode | "Minisode 219" | A home intruder; An animal rescue story | March 22, 2021 |
| 266 | "Rave After Rave" | Murder of Ruthie Mae McCoy; Life of Detective Jacklean Davis | March 18, 2021 |
| Minisode | "Minisode 218" | Flour fire stories; Funeral home tales | March 15, 2021 |
| 265 | "The Answer's Salt" | Survivor story of Theresa Saldana | March 11, 2021 |
| Minisode | "Minisode 217" | Gravestone report; Photo lab secrets | March 8, 2021 |
| 264 | "Goodbye, Sloppy Joe!" | Murders at White House Farm | March 4, 2021 |
| Minisode | "Minisode 216" | Grandpa stories; Games with a serial killer | March 1, 2021 |
| 263 | "Let Me Challenge You" | Brown's Chicken Massacre; Peggy Jo Tallas | February 25, 2021 |
| Minisode | "Minisode 215" | A local Canadian murder; A badass survivor story | February 22, 2021 |
| 262 | "Live at the Civic Theatre in San Diego, CA (2019)" | San Diego Tank Rampage; Murder of Don Hardin | February 18, 2021 |
| Minisode | "MFM Minisode 214" | A creepy neighbor story; A bomb scare | February 15, 2021 |
| 261 | "What's Cookin'?" | Life of Eugene Bullard | February 11, 2021 |
| Minisode | "MFM Minisode 213" | A near-death experience in a bounce house; Another Lizzie Borden connection | February 8, 2021 |
| 260 | "Unwashed & Unabashed" | Murder of Lana Clarkson | February 4, 2021 |
| Minisode | "MFM Minisode 212" | Farm stories; A murder out West | February 1, 2021 |
| 259 | "Fake Snow in Glendale" | History of lobotomies; Smuttynose Axe Murders | January 28, 2021 |
| Minisode | "MFM Minisode 211" | A Lizzie Borden connection; A trucker story | January 25, 2021 |
| 258 | "Abject Failure (2016)" | Re-edit and re-upload of Episode 42 | January 21, 2021 |
| Minisode | "MFM Minisode 210" | A family suspect; A dangerous neighbor | January 18, 2021 |
| 257 | "Monster Machine" | Revenge of Miriam Rodríguez Martínez; Happy Face Killer | January 14, 2021 |
| Minisode | "MFM Minisode 209" | A survivor story; A close call | January 11, 2021 |
| 256 | "Live at The Fillmore in Detroit, MI (2017)" | Death of Robin Boes; Lowell Amos | January 7, 2021 |
| Minisode | "MFM Minisode 208" | A killer photographer; A Christmas Eve Robbery | January 4, 2021 |
| 255 | "Live at the Chevalier Theater in Medford, MA - Late Show (2018)" | Lizzie Borden; Eastern Air Lines Shuttle Flight 1320 | December 31, 2020 |
| Minisode | "MFM Minisode 207" | Scary sounds; The United States' first recorded murder | December 28, 2020 |
| 254 | "Little Bandit & Pirate George" | Death of Lori Ann Auker; The Donner Party | December 24, 2020 |
| Minisode | "MFM Minisode 206 - The Pet Heroes" | Hometowns that feature pet hero stories | December 21, 2020 |
| 253 | "Live at the Arvest Bank Theatre in Kansas City (2017)" | Death of Bethany Deaton; Ray and Faye Copeland | December 17, 2020 |
| Minisode | "MFM Minisode 205 - The Survivors" | Hometowns that feature survivor stories | December 14, 2020 |
| 252 | "The Great La-Z-Boy Uprising: Advice Q&A" | Karen and Georgia lend their amateur advice to your low-stakes problems | December 10, 2020 |
| Minisode | "MFM Minisode 204: Live From the Fan Cult" | Karen and Georgia read hometowns and answer questions from the Fan Cult | December 7, 2020 |
| 251 | "One Vince Away" | Saskatoon freezing deaths | December 3, 2020 |
| Minisode | "MFM Minisode 203" | Family secrets; A neighborhood predator | November 30, 2020 |
| 250 | "Look Who's Crossing" | Murder of Sherri Rasmussen | November 26, 2020 |
| Minisode | "MFM Minisode 202" | A sinkhole story; An Australian grandfather | November 23, 2020 |
| 249 | "Clear of Debris" | Lavinia Fisher; Byron David Smith | November 19, 2020 |
| Minisode | "MFM Minisode 201" | Catching a serial killer; A family stabbing | November 16, 2020 |
| 248 | "Congratulations, Smarty" | Survival story of Kara Robinson Chamberlain; 2010 University of Alabama in Huntsville shooting | November 12, 2020 |
| Minisode | "MFM Minisode 200" | A hotel robbery; Secrets in Nebraska | November 9, 2020 |
| 247 | "Champions In Our Own Ways" | Mary Vincent, a would-be victim of Lawrence Singleton; Typhoid Mary | November 5, 2020 |
| Minisode | "MFM Minisode 199" | A family massacre; A cult murder | November 2, 2020 |
| 246 | "thanks for the lolz" | 16th Street Baptist Church bombing; The California Witch Killers Michael Bear Carson and Suzan Carson | October 29, 2020 |
| Minisode | "MFM Minisode 198" | Funeral home life; An interview with a mobster | October 26, 2020 |
| 245 | "Time Is Becoming A Serious Problem" | The Pied Piper of Tucson Charles Schmid | October 22, 2020 |
| Minisode | "MFM Minisode 197" | Witch trials; Halloween stories | October 19, 2020 |
| 244 | "Be Nostalgic for Old Problems" | Claremont serial killings | October 15, 2020 |
| Minisode | "MFM Minisode 196" | A creepy neighbor; A murder in the woods | October 12, 2020 |
| 243 | "New Escape Rooms" | I-5 Killer Randall Woodfield; Murder of Carol Thompson | October 8, 2020 |
| Minisode | "MFM Minisode 195" | A killer pastor; An airplane pervert | October 5, 2020 |
| 242 | "Spoilerama" | Murder of Adam Walsh and aftermath of the case | October 1, 2020 |
| Minisode | "MFM Minisode 194" | A serial killer connection; A phone pervert | September 28, 2020 |
| 241 | "A Deep Pause" | Élan School; Murder of Martha Moxley | September 24, 2020 |
| Minisode | "MFM Minisode 193" | A family murder mystery; A water park rescue | September 21, 2020 |
| 240 | "Flapper Bob" | Coney Island deaths; Andrew Cunanan | September 17, 2020 |
| Minisode | "MFM Minisode 192" | A postal worker hero; A family curse | September 14, 2020 |
| 239 | "Expert Conversation: David Rudolf & Sonya Pfeiffer" | Karen & Georgia chat with defense attorneys David Rudolf and Sonya Pfeiffer about The Staircase and their new podcast, Abuse of Power | September 10, 2020 |
| Minisode | "MFM Minisode 191" | A nun story; A serial killer connection | September 7, 2020 |
| 238 | "Lady Suit" | Ayahuasca Murders; Beast of Gévaudan | September 3, 2020 |
| Minisode | "MFM Minisode 190" | A badass survivor story; A Richard Ramirez connection | August 31, 2020 |
| 237 | "Anti-Hype Man" | Patty Cannon; Unsolved murder of Alberta Odell Jones | August 27, 2020 |
| Minisode | "MFM Minisode 189" | A John Dillinger story; A mother murder | August 24, 2020 |
| 236 | "Like A Quilt" | Old Exchange & Provost Dungeon; § Legend of Stull Cemetery | August 20, 2020 |
| Minisode | "MFM Minisode 188" | A Grim Sleeper connection; A nursing home connection | August 17, 2020 |
| 235 | "Mr. ZIP" | Robert Spangler; Delphi murders | August 13, 2020 |
| Minisode | "MFM Minisode 187" | A murder saw; Kentucky meat shower | August 10, 2020 |
| 234 | "Diane Steele: The Q&A" | Karen and Georgia answer summertime questions in quarantine | August 6, 2020 |
| Minisode | "MFM Minisode 186" | A mysterious murder; A paranormal rescue story | August 3, 2020 |
| 233 | "Free Range Children" | Zoot Suit Riots; 1976 Chowchilla bus kidnapping | July 30, 2020 |
| Minisode | "MFM Minisode 185" | A body in a motel; A family folklore correction corner | July 27, 2020 |
| 232 | "Live at the De Meervaart in Amsterdam (2018)" | Willem van Eijk; Elsje Christiaens | July 23, 2020 |
| Minisode | "MFM Minisode 184" | A murder trial; Poisonous rain | July 20, 2020 |
| 231 | "Small Bigfoot" | Murder of James R. Jordan Sr. | July 16, 2020 |
| Minisode | "MFM Minisode 183" | A flash flood; An Ed Gein connection | July 13, 2020 |
| 230 | "The Tide Pools of Your Life" | The Grim Sleeper | July 9, 2020 |
| Minisode | "MFM Minisode 182" | A death on a plane; A ghost town (on fire) | July 6, 2020 |
| 229 | "Live at the Arlene Schnitzer Concert Hall in Portland (2018)" | Murders of Larry Peyton and Beverly Allan; Edmund Creffield and the Brides of Christ Church | July 2, 2020 |
| Minisode | "MFM Minisode 181" | An unsolved murder; An underwater ghost town | June 29, 2020 |
| 228 | "The Season of the Abyss" | St. Francis Dam Disaster; Kidnapping of Elizabeth Shoaf | June 25, 2020 |
| Minisode | "MFM Minisode 180" | Cowee Tunnel disaster; A body in the back seat | June 22, 2020 |
| 227 | "Live at the Belk Theater in Charlotte (2018)" | Marcus Shrader; Blanche Taylor Moore | June 18, 2020 |
| Minisode | "MFM Minisode 179" | A near miss; A kid with a machete | June 15, 2020 |
| 226 | "50 Hour Days" | Hart family murder-suicide; Murder of Stephen Lawrence | June 11, 2020 |
| Minisode | "MFM Minisode 178" | A trapped underground story; Another local pervert | June 8, 2020 |
| 225 | "It's Jenga" | Life of Ida B. Wells; Stonewall Uprising | June 4, 2020 |
| Minisode | "MFM Minisode 177" | A sinkhole murder; A local pervert | June 1, 2020 |
| 224 | "What's In Your Pants?" | Angel Makers of Nagyrév; Hans Schmidt (priest) | May 28, 2020 |
| Minisode | "MFM Minisode 176" | A body in a canal; A bank robber's jacket | May 25, 2020 |
| 223 | "Live at the Paramount Theatre in Oakland (2018)" | Zodiac Killer suspects; Murder of Stephanie Bryan | May 21, 2020 |
| Minisode | "MFM Minisode 175" | A restaurant-themed murder; A stalker story | May 18, 2020 |
| 222 | "That's How Water Works" | Murder of Madelyn Murray O'Hair; Survival story of Juliane Koepcke | May 14, 2020 |
| Minisode | "MFM Minisode 174" | A message in a bottle; A vigilante mom | May 11, 2020 |
| 221 | "Symbolic Violins" | Rescue of Baby Jessica; Deaths of Sid Vicious and Nancy Spungen | May 7, 2020 |
| Minisode | "MFM minisode 173" | A lightbulb burglar; The first cyberstalking murder | May 4, 2020 |
| 220 | "Live at the Chevalier Theatre in Medford, MA (2018)" | Murder of Mary-Lou Arruda; Great Boston Fire of 1872 | April 30, 2020 |
| Minisode | "MFM Minisode 172" | A Kent State connection; A porch mystery | April 27, 2020 |
| 219 | "Small Pillow To Scream In" | Pacific Southwest Airlines Flight 1771; Kent State Massacre | April 23, 2020 |
| Minisode | "MFM Minisode 171" | A woman with a sword; Self-defense with canned food | April 20, 2020 |
| 218 | "Good Shabbos" | Murder of Yara Gambirasio; Crimes of Herb Coddington | April 16, 2020 |
| Minisode | "MFM Minisode 170" | A family fairytale; An encounter in the forest | April 13, 2020 |
| 217 | "Live at the Cobb Energy Performing Arts Centre in Atlanta (2018)" | Curse of Lake Lanier; Anjette Donovan Lyles | April 9, 2020 |
| Minisode | "MFM Minisode 169" | A wedding day murder; A city conspiracy | April 6, 2020 |
| 216 | "Robe Convention" | Death of Grace Kelly; Death of Kendrick Johnson | April 2, 2020 |
| Minisode | "MFM Minisode 168" | A badass aunt; a Canadian murder | March 30, 2020 |
| 215 | "Three Small Hot Dogs" | Death of Natalie Wood; The Boxcar Killer | March 26, 2020 |
| Minisode | "MFM Minisode 167" | Serial killers; Tulsa Race Massacre survivor story | March 23, 2020 |
| 214 | "Live at the Davies Symphony Hall in San Francisco (2018)" | Murder of Cecilia Bowers; Alcatraz Escape of 1962 | March 19, 2020 |
| Minisode | "MFM "Maxisode" 166" | Coronavirus pandemic; Hometown murders | March 16, 2020 |
| 213 | "Live at the Northrop Auditorium in Minneapolis (2019)" | Murder of Louis Arbogast; Harry T. Hayward | March 12, 2020 |
| Minisode | "MFM Minisode 165" | John List connection; A murder van | March 9, 2020 |
| 212 | "Hot Money" | Sally Ride, Space Shuttle Challenger Disaster; Corpsewood Manor murders | March 5, 2020 |
| Minisode | "MFM Minisode 164" | Workplace-based murder; Flashlight in the backyard | March 2, 2020 |
| 211 | "It Was My Birthday, Forensic Files!" | Hijacking of Pan Am Flight 73; Tulsa race massacre | February 27, 2020 |
| Minisode | "MFM Minisode 163" | A fishing trip with Al Capone; An aunt who thought she was dead | February 24, 2020 |
| 210 | "Every Plan Is A Bad Plan" | Murder of Mary Phagan and revenge murder of Leo Frank; Wonderland murders | February 20, 2020 |
| Minisode | "MFM Minisode 162" | Prison rescue; Murder trial witness | February 17, 2020 |
| 209 | "Big Sweater Energy" | Death of Davina Buff Jones; Survival story of Tiffany Taylor | February 13, 2020 |
| Minisode | "MFM Minisode 161" | Family murders; A "haunted" hamburger | February 10, 2020 |
| 208 | "Live at the Orpheum Theater in Omaha (2019)" | Murder of John Sheedy; Murder of Cari Farver | February 6, 2020 |
| Minisode | "MFM Minisode 160" | A murder; A touching ghost story | February 3, 2020 |
| 207 | "Not Enough Ednas" | Fairbanks Four; Dixmoor 5 | January 30, 2020 |
| Minisode | "MFM Minisode 159" | Badass great-grandma; A very close call | January 27, 2020 |
| 206 | "Spatula City" | Laurie Dann; Leopold and Loeb | January 23, 2020 |
| Minisode | "MFM Minisode 158" | Alaskan mystery; Edmund Kemper-related possession | January 20, 2020 |
| 205 | "Everyone Gets A Horse" | The Blackout Murders; Scott Scurlock, the Hollywood Bandit | January 16, 2020 |
| Minisode | "MFM Minisode 157" | Serial killer connections; A thieving uncle | January 13, 2020 |
| 204 | "Periodical Time Tables" | The Butcher Baker Robert Hansen; Murder of Dorothy Jane Scott | January 9, 2020 |
| Minisode | "MFM Minisode 156" | Badass grandmas; Tales from the county morgue | January 6, 2020 |
| 203 | "Live at the Fox Theatre in Atlanta (2018)" | Barbara Mackle kidnapping; Barbie Bandits | January 2, 2020 |
| Minisode | "MFM Minisode 155" | Wholesome ghost story; Fiancé that almost got away with murder | December 30, 2019 |
| 202 | "Live at the Sony Centre in Toronto (Night Two)" | Ant Hill cult; Murder of Renee Sweeney | December 26, 2019 |
| Minisode | "MFM Minisode 154" | Unusual stalking story; Family secret | December 23, 2019 |
| 201 | "Live at Revolution Hall in Portland (2017)" | William Scott Smith; Murders at Crater Lake | December 19, 2019 |
| Minisode | "MFM Minisode 153" | Silver Bridge collapse connection; Mall creep | December 16, 2019 |
| 200 | "The Humility of Knowing: A 200th Episode Spectacular" | Disappearance of Johnny Gosch; Malahide massacre | December 12, 2019 |
| Minisode | "MFM Minisode 152" | Babysitting misadventures; Murder | December 9, 2019 |
| 199 | "Live at the Hammersmith Apollo in London" | Dr. Thomas Neill Cream; Enfield poltergeist | December 5, 2019 |
| Minisode | "MFM Minisode 151" | Escaped convict; Grandparents with knives | December 2, 2019 |
| 198 | "Live at the Bord Gáis Energy Theatre in Dublin" | Dorcas "Darkey" Kelly; "Lying Eyes" Sharon Collins | November 29, 2019 |
| Minisode | "MFM Minisode 150" | Scottish serial killer connection; Moor-based mystery | November 25, 2019 |
| 197 | "Grandma Surprise" | The origin of Stockholm syndrome: the Norrmalmstorg robbery; Mack Ray Edwards | November 21, 2019 |
| Minisode | "MFM Minisode 149" | Loch Ness near miss; Rural Ireland murder | November 18, 2019 |
| 196 | "The Baddest of Them All" | Gray Widow murderers; Burger Chef murders | November 14, 2019 |
| Minisode | "MFM Minisode 148 - Live at My Favorite Weekend in Santa Barbara" | Serial killer connections; Neighborhood stalker | November 11, 2019 |
| 195 | "Live at My Favorite Weekend in Santa Barbara" | Disappearance of the Salomon Family; Thor Nis Christiansen | November 7, 2019 |
| Minisode | "MFM Minisode 147" | Seeing a dead body with mom; Child suspected of murder | November 4, 2019 |
| 194 | "The SpoOoky Halloween Hometown Special" | Spooky stories | October 31, 2019 |
| Minisode | "MFM Minisode 146" | Sibling break-in; Family murder | October 28, 2019 |
| 193 | "The Lowest Limit" | Gerald and Charlene Gallego; Gary Krueger | October 24, 2019 |
| Minisode | "MFM Minisode 145" | Childhood adventure gone wrong; Serial killer connections | October 21, 2019 |
| 192 | "Sticking Together & Helping Out" | Disappearance of Emanuela Orlandi; Oversteegen Sisters (Truus and Freddie) and Hannie Schaft | October 17, 2019 |
| Minisode | "MFM Minisode 144" | Mystery in a wall; Crime involving a cow | October 14, 2019 |
| 191 | "Live at the Arvest Bank Theatre in Kansas City" | Meeks family murder; Hotel President haunting | October 10, 2019 |
| Minisode | "MFM Minisode 143" | Local hauntings; Murderous ancestors | October 7, 2019 |
| 190 | "Lick the Clock" | Radium Girls; Murder of Lisa Cihaski | October 3, 2019 |
| Minisode | "MFM Minisode 142" | Small island murder; Break-in story | September 30, 2019 |
| 189 | "What Wonderful Luck!" | The alleged real-life story of The Orphan (Natalia Barnett); Triangle Shirtwaist Factory fire | September 26, 2019 |
| Minisode | "MFM Minisode 141" | Show and tell; Body in a window | September 23, 2019 |
| 188 | "The You & Me of This Group" | Dyatlov Pass incident; Linda Hazzard | September 19, 2019 |
| Special | "Fox's Prodigal Son Special!" | Sante Kimes and Dolly Oesterreich; Interview with Bellamy Young | September 16, 2019 |
| Minisode | "MFM Minisode 140" | Kidnapping in Australia; Premature burial stories | September 16, 2019 |
| 187 | "Live at the Toyota Music Factory in Irving" | Texas Cheerleader Mom murder plot; Vicky Lyons | September 12, 2019 |
| Minisode | "MFM Minisode 139" | Morgue story; Gun range | September 9, 2019 |
| 186 | "Sprankers!" | Carl Tanzler; Stories of people buried alive | September 5, 2019 |
| Minisode | "MFM Minisode 138" | Hitchhiking scare; Home invasion | September 2, 2019 |
| 185 | "400 Peeled Potatoes" | Murder of Angie Dodge; "Doctor" Malachi Love-Robinson | August 29, 2019 |
| Minisode | "MFM Minisode 137" | Triple homicide; Death by a snail | August 26, 2019 |
| 184 | "Weighted Blanket" | The Doodler; Deaths of Kris Kremers and Lisanne Froon | August 22, 2019 |
| Minisode | "MFM Minisode 136" | Serial killer connection; Acid trip discovery | August 19, 2019 |
| 183 | "Here We Back Are" | Murder of Jacob Wetterling; Mothman legend and Silver Bridge collapse | August 15, 2019 |
| Special | "My Favorite Murder Presents: The Fall Line Season 5 - Episode 1" | Disappearance of Shy'Kemmia Pate | August 14, 2019 |
| Minisode | "MFM Minisode 135 - The Heartwarmers" | Heartwarming stories | August 12, 2019 |
| Special | "MFM The Top 3: #1 - Episode 18 - Investigateighteen Discovery" | The survival of Mary Vincent; Franklin Delano Floyd | August 8, 2019 |
| Minisode | "MFM Minisode 134 - The Ghosts" | Ghost stories | August 5, 2019 |
| Special | "MFM The Top 3: #2 - Episode 129 - Coincidence Island" | Honolulu Strangler; The Galapagos Affair | August 1, 2019 |
| Minisode | "MFM Minisode 133 - The Traysure" | Treasure and things found in walls | July 29, 2019 |
| Special | "The Top 3: #3 - Episode 105 - Proclensity" | Murder of Christa Worthington; Typhoid Mary | July 25, 2019 |
| Minisode | "MFM Minisode 132 - The Grandparents" | Grandmas and grandpas | July 22, 2019 |
| 182 | "Something Kevin-y (The Book Q&A)" | Question and answer about Stay Sexy and Don't Get Murdered | July 18, 2019 |
| Minisode | "MFM Minisode 131 - The Worst" | Serial killers | July 15, 2019 |
| 181 | "Live at the Riverside Theater in Milwaukee (2017)" | David Spanbauer; Ed Gein | July 11, 2019 |
| Minisode | "MFM Minisode 130" | Stories that inspired animated shorts | July 8, 2019 |
| 180 | "Live at the Tampa Theatre in Tampa" | Oscar Ray Bolin; Bobby Joe Long | July 4, 2019 |
| Minisode | "MFM Minisode 129" | Tip about eyeballs; "Last" responder story | July 1, 2019 |
| 179 | "Live at the Clusterfest in San Francisco" | Mitchell brothers murder; Ted Kaczynski | June 27, 2019 |
| Minisode | "MFM Minisode 128" | Ypsilanti Ripper connection; Drive-thru rescue | June 24, 2019 |
| 178 | "Live at the Folketeatret in Oslo" | Isdal Woman; Black Metal murders | June 20, 2019 |
| Minisode | "MFM Minisode 127" | Family murder; Alligator attack | June 17, 2019 |
| 177 | "Live at the Riverside Theatre in Milwaukee" | Laurie "Bambi" Bembenek; Murder of Barbara Kendhammer | June 13, 2019 |
| Minisode | "MFM Minisode 126" | Dad stories; Detroit murder spree | June 10, 2019 |
| 176 | "The LA Book Tour Event at the Wilshire Ebell Theatre" | Stay Sexy and Don't Get Murdered book tour hosted by Lizzy Cooperman | June 6, 2019 |
| Minisode | "MFM Minisode 125" | Sleepwalking near-miss; Paramedic story | June 3, 2019 |
| 175 | "Live at the Civic Center Music Hall" | High Hat Club Killer; Oklahoma City Butcher | May 30, 2019 |
| Minisode | "MFM Minisode 124" | Two close calls; Sickle-wielding maniac | May 27, 2019 |
| 174 | "Rough Winds & High Waters" | The bodies of Mount Everest; Paul Michael Stephani | May 23, 2019 |
| Minisode | "MFM Minisode 123" | A badass mom; Ed Kemper's house | May 20, 2019 |
| 173 | "Live at the W. L. Lyons Brown Theatre in Louisville" | Torture House of 1924; Murder of Marlene Oakes | May 16, 2019 |
| Minisode | "MFM Minisode 122" | Drug-addicted oral surgeon; Near-arrest in Paris | May 13, 2019 |
| 172 | "I'm Fine, Look Away" | Death of Joan Robinson Hill; Murder of Jeannette DePalma | May 9, 2019 |
| Minisode | "MFM Minisode 121" | Easter revelation; Ice-themed rescue story | May 6, 2019 |
| 171 | "Live at the Bellco Theatre in Denver" | Murder of Adolph Coors III; Alferd Packer | May 2, 2019 |
| Minisode | "MFM Minisode 120" | Librarian stories; Hidden treasure | April 29, 2019 |
| 170 | "Habeas Delicious" | Murder of Helle Crafts; Hyatt Regency walkway collapse | April 25, 2019 |
| Minisode | "MFM Minisode 119" | Therapist stalker; Murderous DJ | April 22, 2019 |
| 169 | "This Old Sandwich" | Ricardo Medina Jr.; Murder of Denise Huber | April 18, 2019 |
| Minisode | "MFM Minisode 118" | Helpful rugby team; 80s mom story | April 15, 2019 |
| 168 | "Live at the Civic Center in Des Moines" | Tracey Richter; Villisca axe murders | April 11, 2019 |
| Minisode | "MFM Minisode 117" | Self-defense tale; Bus station story | April 8, 2019 |
| 167 | "Bomb Grade" | Death of Karen Silkwood; Samuel Little | April 4, 2019 |
| Minisode | "MFM Minisode 116" | Badass granny; First responder story | April 1, 2019 |
| 166 | "Respecting the History of Coins" | The Who concert disaster; Glennon Engleman | March 28, 2019 |
| Minisode | "MFM Minisode 115" | Church parking lot murder; Sleep-driving story | March 25, 2019 |
| 165 | "Live at the Old National Centre in Indianapolis" | Richmond Hill explosion; Murder of Marjorie Jackson | March 21, 2019 |
| Minisode | "MFM Minisode 114" | Badass mom; Advice about peepholes | March 18, 2019 |
| 164 | "Live at the Sony Centre in Toronto" | Murder of Julie Stanton; Massey maid murder | March 14, 2019 |
| Minisode | "MFM Minisode 113" | EMT story; Bodies in the yard | March 11, 2019 |
| 163 | "Nine Cocaines" | Murder of Bob Crane; Dexter Copycat Killer | March 7, 2019 |
| Minisode | "MFM Minisode 112" | Murderous babysitter; Animal rescue story | March 4, 2019 |
| 162 | "Prom Queen City" | Mark Rogowski; Death of Jane Bashara | February 28, 2019 |
| Minisode | "MFM Minisode 111" | Stairwell survival story; Murder cult | February 25, 2019 |
| 161 | "Live at the Blaisdell Concert Hall in Honolulu" | Murder of Yvonne Mathison; Maui Yoga Twin case | February 21, 2019 |
| Minisode | "MFM Minisode 110" | Creepy neighbors; Murderer in a hospital | February 18, 2019 |
| 160 | "Cynthia & Barry" | Story of Eddie Aikau; Sleepwalking murderer | February 14, 2019 |
| Minisode | "MFM Minisode 109" | Scuba-themed funeral; Shower-based sex cult | February 10, 2019 |
| 159 | "Live at the Lyric in Baltimore" | Murder of Carolyn Wasilewski; Baltimore Plot | February 7, 2019 |
| Minisode | "MFM Minisode 108" | Dispatcher rescue; Prison "found in walls" story | February 4, 2019 |
| 158 | "Burn Day" | Three Billboards Outside Ebbing, Missouri; San Ysidro McDonald's massacre | January 31, 2019 |
| Minisode | "MFM Minisode 107" | Suspicious dad; Mummy | January 28, 2019 |
| Special | "The Live TNT's I Am The Night Special" | Black Dahlia Murder | January 25, 2019 |
| 157 | "Live at the Civic Theatre in San Diego" | The Torrey Pines Beach murders; Rose Petal murder | January 24, 2019 |
| Minisode | "MFM Minisode 106" | SWAT team invasion; Crime scene photographer | January 21, 2019 |
| 156 | "Mr. Cool & Nice - The Conan O'Brien Episode" | Conversation with Conan O'Brien | January 17, 2019 |
| Minisode | "MFM Minisode 105" | Cooking oil-filled arrest; Machete murderer connection | January 14, 2019 |
| 155 | "You Don't Know What You Don't Know" | Murder of Su Taraskiewicz; Murder of Abraham Shakespeare | January 10, 2019 |
| Minisode | "MFM Minisode 104" | Food court stabbing; Richard Speck connection | January 7, 2019 |
| 154 | "DNA Dad" | Death of Thelma Todd; Colin Pitchfork | January 1, 2019 |
| Minisode | "MFM Minisode 103" | Family skeletons; Solving a murder | December 31, 2018 |
| 153 | "MFM: Origins" | Origins of memorable My Favorite Murder quotes | December 27, 2018 |
| Minisode | "MFM Minisode 102" | Killer in the home; Riding in cars with strangers | December 24, 2018 |
| 152 | "Live at the O2 Academy in Glasgow" | Peter Tobin; Burke and Hare murders | December 20, 2018 |
| Minisode | "MFM Minisode 101" | Mennonite murder; City found in a wall | December 17, 2018 |
| 151 | "Live at the Queen Elizabeth Theatre in Vancouver" | Terry Driver; Salish Sea human foot discoveries | December 15, 2018 |
| Minisode | "MFM Minisode 100" | Mary Vincent connection; Rehab cults | December 10, 2018 |
| 150 | "How Dare You Kelli" | Alice Riley, the first woman hanged in colonial Georgia; Murder of Reyna Marroquín | December 6, 2018 |
| Minisode | "MFM Minisode 99" | Ice cream trucks; Creepy uncle stories | December 3, 2018 |
| 149 | "Lifestyle & Feelings" | Wayne Nance; Forest Park murders by Todd Alan Reed | November 29, 2018 |
| Minisode | "The Exactly Right Podcast Network Spotlight Minisode" | The four shows joining the Exactly Right podcast network: Do You Need a Ride, The Purrrcast, The Fall Line, and This Podcast Will Kill You | November 28, 2018 |
| Minisode | "MFM Minisode 98" | Ship-based murder; Whitey Bulger connection | November 26, 2018 |
| 148 | "Live at the Community Center Theater in Sacramento" | The attempted assassination of President Gerald Ford; Lodi Haystack murder | November 22, 2018 |
| Minisode | "MFM Minisode 97" | "Murder meet cute"; Cult lawyer | November 19, 2018 |
| 147 | "Live in Austin" | The inspiration for The Texas Chain Saw Massacre, Robert Elmer Kleason; Poisoning death of Steven Robards | November 15, 2018 |
| Minisode | "MFM Minisode 96" | Clown attack; Advice from a mobster | November 12, 2018 |
| 146 | "Dawna's Skinny Lighter" | Obsessed pilot Randy Mock; Stella Nickell | November 8, 2018 |
| Minisode | "MFM Minisode 95" | Pastor story; Lemur man | November 5, 2018 |
| 145 | "Live at the Microsoft Theater in Los Angeles" | McMartin preschool trial; Elmer McCurdy | November 1, 2018 |
| Minisode | "MFM Minisode 94" | Ghost stories; Oozing walls | October 29, 2018 |
| 144 | "Live at the Chevalier Theatre in Medford, MA" | Murder of George Parkman; Great Molasses Flood | October 25, 2018 |
| Minisode | "MFM Minisode 93" | Freeway mystery; Zodiac Killer connection | October 22, 2018 |
| 143 | "DeSabotage" | Poisoned candy myths and Ronald Clark O'Bryan; Charles Stuart | October 18, 2018 |
| Minisode | "MFM Minisode 92" | Flip phone ghost story; Death bed confession | October 15, 2018 |
| 142 | "Live at the Durham Performing Arts Center" | Murder of the Lawson family; Bitter Blood murders | October 11, 2018 |
| Minisode | "MFM Minisode 91" | Creepy ghost story; Bank robbery coincidences | October 8, 2018 |
| 141 | "Big Thirsty Robe" | Survivors from the MS Express Samina; Murder of Linda Bailey Brown | October 4, 2018 |
| Minisode | "MFM Minisode 90" | Hand found in a canal; Attempted burglary | October 1, 2018 |
| 140 | "Icebreakers & More!" | Listener questions | September 27, 2018 |
| Minisode | "MFM Minisode 89" | John List connection; Trivia night story | September 24, 2018 |
| 139 | "A Hundred Feelings" | Kunz family murders; Murder of Joan Dawley | September 20, 2018 |
| Minisode | "MFM Minisode 88" | Jury duty on acid; Car accident mystery | September 17, 2018 |
| 138 | "Live at the Red Rock Ballroom in Las Vegas" | Murder of Gerard Soules; Death of Ted Binion | September 13, 2018 |
| Minisode | "MFM Minisode 87" | Arms dealer; Drug drops | September 10, 2018 |
| 137 | "Gloogle" | Murder of BBC reporter Jill Dando; Andrews family "hauntings" | September 6, 2018 |
| Minisode | "MFM Minisode 86" | Attempted kidnappings; Things found in cars | September 3, 2018 |
| 136 | "The Uninhibited" | Murder of Stanford White; Death of Don Henry and Kevin Ives | August 30, 2018 |
| Minisode | "MFM Minisode 85" | Attempted murder; Swinging grandparents | August 27, 2018 |
| 135 | "The Multiverse Trajectory" | The Party Monster murder of Angel Melendez; Clarence and Melinda Elkins | August 23, 2018 |
| Minisode | "MFM Minisode 84" | People hiding secret lives | August 20, 2018 |
| 134 | "Live at the Connor Palace in Cleveland" | Ed Edwards; Kirtland cult killings | August 16, 2018 |
| Minisode | "MFM Minisode 83" | Cult member roommate; Surprise found in a wall | August 13, 2018 |
| 133 | "Made of Crystals" | Danny Rolling; Lady of the Dunes | August 9, 2018 |
| Minisode | "MFM Minisode 82" | True love at the morgue; Rigor mortis story | August 6, 2018 |
| 132 | "Awful Peanut" | The cult of Synanon; Death of Azaria Chamberlain | August 2, 2018 |
| Minisode | "MFM Minisode 81" | Bad piano teacher; Cemetery surprise | July 30, 2018 |
| 131 | "Live at the Chinateatern in Stockholm" | Nikita Bergenström; Sture Bergwall, a.k.a. Thomas Quick | July 26, 2018 |
| Minisode | "MFM Minisode 80" | Misplaced ashes; Genetic testing gone wrong | July 22, 2018 |
| 130 | "Mike is Right" | Execution of the Romanov family; Fred and Rosemary West | July 19, 2018 |
| Minisode | "MFM Minisode 79" | Son of Sam connection; Golf club-wielding nana | July 16, 2018 |
| 129 | "Coincidence Island" | Honolulu Strangler; The Galapagos Affair | July 12, 2018 |
| Minisode | "MFM Minisode 78" | Dead body in a hot tub; Pair of thieves | July 9, 2018 |
| 128 | "Live at Albert Hall in Manchester" | Mary Ann Britland; Trevor Hardy | July 5, 2018 |
| Minisode | "MFM Minisode 77" | Neighborhood intruder; Sinkhole/cult combo | July 1, 2018 |
| 127 | "Our Beautiful Rat King" | Murder of Angela Samota; Lake Bodom murders | June 28, 2018 |
| Minisode | "MFM Minisode 76" | Home invasion; Bomb squad investigation | June 24, 2018 |
| 126 | "Nice Office" | Lawrence DeLisle; Murder of Kim Wall | June 21, 2018 |
| Minisode | "MFM Minisode 75" | Cult stories; Sword-based crime | June 18, 2018 |
| 125 | "Bedside Astrologer!" | Survival story of Scott Johnston and Sean Farmer; Harvey Glatman | June 14, 2018 |
| Minisode | "MFM Minisode 74" | Workplace murderer; Serial killer Grand Am | June 11, 2018 |
| 124 | "Errant Duct Tape" | Mr. Cruel; Murder of Girly Chew Hossencofft | June 7, 2018 |
| Minisode | "MFM Minisode 73" | Cocaine story; Great-great-grandma's deathbed confession | June 4, 2018 |
| 123 | "Live at Vicar Street Dublin" | Stoneybatter Strangler; Colin Whelan | May 31, 2018 |
| Minisode | "MFM Minisode 72" | Golden State Killer connections; Druid murder | May 28, 2018 |
| 122 | "Surprise! It's Paul Holes" | Golden State Killer case update | May 24, 2018 |
| Minisode | "MFM Minisode 71" | Tiger sanctuary cult; Rabies tales | May 21, 2018 |
| 121 | "Clomp Everywhere" | Listener questions | May 17, 2018 |
| Minisode | "MFM Minisode 70" | Swedish bank robbery; Hiking discovery | May 14, 2018 |
| 120 | "Live at the Orpheum in Los Angeles" | LA crime journalist Agness Underwood; Los Feliz Murder Mansion | May 10, 2018 |
| Minisode | "MFM Minisode 69" | Hot Dog Murders; Ghost story | May 7, 2018 |
| 119 | "Fingers Everywhere" | William Heirens; Lindbergh kidnapping | May 3, 2018 |
| Minisode | "MFM Minisode 68" | JFK connection; False confession | April 30, 2018 |
| 118 | "Golden State Killer Caught!" | Golden State Killer | April 26, 2018 |
| Minisode | "MFM Minisode 67" | Knife fight at a wedding; House filled with treasure | April 23, 2018 |
| 117 | "Reality's Canceled" | The survival of Teka Adams; West Mesa murders | April 19, 2018 |
| Minisode | "MFM Minisode 66" | Drew Peterson connection; Parking lot discovery | April 16, 2018 |
| 116 | "Robot Grandma" | Jesse Pomeroy; Issei Sagawa | April 12, 2018 |
| Minisode | "MFM Minisode 65" | Hillside Stranglers connection; Jury coincidence | April 9, 2018 |
| 115 | "I'll Be Gone In The Dark at Skylight Books" | I'll Be Gone In The Dark by Michelle McNamara | April 5, 2018 |
| Minisode | "MFM Minisode 64" | Pair of mysterious shoes in a basement; Fruitcake in the mail | April 2, 2018 |
| 114 | "Civic Order" | The Hillside Stranglers; Murder of Dana Bradley | March 29, 2018 |
| Minisode | "MFM Minisode 63" | Creepy dentist; Cash found under a tree | March 26, 2018 |
| 113 | "Live at Kingsbury Hall in Salt Lake City" | Ronnie Lee Gardner; Salt Lake City Public Library hostage incident | March 22, 2018 |
| Minisode | "MFM Minisode 62" | Farmer's diary; Ted Kaczynski encounter | March 19, 2018 |
| 112 | "Galore Galore!" | Murder of Rachel Hoffman; Murder of Bonnie Lee Bakley | March 15, 2018 |
| Minisode | "MFM Minisode 61" | Funny man haunting; "Lighthearted" near-kidnapping | March 12, 2018 |
| 111 | "Figure It Out Kevin" | Van Nuys Courthouse shooting; Juana Barraza (La Mataviejitas) | March 8, 2018 |
| Minisode | "MFM Minisode 60" | Sand dune sinkholes; Suspicious thrift store finds; Call-in story about babysitting | March 5, 2018 |
| 110 | "Live at the Palace Theatre in Columbus" | Donald Harvey; Circleville Letters | March 1, 2018 |
| Minisode | "MFM Minisode 59" | Lake monster; Holy water haunting; Ted Bundy connection | February 26, 2018 |
| 109 | "Project Artichoke" | Cindy James; McStay family murders | February 22, 2018 |
| Minisode | "MFM Minisode 58" | Jodi Arias updates; First responder tussle; Suspicious chemical spill | February 19, 2018 |
| 108 | "King of Police" | Matthew Hoffman; Murder of Grégory Villemin | February 15, 2018 |
| Minisode | "MFM Minisode 57" | Kidnapping; Haunted ballerina dolls; Hiking date gone wrong | February 12, 2018 |
| 107 | "Live from the Revolving Stage at the Celebrity Theater in Phoenix" | Winnie Ruth Judd; Jodi Arias | February 8, 2018 |
| Minisode | "MFM Minisode 56" | Sinkholes; Childhood sister rivalry; Most intense first day of work ever | February 5, 2018 |
| 106 | "Courage Shoulders" | Murder of Theresa Katherine Foster; Luigi Longhi | February 1, 2018 |
| Minisode | "MFM Minisode 55" | Gas station close calls; Making a mugger cry; A killer in the family | January 29, 2018 |
| 105 | "Proclensity" | Murder of Christa Worthington; Typhoid Mary | January 25, 2018 |
| Minisode | "MFM Minisode 54" | A good dog; Foot stompings; Haunted elevator; Satanic Panic | January 22, 2018 |
| 104 | "Garden Party" | Survivor story of ER nurse Susan Kuhnhausen; Order of the Solar Temple mass murders | January 18, 2018 |
| Minisode | "MFM Minisode 53" | Mysterious intruder; Dungeon room discovery | January 15, 2018 |
| 103 | "Live at the Balboa Theater in San Diego" | Betty Broderick; Heaven's Gate cult | January 11, 2018 |
| Minisode | "MFM Minisode 52" | Dead body in the woods; Surprising break in a murder case | January 8, 2018 |
| 102 | "Decompressions" | Edward Paisnel; Cleveland Torso Killer | January 4, 2018 |
| 101 | "Live at the Majestic Theater in Dallas" | Cult leader Terri Hoffman; Sandra Bridewell | December 28, 2017 |
| Minisode | "MFM Minisode 51" | Caroling gone wrong; Ceramic Christmas tree; A grandmother's conversation with the mob | December 25, 2017 |
| 100 | "The 100th Episode" | Michael Peterson; Documentary The Staircase and the theories it raises about Peterson's crime | December 21, 2017 |
| Minisode | "MFM Minisode 50" | Dangers of sleeping naked; Badass grandma; Civil War horror tale | December 18, 2017 |
| 99 | "Shin Kick" | Killing of Bich Pan; Murder of Irene Garza | December 14, 2017 |
| Minisode | "MFM Minisode 49" | Finding stuff in walls | December 11, 2017 |
| 98 | "Grasp It" | Marcel Petiot; Peggy Hettrick murder case | December 7, 2017 |
| Minisode | "MFM Minisode 48" | Killer uncle; Lucky ELO belt buckle; Ghost that likes horses | December 4, 2017 |
| 97 | "The Hague" | David Meirhofer; Randall Saito | November 30, 2017 |
| Minisode | "MFM Minisode 47" | Cheshire, Connecticut, home invasion murders | November 27, 2017 |
| 96 | "Live at the Hard Rock in Orlando, FL" | Aileen Wuornos; Judy Buenoano | November 23, 2017 |
| Minisode | "MFM Minisode 46" | Cannibalistic aunt; Mysterious mini disco ball; Twin Peaks in real life | November 20, 2017 |
| 95 | "Gesus" | Amish serial killer Eli Stutzman; Three disappearances: Springfield Three (Sherrill Levitt, Suzie Streeter, and Stacy McCall), Asha Degree, and Bobby Dunbar | November 16, 2017 |
| Minisode | "MFM Minisode 45" | Tampa serial killer connection; Twelve-year-old first responder; A haunted castle; Son of Sam dog | November 13, 2017 |
| 94 | "Go Get Your Thing" | Bloody Bender family; Moorhouse murders | November 9, 2017 |
| Minisode | "MFM Minisode 44" | Dean Corll connections; Lawnmower Man | November 6, 2017 |
| 93 | "Live at The Grove in Anaheim" | Daniel Wozniak; Disneyland deaths | November 2, 2017 |
| Minisode | "MFM Minisode 43" | Fieldwork tale; A lawnmower man; Road trip incidents | October 30, 2017 |
| 92 | "Halloween Special" | Listener-submitted ghost stories | October 26, 2017 |
| Minisode | "MFM Minisode 42" | Serial killer relation; Badminton murder | October 23, 2017 |
| 91 | "Live at the Sony Centre in Toronto" | Paul Bernardo and Karla Homolka; Murder of Lynne Harper | October 19, 2017 |
| Minisode | "MFM Minisode 41" | Mother's brush with almost attempted murder; Deadly magician; Attempted kidnappings; Onstage proposal | October 16, 2017 |
| 90 | "Peak Experience" | Amityville Horror murders; Neville Heath | October 12, 2017 |
| Minisode | "MFM Minisode 40" | Spooky happenings from a nurse; Fingerprint dust date night; Teen that worked with a serial killer | October 9, 2017 |
| 89 | "The Finch" | Dean Corll; Silent Movie Theater Murder | October 5, 2017 |
| 88 | "Live at the Comedy Theater" | Ivan Milat; The Brownout Strangler | September 28, 2017 |
| Minisode | "MFM Minisode 39" | High school detective story; Helpful granny | September 25, 2017 |
| 87 | "Hither and Yon" | Jack Gilbert Graham; Son Of Sam | September 21, 2017 |
| Minisode | "MFM Minisode 38" | True crime family; Online video game demon killer; Supernatural tales from down under | September 18, 2017 |
| 86 | "Live at the Enmore Theater" | The "Melbourne incident"; Caroline Grills; Shark Arm case | September 14, 2017 |
| 85 | "Live at the Boulder Theater" | John Agrue; Theodore Edward Coneys, the Spider-Man of Denver | September 7, 2017 |
| 84 | "Harvard 2" | Theresa Knorr; "Persian Princess" mummy hoax; Abduction of Chloe Ayling; A Pittsburgh attic creeper; Murder of Kim Wall | August 31, 2017 |
| Minisode | "MFM Minisode 37" | One good dog; Childhood neighbor disappearance; Manhunt along the American/Canadian border; Badass grandma | August 24, 2017 |
| 83 | "The MFM/Unqualified with Anna Faris Crossover Special Pt. 2" | Rebecca Schaeffer; Charlie Brandt | August 21, 2017 |
| Minisode | "MFM Minisode 36" | Letter from a young listener; Surprise lion encounter; Touching ghost story; "Laziest" kidnapping attempt ever | August 17, 2017 |
| TBA | "The MFM/Unqualified with Anna Faris Crossover Special Pt. 1" | BTK Killer; Relationship dealbreakers | August 15, 2017 |
| 81 | "Weapon Bush" | The Vampire of Düsseldorf Peter Kürten; Jeffrey MacDonald | August 10, 2017 |
| 80 | "Live At the Rams Head Live" | Joseph C. Palczynski; Joseph Kallinger | August 3, 2017 |
| Minisode | "MFM Minisode 35" | A haunting or two; Friendship formed with a thief; David Lee Roth impersonator | July 31, 2017 |
| 79 | "Sharpest Needle In The Tack" | Erie Collar Bomb Heist; Jerry Brudos, the Shoe Fetish Slayer | July 27, 2017 |
| Minisode | "MFM Minisode 34" | Juggalo ritual; Gas station survival story; Death bed confession | July 24, 2017 |
| 78 | "The Freshest Recording" | Survival story of justice advocate Ellen Halbert; Oklahoma Girl Scout murders | July 20, 2017 |
| Minisode | "MFM Minisode 33" | High speed chase; FBI plane crash; Unforgettable sushi encounter | July 17, 2017 |
| 77 | "Live At The Keswick Theatre" | Gary M. Heidnik; Edward Gingerich | July 13, 2017 |
| Minisode | "MFM Minisode 32" | EMTS; London escapse; Follow-up to the Berkeley hostage crisis | July 10, 2017 |
| 76 | "My Own Sinkhole" | Mark Hofmann; Central Park 5 | July 6, 2017 |
| 75 | "Breakfast Wine" | The Main Line Murders; Murder of Spider Sabich | June 29, 2017 |
| 74 | "Jews Vs. Catholics" | The Carbon Copy Murders; Annecy shootings | June 22, 2017 |
| Minisode | "MFM Minisode 31" | Story of survival; Lighthearted SWAT team takeover; Encounter with a creepy tree man | June 19, 2017 |
| 73 | "Chill Satanist" | The Berkeley Hostage Crisis (a.k.a. Henry's Pub hostage incident); Fall River Cult Murders | June 15, 2017 |
| Minisode | "MFM Minisode 30" | Terrifying discovery in a crawlspace; Murder of Micaela Costanzo; Smiley Face Bomber | June 12, 2017 |
| 72 | "Steven It Out" | Larry Eyler; John Leonard Orr | June 8, 2017 |
| 71 | "Put It In A Door" | John Brennan Crutchley; Genene Jones; Discussion of the Netflix documentary series The Keepers | June 1, 2017 |
| Minisode | "MFM Minisode 29" | Sad boys; A Santa Cruz killer; Murder marriage hotel | May 29, 2017 |
| 70 | "Live at the Moontower Comedy Festival" | Yogurt Shop Murders; Servant Girl Annihilator | May 25, 2017 |
| Minisode | "MFM Minisode 28" | Hometowns from D.C., Baltimore, and Philadelphia; Hometown from Georgia Hardstark's uncle Gene | May 22, 2017 |
| 69 | "Never A Mannequin" | The Riverside Killer William Suff; Death of Keith Warren | May 18, 2017 |
| 68 | "Q&T&A" | Listener questions | May 11, 2017 |
| Minisode | "MFM Minisode 27" | Stories from EMTs and first responders | May 8, 2017 |
| 67 | "Live at the Egyptian Room" | Belle Gunness; Herb Baumeister | May 4, 2017 |
| Minisode | "MFM Minisode 26" | Retirement community; Ball-peen hammer | May 1, 2017 |
| 66 | "The Devil's Number" | Exorcism of Anneliese Michel; The Vienna Strangler, Jack Unterweger | April 27, 2017 |
| Minisode | "MFM Minisode 25" | Arby's axe murder; Haunted apartment | April 24, 2017 |
| 65 | "Pre-Milked Cereal" | Ronni Chasen; Death of Mitrice Richardson | April 20, 2017 |
| 64 | "Live At Revolution Hall" | Bobby Jack Fowler; Cline Falls axe attack | April 13, 2017 |
| Minisode | "MFM Minisode 24" | Stories from Indianapolis, Milwaukee, and Chicago | April 10, 2017 |
| 63 | "Steven's Tuxedo" | Joseph Edward Duncan; Fred Neulander | April 6, 2017 |
| Minisode | "MFM Minisode 23" | Hometown murders and near-misses | April 3, 2017 |
| 62 | "Trust Issues & Ice Skate Shoes" | Moors murders; Earle Nelson | March 30, 2017 |
| 61 | "Live at the Neptune" | Murder of punk singer Mia Zapata; Ted Bundy | March 23, 2017 |
| Minisode | "MFM Minisode 22" | A cop's run-in with Ottis Toole; Pizza drug lords; Why you should never go to Poughkeepsie | March 20, 2017 |
| 60 | "Jazz It" | Axeman of New Orleans; William Bradford Bishop | March 16, 2017 |
| Minisode | "MFM Minisode 21" | Neighbor with cannibalistic intentions; Wesson Massacre; Near miss while peeing in the woods | March 13, 2017 |
| 59 | "Live At The Wilbur" | Death of Molly Bish; Kenneth Harrison, a.k.a. "The Giggler" | March 9, 2017 |
| Minisode | "MFM Minisode 20" | Hometown murders from Boston and New York City | March 6, 2017 |
| 58 | "Some Quiet Sunday" | Ursula and Sabina Eriksson; Mel Ignatow; Local story from comedian Kurt Braunohler | March 2, 2017 |
| 57 | "Live At The Fox Theater" | Speed Freak Killers; Herbert Mullin | February 23, 2017 |
| Minisode | "MFM Minisode 19" | I Survived-esque story; Pot smoker's near brush with a killer | February 20, 2017 |
| 56 | "Service Poodle" | Darlie Routier; Roscoe "Fatty" Arbuckle | February 16, 2017 |
| Minisode | "MFM Minisode 18" | Donald Duck Killer; Meat Cleaver Murderer | February 13, 2017 |
| 55 | "Let's Hear Your Podcast" | Christine and Léa Papin; Dr. Sam Sheppard | February 9, 2017 |
| Minisode | "MFM Minisode 17" | Hometown murders from Austria, Ireland, and El Paso, Texas | February 6, 2017 |
| 54 | "Valet Area" | Nathaniel Bar-Jonah; Rodney Alcala | February 2, 2017 |
| 53 | "Live at The Orpheum" | The LA Ripper; Greystone Mansion murders | January 26, 2017 |
| Minisode | "MFM Minisode 16" | Two New Zealand hometown murders; The dirty secret behind Kip's Tacos | January 23, 2017 |
| 52 | "Bonjour, Internet!" | Luka Magnotta; The creation of the Amber alert | January 19, 2017 |
| Minisode | "MFM Minisode 15" | Sonoma's Ramon Salcido; Mexican wrestler La Dama del Silencio; The Catman Of Greenock | January 16, 2017 |
| 51 | "A Bit of Oblivion" | Survival story of Jennifer Holliday; The story behind Megan's Law | January 12, 2017 |
| Minisode | "MFM Minisode 14" | Next door murderers; Young "Bonnie and Clyde" types; Twisted morticians | January 9, 2017 |
| 50 | "The Golden Anniversary Episode" | Somerton Man; 1984 bioterror attack by followers of the Bhagwan Shree Rajneesh | January 5, 2017 |
| 49 | "The Great Guy Law-Time New Years Spectacular" | Guy Branum answers hosts' questions about the justice system and the law | December 29, 2016 |
| 48 | "An Albert Fish Production" | Starved Rock State Park murders; Kidnapping of Sherri Papini | December 22, 2016 |
| Minisode | "MFM Minisode 13" | Hometown stories; Real estate advice | December 19, 2016 |
| 47 | "Live at The Bell House" | Richard Cottingham; Murder of Imette St. Guillen; Murder of Dee Dee Blanchard; Local stories from the hosts of The Last Podcast on the Left | December 15, 2016 |
| 46 | "Skippers Unite!" | Leslie Allen Williams; Israel Keyes | December 8, 2016 |
| Minisode | "MFM Minisode 12" | Tale by a 13-year-old; A listener's Ted Bundy connection | December 5, 2016 |
| 45 | "Funky Diva" | John Bingham, 7th Earl of Lucan; Summerhill Road Murders | December 1, 2016 |
| 44 | "Live from the Chicago Podcast Festival" | Fort Worth Missing Trio; John Wayne Gacy | November 23, 2016 |
| Minisode | "MFM Minisode 11" | Lust; Drugs; Murder; Iceland | November 21, 2016 |
| 43 | "In Arrears" | Murder–suicide at the International Dunes Hotel; Chicago Tylenol murders | November 17, 2016 |
| 42 | "Abject Failure" | Todd Kohlhepp | November 10, 2016 |
| 41 | "Live from EW Popfest" | Hollywood; Lana Turner and the homicide of Johnny Stompanato; The Wasp Woman, Susan Cabot | November 3, 2016 |
| Minisode | "MFM Minisode 10" | Family murder in New Mexico; Spooky sleepover tale | October 31, 2016 |
| 40 | "Squad Gourds" | "My Way" killings; Murder of Scott Amedure | October 27, 2016 |
| Minisode | "MFM Minisode 9" | Henry Lee Lucas; Mark Winger; Feigned love of camping, a dead body, and a couch covered in blood | October 24, 2016 |
| 39 | "Kind of Loco" | Charles Albright; Ed Kemper | October 20, 2016 |
| 38 | "Sidebar Nation" | Gerald Robinson; 2016 Gage Park stabbings | October 13, 2016 |
| Minisode | "MFM Minisode 8" | Hometown murders | October 10, 2016 |
| 37 | "Liminal Space" | Murder of Ruth Thalia Sayas; Dorothea Puente | October 6, 2016 |
| 36 | "Live from LA Podcast Festival" | Trailside Killer; Wineville Chicken Coop Murders; Mark Errin Rust | September 29, 2016 |
| Minisode | "MFM Minisode 7" | "Bermuda Triangle Of Murder" in Kenosha, Wisconsin; House Hunters: Quadruple Homicide Edition; A prep school Slender Man murder | September 26, 2016 |
| 35 | "A Small Foreign Faction" | Death of JonBenét Ramsey and the pop culture that has risen around the event | September 22, 2016 |
| 34 | "Thirty Let the Bodies Hit the Four" | Richard Speck; Martin Bryant; Port Arthur massacre | September 14, 2016 |
| Minisode | "MFM Minisode 6" | Texarkana Moonlight Murders; Sasebo slashing | September 13, 2016 |
| 33 | "What About Mimi?" | Michigan murders; Survival of Jennifer Morey | September 8, 2016 |
| Minisode | "MFM Minisode 5" | Hexing witch beatdown; Shouting match with a serial killer; Unfortunate back rubs; Recent unsolved river murder mystery | September 5, 2016 |
| 32 | "Just The 32 Of Us" | The life and death of pop singer Selena; Zankou Chicken murders | September 1, 2016 |
| Minisode | "MFM Minisode 4" | Poisoned milkshake; Field full of wheat and blood; "Cliche reckless teenager"; Slumber party gone wrong | August 30, 2016 |
| 31 | "Namaste Sexy" | Lululemon murder; Barbara Ann Hackmann Taylor; The Doe Network; Local story by comedian Guy Branum | August 25, 2016 |
| Minisode | "MFM Minisode 3" | Prophetic child; Heroic dog; Easter Sunday massacre | August 22, 2016 |
| 30 | "The F*ck Word Murder Mystery Show" | Cary Stayner and the Yosemite murders; Christian Gerhartsreiter | August 18, 2016 |
| 29 | "Twenty-Nein" | John List; Warriena Tagpuno Wright; Local story by comedian Matt McCarthy | August 11, 2016 |
| 28 | "I 28 His Liver With Some Fava Beans and A Nice Chianti" | Durham family murders; Terry Jo Duperrault | August 4, 2016 |
| 27 | "Your Hometown Murder Email Round-Up" | Listener hometown murders | July 28, 2016 |
| 26 | "Twenty Six Six Six" | Mary Bell; Murder of Lisa Steinberg; Listener gifts | July 21, 2016 |
| 25 | "Twenty Knives" | Christopher Dorner shootings and manhunt; Cheshire murders | July 14, 2016 |
| 24 | "...And Twenty Justice Four All" | Murder of Polly Klaas; Murder of Kitty Genovese | July 7, 2016 |
| 23 | "Making A Twenty-Thirderer" | Alexander Pichushkin; Attempted murder of Sarah Brady by Katie Smith | June 29, 2016 |
| 22 | "The Girls with the Episode Twenty Two" | Sawney Bean legend; Princes in the Tower | June 27, 2016 |
| 21 | "Because 7 8 9" | Cleveland Elementary School shooting; Jane Toppan | June 16, 2016 |
| 20 | "20/20" | Brock Turner; Richard Ramirez; Bain family murders | June 9, 2016 |
| 19 | "Nineteen Kills and Counting" | Anders Behring Breivik; Freeway Phantom | June 2, 2016 |
| 18 | "Investigateighteen Discovery" | Mary Vincent, a would-be victim of Lawrence Singleton; Franklin Delano Floyd | May 27, 2016 |
| Minisode | "MFM Minisode 2" | Hometown murders | May 26, 2016 |
| 17 | "SE7ENteen" | Murder of 13-year-old Jennifer Moore in Novato, California; Chris Benoit double-murder and suicide | May 19, 2016 |
| 16 | "Blood Murder Sixteen Magik" | The Family; Murder of Chandra Levy; Murder of Sylvia Likens.; Local story from comedian Kara Klenk. | May 13, 2016 |
| 15 | "Definitely Not Episode 16" | Harold Shipman; Setagaya family murder | May 5, 2016 |
| 14 | "You Sexy Motherfourteen" | Joseph Naso; Death of Sherrice Iverson | April 28, 2016 |
| 13 | "Thirteen Going On Murdy" | The Preppie murder; Keddie murders | April 21, 2016 |
| 12 | "Our Bodies, Our Twelves" | David Rothenburg; Diane Downs | April 13, 2016 |
| 11 | "What the Helleven?" | Vince Li; Albert Fish | April 7, 2016 |
| 10 | "Murderous TENdencies" | Who put Bella in the Wych Elm?; Richard Chase the Vampire of Sacramento | April 1, 2016 |
| Minisode | "MFM Minisode 1" | Hometown submissions | March 30, 2016 |
| 9 | "Color Me Nine" | Paul Bateson; Josh Phillips | March 25, 2016 |
| 8 | "Eight Is Enough Murders" | Cursed movies; Death of Rebecca Zahau; Local story from Georgia's husband Vince Averill | March 17, 2016 |
| 7 | "Seven Murders in Heaven" | Black Dahlia; Death of Elisa Lam; Local story by Dining With Doug & Karen co-host Karen Anderson | March 11, 2016 |
| 6 | "Stay Sixy" | Alex and Derek King; Richardson family murders; TV shows The People v. O. J. Simpson and Autopsy | February 23, 2016 |
| 5 | "Five Favorite Murders" | LA Freeway Killers of the 70s; Murder of Martha Moxley | February 16, 2016 |
| 4 | "Go Forth and Murder" | Making a Murderer theories; Cropsey; Murder of Michele Wallace; Listener hometowns about Murder of Adam Walsh and Kidnapping of Colleen Stan; Petaluma Tickler | February 11, 2016 |
| 3 | "Our Favorite Thirder" | Cameron Todd Willingham arson case; Oakland County Child Killer; Local story from We Watch Wrestling podcast co-host Tom Sibley | January 31, 2016 |
| 2 | "My Second Best Murder" | Paul Bernardo and Karla Homolka; Assassination of Robert F. Kennedy; Local story by Alie Ward about the murder of Kirsten Costas | January 22, 2016 |
| 1 | "My Firstest Murder" | Car accidents; Death of JonBenét Ramsey; East Area Rapist; Local story from Feral Audio founder, Dustin Martian. | January 13, 2016 |

== See also ==
- List of My Favorite Murder live shows
