= List of My Favorite Murder live shows =

My Favorite Murder is an American true crime comedy podcast hosted by Karen Kilgariff and Georgia Hardstark. Kilgariff and Hardstark have been performing My Favorite Murder Live shows since September 24, 2016.

== List ==
Date	City	Venue	Released Episode	Content
November 28, 2019	London, England	Evintim Apollo	TBA	TBA
November 27, 2019	London, England	Eventim Apollo	199	Karen covered Dr. Thomas Neill Cream and Georgia covered the Enfield Poltergeist
November 25, 2019	Dublin, Ireland	Bord Gais Energy Theatre	198	Georgia covered Dorcas "Darkey" Kelly and Karen covered "Lying Eye"s Sharon Collins
November 24, 2019	Dublin, Ireland	Bord Gais Energy Theatre	TBA	TBA
November 23, 2019	Glasgow, Scotland	Glasgow Theatre Royal	TBA	TBA
November 22, 2019	Manchester, England	Manchester Apollo Theatre	TBA	TBA
November 1–2, 2019	Santa Barbara, CA	Arlington Theater	195	Georgia covered the disappearance of the Salomon Family and Karen covered Thor Nis Christianson
May 4, 2019	Dallas, TX	Toyota Music Factory in Irving	187	Karen and Georgia covered the Texas Cheerleader Mom Murder Plot and the case of Vicky Lyons
April 17, 2019	Louisville, KY	W.L. Lyons Brown Theatre	173	The Torture House of 1924 and the murder of Marlene Oakes.
April 6, 2019	Denver, CO	Bellco Theatre	171	The murder of Adolph Coors III and the Colorado Cannibal.
March 24, 2019	Omaha, NE	Orpheum Theater	208	The murders of John Sheedy and Cari Farver
March 23, 2019	Des Moines, IA	Civic Center	168	Tracey Richter and the Villisca Axe Murders.
March 17, 2019	Indianapolis, IN	Old National Centre	165	Karen and Georgia cover the Richmond Hill explosion and the murder of Marjorie Jackson.
February 24, 2019	Toronto, ON	Sony Centre	202	Karen covered the Ant Hill Cult and Georgia covered the murder of Renee Sweeney
February 23, 2019	Toronto, ON	Sony Centre	TBA	TBA
February 22, 2019	Detroit, MI	Fox Theatre	277	The Rattle Run Church murder and the murder of Tina Biggar.
February 8, 2019	Honolulu, HI	Blaisdell Concert Hall	161	Karen and Georgia cover the murder of Yvonne Mathison and the Maui Yoga Twin case.
February 1, 2019	Baltimore, MD	Lyric Theatre	159	Karen and Georgia cover the murder of Carolyn Wasilewski and the Baltimore Plot.
January 11, 2019	San Diego, CA	Civic Theatre	157	The Torrey Pines Beach Murders and the Rose Petal Murder.
January 10, 2019	San Diego, CA	Civic Theatre	262	The San Diego Tank Rampage and the murder of Don Hardin.
November 10, 2018	Austin, TX	University of Texas PAC (Bass Hall)	147	Robert Elmer Kleason and the murder of Steven Robards
November 9, 2018	Atlanta, GA	Fox Theatre	203	The kidnapping of Barbara Mackie and the Barbie Bandits
October 31, 2018	Los Angeles, CA	Microsoft Theater	145	The satanic panic of McMartin Pre-School and the Mannequin at the Carnival
October 28, 2018	San Francisco, CA	Davies Symphony Hall	214	The murder of Cecelia Bowers and the Alcatraz escape of 1962
October 27, 2018	Oakland, CA	Paramount Theatre	223	Zodiac Killer suspects and the murder of Stephanie Bryan
October 26, 2018	Sacramento, CA	Community Center Theatre	148	Karen and Georgia cover attempted assassin Squeaky Fromme and the Lodi Haystack Murder. Plus surprise guest Paul Holes.
October 21, 2018	Vancouver, BC	Queen Elizabeth Theatre	151	The Abbottsford Killer and the Salish Sea human foot discoveries,
October 20, 2018 (Late Show)	Seattle, WA	Paramount Theatre	TBA	TBA
October 20, 2018	Seattle, WA	Paramount Theatre	TBA	Karen and Georgia covered Gary Ridgway, the Green River Killer.
October 19, 2018	Portland, OR	Arlene Schnitzer Concert Hall	229	Holy Rollers/The Brides of Christ Cult and Beverly Allan and Larry Peyton
October 18, 2018	Portland, OR	Arlene Schnitzer Concert Hall	273	Christian Longo and the KOIN tower hostage situation.
October 7, 2018	Medford, MA	Chevalier Theatre	220	Karen covered the Great Boston Fire of 1872 and Georgia covered the murder of Mary-Lou Arruda.
October 6, 2018 (Late Show)	Medford, MA	Chevalier Theatre	TBA	TBA
October 6, 2018	Medford, MA	Chevalier Theatre	144	Georgia covered the murder of George Parkman and Karen covered the Great Molasses Flood.
October 5, 2018	Brooklyn, NY	Kings Theatre	TBA	Karen covered church leader DeVernon LaGrand and Georgia covered deaths at Coney Island.
October 4, 2018	New York, NY	Beacon Theatre	TBA	Georgia covered the Witch of Staten Island and Karen covered the Clam Chowder Murder.
September 22, 2018	Charlotte, NC	Belk Theatre	227	Karen covered serial killer Marcus Shrader, a Marine stationed at Marine Corps Base Camp Lejeune in Jacksonville, NC. Georgia covered Blanche Taylor Moore, the Black Widow of Alamance County, NC. There were two hometown stories, Marcus Kragness of Concord, NC and the death of Zahra Baker, a child from Hickory, NC.
September 21, 2018	North Charleston, SC	North Charleston PAC	TBA	TBA
September 20, 2018	Durham, NC	Durham Performing Arts Center	142	The Lawson family murders and the Bitter Blood murders.
May 17, 2018	Glasgow Scotland	O2 Academy	152	Georgia discusses the Burke and Hare murders and Karen covers serial killer Peter Tobin/Bible John.
May 16, 2018	Amsterdam, Netherlands	De Meervaart	232	Karen covers Dutch serial killer Willem van Eijk; Georgia discusses Elsje Christiaens, a Danish woman who murdered her landlady in Amsterdam.
May 13, 2018	Manchester, England	Albert Hall	128	Georgia and Karen cover Mary Ann Britland, female serial killer and first woman to be hanged at Strangeways Prison, and Trevor Hardy, the Beast of Manchester.
May 12, 2018	London, England	Hammersmith Apollo	TBA	Karen and Georgia cover Jack the Ripper and John George Haigh, the acid bath murderer.
May 11, 2018	Stockholm, Sweden	Chinateatern	131	Georgia and Karen cover the case of Thomas Quick and murderer Juha Valjakkala.
May 9, 2018	Oslo, Norway	Folketeatret	178	Georgia and Karen cover the Isdal woman and the Black Metal murders
May 8, 2018	Dublin, Ireland	Vicar Street	276	Georgia and Karen covered Colin Howell and Catherine Nevin the "Black Widow"
May 7, 2018	Dublin, Ireland	Vicar Street	123	Georgia and Karen cover the Stoneybatter Strangler, or Billy in the Bowl, and the murder of Mary Gough.
March 16, 2018	Los Angeles, CA	Orpheum Theatre	120	Karen and Georgia cover LA crime journalist Agness Underwood and the Los Feliz Murder Mansion.
February 16, 2018	Salt Lake City, UT	Kingsbury Hall	TBA/254	Karen covers The Donner Party in the second half of a quilt episode.
February 15, 2018	Salt Lake City, UT	Kingsbury Hall	113	Karen and Georgia cover killer Ronnie Lee Gardner and the Salt Lake City Public Library hostage incident.
February 3, 2018	Columbus, OH	Palace Theatre	110	Karen and Georgia cover serial killer Donald Harvey and the mystery of the Circleville Letter Writer.
February 2, 2018	Cleveland, OH	Connor Palace	134	Georgia and Karen cover Ed Edwards and the Kirtland cult murders.
January 28, 2018	Nashville, TN	Andrew Jackson Hall	No	Georgia and Karen covered the murders of David "Stringbean" Akeman and Kevin Hughes.
January 27, 2018	Atlanta, GA	Cobb Energy Performing Arts Centre	217	Georgia and Karen talked about the serial killer Anjette Lyles and haunted Lake Lanier.
January 26, 2018	New Orleans, LA	Orpheum Theatre	No	Georgia and Karen cover the case of child sex abuse from Hosanna Church of Ponchatoula, Louisiana and the murders of Eric and Pam Ellender.
January 21, 2018	Phoenix, AZ	Celebrity Theatre	107	Karen and Georgia cover killers Winnie Ruth Judd and Jodi Arias.
January 20, 2018	Las Vegas, NV	Red Rock Casino	138	Georgia and Karen discuss the murders of Ted Binion and Gerard Soules.
December 9, 2017 (Late Show)	Kansas City, MO	Arvest Bank Theatre	No	
December 9, 2017	Kansas City, MO	Arvest Bank Theatre	191	The Meeks Family Murder and the Hotel President haunting
December 8, 2017	St. Louis, MO	Powell Symphony Hall	No	
November 12, 2017	Dallas, TX	Majestic Theatre	No	
November 11, 2017 (Late Show)	Dallas, TX	Majestic Theatre	No	
November 11, 2017	Dallas, TX	Majestic Theatre	101	Karen and Georgia cover the mysterious deaths and suicides surrounding cult leader Terri Hoffman, and the "Black Widow" Sandra Bridewell.
November 10, 2017	Houston, TX	Revention Music Center	No	
November 5, 2017	Fort Lauderdale, FL	Au-Rene Theater	No	
November 4, 2017	Orlando, FL	Hard Rock	96	Karen and Georgia cover killers Aileen Wuornos and Judy Buenoano.
November 3, 2017	Tampa, FL	Tampa Theatre	180	Serial killers Oscar Ray Bolin and Bobby Joe Long.
October 21, 2017	Madison, WI	Orpheum Theater	No	
October 20, 2017	Madison, WI	Orpheum Theater	No	
October 19, 2017	Minneapolis, MN	Northrop Auditorium, University of Minnesota	No	Georgia & Karen cover the Glensheen Mansion Murders and Dr. Arnold Axilrod.
October 18, 2017	Minneapolis, MN	Northrop Auditorium, University of Minnesota	No	Georgia & Karen cover the Versace murders and the murder of Carol Thompson.
October 14, 2017	Anaheim, CA	City National Grove	93	Karen and Georgia cover the stories of Daniel Wozniak and the Disneyland deaths.
October 13, 2017 (Late Show)	San Diego, CA	Balboa Theatre	No	
October 13, 2017	San Diego, CA	Balboa Theatre	103	This week Karen and Georgia cover the Betty Broderick case and the Heaven's Gate Cult.
September 30, 2017	Toronto, ON	Sony Centre	91	Georgia spoke about the murder of Lynn Harper and Karen covered Paul Bernardo and Karla Homolka. Hometown murder was that of Samantha Collins of Bracebridge, ON.
September 29, 2017 (Late Show)	Detroit, MI	The Fillmore	256	Karen and Georgia cover the death of Robin Boes and murderer Lowell Amos.
September 29, 2017	Detroit, MI	The Fillmore	No	
September 12, 2017	Sydney, Australia	Sydney Opera House	No	
September 11, 2017	Newtown, Australia	Enmore Theatre	86	Georgia and Karen discuss the "Melbourne incident" and cover serial killer Auntie Thally and the Shark Arm case.
September 9, 2017	Melbourne, Australia	Comedy Theatre	88	Karen and Georgia cover serial killers Ivan Milat and The Brownout Strangler.
September 8, 2017	Melbourne, Australia	Comedy Theatre	No	Georgia and Karen talked about the murder of Jill Meagher and the Walsh Street police shootings. This is also the show that was disrupted by an audience member.
September 6, 2017	Auckland, NZ	Bruce Mason Centre	No	Georgia covered Mark Lundy and Karen told the story of resistance fighter Nancy Wake, code named "The White Mouse"
September 4, 2017	Brisbane, Australia	The Tivoli	No	
August 26, 2017	Boulder, CO	Boulder Theatre	85	Karen and Georgia cover the killer John Agrue and Theodore Edward Coneys, the Spiderman of Denver.
August 25, 2017	Denver, CO	Paramount Denver	No	
July 2017	Baltimore, MD	The Rams Head Live	80	Karen and Georgia cover the killers Joe Palczynski and Joseph Kallinger.
July 2017	Glenside, PA	The Keswick Theatre	77	Karen and Georgia cover the killers Gary Heidnik and Edward Gingerich.
April 19, 2017	Austin, TX	Moontower Comedy Festival	70	Karen and Georgia cover the infamous Yogurt Shop Murders and America's ‘first’ serial killer, the Servant Girl Annihilator.
April 7, 2017	Milwaukee, WI	Riverside Theater	181	Karen and Georgia cover the Butcher of Plainfield Ed Gein and David Spanbauer.
April 6, 2017	Indianapolis, IN	The Egyptian Room	67	Karen and Georgia cover serial killers Belle Gunness and Herb Baumeister.
March 26, 2017	Portland, OR	Revolution Hall	64	Karen and Georgia cover the terrible Bobby Jack Fowler and the mysterious Cline Falls Hatchet Attack.
March 25, 2017 (Late show)	Portland, OR	Revolution Hall	201	William Scott Smith and Crater Lake Mysteries
March 25, 2017	Portland, OR	Revolution Hall	No	I-5 Killer and the Onion Man
March 4, 2017	New York, NY	Beacon Theatre	No	Karen and Georgia cover the Lizzie Halliday and the "Harlem Kevorkian" cases.
March 3, 2017 (Late Show)	Boston, MA	The Wilbur	No	Georgia and Karen cover Jesse Pomeroy and Lewis Lent.
March 3, 2017	Boston, MA	The Wilbur	59	Karen and Georgia cover the Molly Bish case and a serial killer who called himself The Giggler!
February 19, 2017	Seattle, WA	The Neptune	61	Karen and Georgia cover the murder of punk singer Mia Zapata and serial killer Ted Bundy.
February 18, 2017	Vancouver, BC	Vogue Theatre	No	Georgia and Karen cover serial killers Cody Legebokoff and Clifford Olson. Hometown murders included Lindsay Buziak, Tyler Myers of Salmon Arm, and the Janzen family triple murder-suicide.
February 17, 2017	Oakland, CA	Fox Theater	57	Karen and Georgia cover about the Speed Freak Killers and the earthquake-fearing Herbert Mullin.
January 21, 2017	Los Angeles, CA	The Orpheum	53	Karen and Georgia tell the sordid tales of the LA Ripper and the Greystone Mansion Murders. Then, Dave Anthony and Gareth Reynolds from The Dollop stop by to tell their ‘hometown’ stories.
December 11, 2016	Brooklyn, NY	The Bell House	47	Karen and Georgia tell the stories of New York's Torso Killer and the murder of Imette St. Guillen. Plus guest Jamie Lee shares the murder of Dee Dee Blanchard and the boys from The Last Podcast on the Left tell their hometown murders.
November 19, 2016	Chicago, IL	Chicago Podcast Festival	44	Karen and Georgia are live at the Chicago Podcast Festival talking about the Fort Worth Three kidnapping and Chicago's very own John Wayne Gacy.
October 30, 2016	Los Angeles, CA	EW Popfest	41	Karen and Georgia share Hollywood tales of murder including Lana Turner’s dark family secrets and the Wasp Woman, Susan Cabot. Plus a hometown murder picked right from the studio audience!
September 24, 2016	Los Angeles, CA	LA Podcast Festival	36	Karen, Georgia and comedian/The Dollop co-host Dave Anthony talk about the Trailside Killer, the Wineville Chicken Coop Murders, and Australian murderer Mark Errin Rust.

== See also ==
- List of My Favorite Murder episodes
