= Podcast News =

- The Simpsons episode
- Episode no.: Season 32; Episode 6
- Directed by: Matthew Faughnan
- Written by: David X. Cohen
- Production code: ZABF22
- Original air date: November 15, 2020

Guest appearances
- Morgan Fairchild as Vivienne St. Charmaine; Stellan Skarsgård as himself; Christine Nangle as Tabitha Shingle

Episode chronology
← Previous "The 7 Beer Itch"	Next → "Three Dreams Denied"
- The Simpsons season 32

"Podcast News" is the sixth episode of the thirty-second season of the American animated television series The Simpsons. It originally aired on the Fox network in the United States on November 15, 2020. In the episode, Grampa Simpson is accused of murdering his girlfriend, and Kent Brockman creates a podcast about it. Brockman's podcast is able to convince the town that Grampa was guilty of the crime, including Grampa himself, who confesses to the police. However, after the discovery that Grampa's girlfriend is still alive, he is exonerated and set free.

"Podcast News" was directed by Matthew Faughnan and written by David X. Cohen. The episode marked the first time that Cohen had written for the series since 1998. The episode guest stars Morgan Fairchild as Grampa's girlfriend, Christine Nangle as Tabitha Shingle, and Stellan Skarsgård as himself. Series cast member Yeardley Smith, who voices Lisa Simpson, also makes an appearance as herself in the episode. "Podcast News" features numerous references to real-life podcasts, including Doughboys, Serial, and My Favorite Murder. The title of the episode is a reference to the film Broadcast News.

In its original broadcast, "Podcast News" was watched live in the United States by 3.50 million viewers. It generally received positive reviews from television critics.

The episode was dedicated in memory of Alex Trebek, who died on November 8, 2020.

== Plot ==
While Marge and Lisa become addicted to true crime podcasts, Homer and Bart go to visit Grampa at the Springfield Retirement Castle and find that he has a new girlfriend named Vivienne St. Charmaine, a former TV star.

Later, during a romantic getaway cruise, Vivienne is reported dead from a fall aboard the cruise ship, and Grampa, who does not remember what happened, is the top suspect. After noticing the popularity of podcasts in Springfield, Kent Brockman decides to create a podcast called Guilty Grampa about the incident in order to stay relevant. The podcast convinces Springfield, the Simpson family, and even Grampa himself that he is guilty of the crime.

Kent discovers that Vivienne had left all her money to Grampa in her life insurance policy, giving him a motive for murder. Grampa confesses and gets locked away in jail, though later, Dr. Hibbert reveals to the Simpsons that Vivienne is alive: he had been tracking both hers and Grampa's movements via GPS chips the two had swallowed during a colonoscopy, and she had faked her death and fled to a Mexican resort. Hibbert and the Simpsons then confront Kent with the information ahead of the Guilty Grampa live finale, and successfully pressure him to reveal the truth. Though Grampa is released from prison, he is upset as he believed that Vivienne was the last love of his life.

In the final scene, Grampa encounters Vivienne, who reminds him that he was supposed to meet her in Mexico with the insurance money as they had earlier planned. The pair decide to hide out unnoticed together in the Springfield Retirement Castle until the publicity of the case dies down.

== Production ==
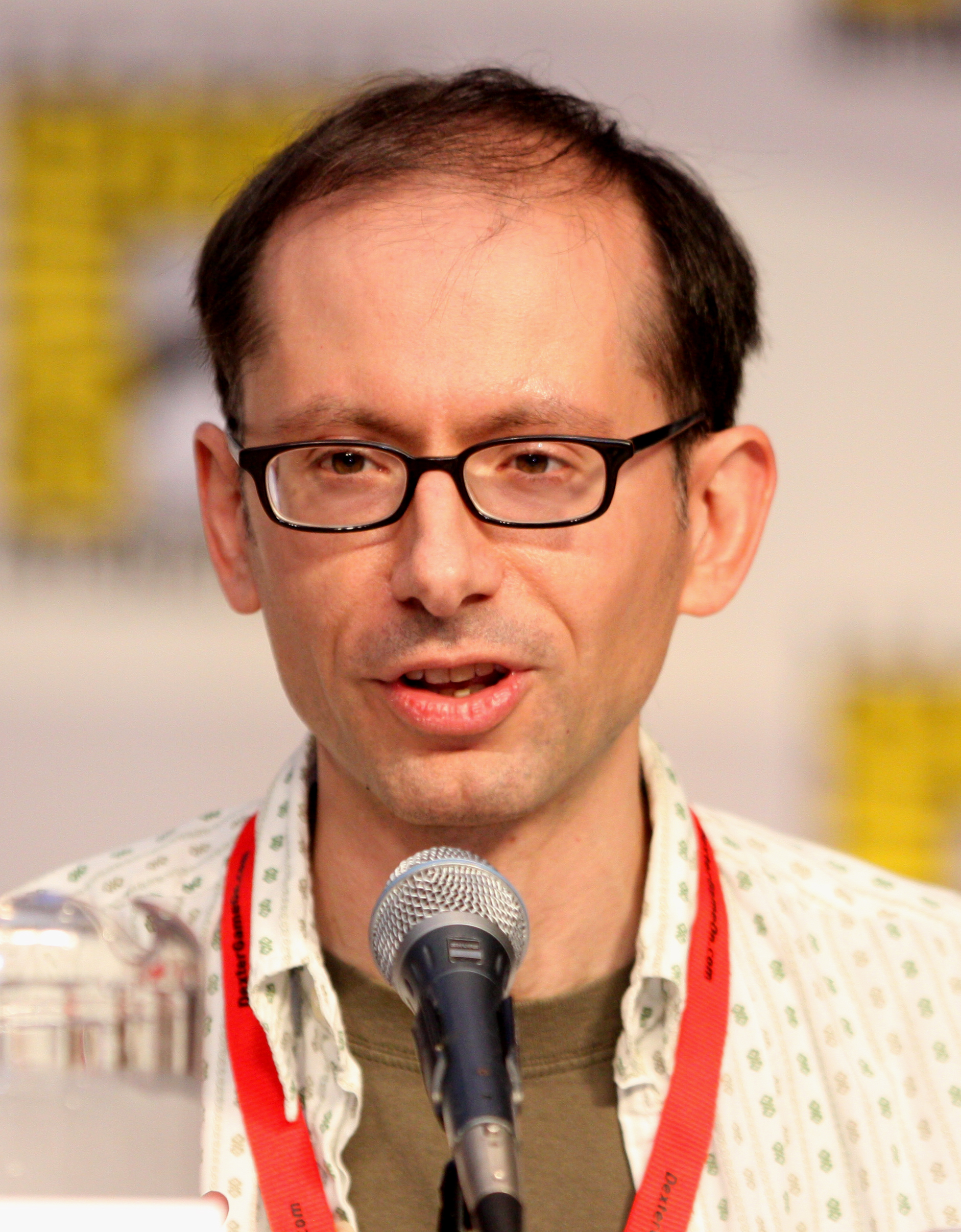
"Podcast News" was the first episode that David X. Cohen had written for The Simpsons since 1998.

=== Writing ===
"Podcast News" was directed by Matthew Faughnan and written by David X. Cohen. The episode marked the first time that Cohen had written an episode of the series since 1998, when he wrote the "Starship Poopers" segment of "Treehouse of Horror IX."

=== Guest appearances ===
The episode featured multiple guest appearances. Actress Morgan Fairchild appeared in the episode as Grampa's girlfriend Vivienne St. Charmaine. Christine Nangle, a writer for The Simpsons, appeared as podcaster Tabitha Shingle. Swedish actor Stellan Skarsgård appeared as himself. Series regular Yeardley Smith, who voices Lisa Simpson, also appeared in the episode as herself, host of the podcast Small Town Dicks. She is the third regular cast member to appear in animated form, the first being Harry Shearer, who guest starred as Derek Smalls in the episode "The Otto Show", and the second being Dan Castellaneta, who guest starred as himself in the episodes "Homer Simpson, This Is Your Wife" and "He Loves to Fly and He D'ohs".

==== Cut appearances ====
Podcaster and sports analyst Bill Simmons was originally scheduled to have a guest appearance in the episode as himself, however, he never appeared in the episode.

Singer and songwriter Billie Eilish was originally supposed to sing the intro music to the Guilty Grampa podcast, however, her appearance was cut for time, and the staff of the show never reached out to her about the part.

=== Promotion ===
In 2020, Fox released eight promotional pictures from the episode.

== Cultural references ==
The title of the episode is an allusion to the 1987 film Broadcast News, which was written, produced and directed by James L. Brooks, one of the developers of The Simpsons.

The restaurant in the episode, Streami's, features the hosts of Matt Selman's favorite podcasts, including Michael Lombardi from The GM Shuffle, Karina Longworth from You Must Remember This, and Nick Wiger and Mike Mitchell of Doughboys. Additionally, the wall of the restaurant features caricatures of Desus Nice and The Kid Mero of Bodega Boys, Sarah Koenig of Serial, Dan Carlin of Hardcore History, and Karen Kilgariff and Georgia Hardstark of My Favorite Murder.

"Podcast News" was dedicated to Alex Trebek, the longtime host of Jeopardy! who died on November 8, 2020, a week before the episode's first airing.

== Reception ==
"Podcast News" originally aired on the Fox network on November 15, 2020, from 8:00 to 8:31 p.m. In the United States, the episode was watched live by 3.50 million viewers.

=== Critical response ===
Tony Sokol with Den of Geek said, "'Podcast News,' named for the comedy drama Broadcast News, is a good parody of the podcast craze. In spite of its similarity to 'Bad Homer,' the episode is very current, a little tricky, and comes at us from a different kind of angle. The Simpsons have given us stories about Abe’s shady pasts. He's been around almost longer than anyone but Monty Burns, so he has a lot more past to shade. It's to his credit, Abe can bear the weight of the blame, especially at his age. The most frightening concept of the episode, however, is the level of personal information can be gleaned from colonoscopy technology. Filled with singularly funny one liners, 'Podcast News' manages to keep a sense of tension throughout, and ends on a satisfying morally ambiguous note." He also gave the episode four out of five stars.

Jesse Bereta of Bubbleblabber gave the episode an 8.5 out of 10. He highlighted the murder mystery theme and the appearance of Yeardley Smith as herself. He thought that writer David X. Cohen "exceeded the expectations," and the episode was reminiscent of episodes from the 1990s.
