= Herb Baumeister =

American serial killer (1947–1996)

- Baumeister's 1986 mugshot
- Born: Herbert Richard Baumeister; April 7, 1947; Indianapolis, Indiana, U.S.
- Died: July 3, 1996 (aged 49); Pinery Provincial Park, Ontario, Canada
- Cause of death: Suicide by gunshot
- Spouse: Juliana Saiter (m. 1971)
- Children: 3
- Status: Deceased

Details
- Victims: 11–23+
- Span of crimes: 1980–1995
- Country: United States
- States: Indiana (confirmed); Ohio (suspected)
- Date apprehended: N/A

Herbert Richard Baumeister (April 7, 1947 – July 3, 1996) was a businessman and alleged serial killer from the United States, who came under suspicion of murdering over a dozen men in the early-to-mid 1990s, most of whom were last seen at gay bars in central Indiana. Police ultimately identified the remains of eleven men on Baumeister's property. He died by suicide after a warrant was issued for his arrest. Since his death, he has come under suspicion for the murders of twelve other men along Interstate 70 in Indiana and Ohio, which occurred from the early 1980s to the early 1990s.

== Early life ==
Herb Baumeister was born in Indianapolis on April 7, 1947, the oldest of four children born to anesthesiologist Dr. Herbert Eugene Baumeister (d. November 12, 1986) and Elizabeth Baumeister (née Schmidt; d. April 7, 2013).

Baumeister's childhood was reportedly normal, but he began exhibiting antisocial behavior by the onset of adolescence. Friends later recalled his urophilia and how he used to "ponder what it would be like to taste human urine". He also enjoyed urinating on teachers' desks and playing with dead animals. In his teens, Baumeister's behavior caused his father to have him submit to mental examinations. He was subsequently diagnosed with paranoid schizophrenia and antisocial personality disorder, but did not receive further psychiatric treatment.

In 1965, Baumeister attended Indiana University for a semester before dropping out, but returned in 1967. In 1972, he attended a semester at Butler University. As an adult he drifted through a series of jobs, marked by a strong work ethic but also by increasingly bizarre behavior.

Baumeister married Juliana "Julie" Saiter in November 1971 in a Methodist ceremony. The couple had three children. Saiter later said that they had been sexually intimate only six times in over twenty-five years of marriage, and that she never saw her husband nude. Six months after his marriage, Baumeister was committed to a psychiatric hospital by his father for two months; his wife said he was "hurting and needed help." Baumeister eventually founded the successful Sav-A-Lot thrift store chain in Indianapolis in 1988.

== Murders ==
=== I-70 Strangler ===
The I-70 Strangler is the nickname of an unidentified American serial killer who killed at least eleven young boys and adult men in Indiana and Ohio between June 1980 and October 1991, dumping their bodies near Interstate 70. The killer met his victims in popular gay bars and other similar establishments within a four-block radius in Indianapolis. All of the victims were later found naked or partially clothed near Interstate 70, often dumped in rivers, streams and ditches in the rural countryside. Each had been strangled to death.

Though officially unsolved, law enforcement officially named Baumeister as a prime suspect in the case in April 1999. According to investigators, bodies related to the Strangler case stopped being found in 1991 after Baumeister purchased Fox Hollow Farm, which he would use as a burial site for his subsequent victims.

- On June 16, 1980, the body of 15-year-old male prostitute Michael Sean Petree was discovered naked in Hamilton County, Indiana. Petree, who spent most of his time around Indianapolis' gay bars, was reported missing on June 7 but was observed three days later in different parts of the city riding along in a stranger's car. The cause of death was established as strangulation. No traces of drugs or alcohol were found in his blood.
- On July 21, 1982, the topless corpse of 22-year-old Maurice Allen Taylor was found in Hamilton County's Weasel Creek. While his cause of death was not sufficiently established, law enforcement suspected that he had been strangled. Taylor was a vagrant who lived in the boiler room of an Indianapolis apartment complex and offered sexual services around gay bars.
- On October 3, 1982, 14-year-old Delvoyd Lee Baker was found semi-nude near a river in Hamilton County. While investigating his death, authorities located witnesses who stated that Baker was last seen on the evening of October 2, in downtown Indianapolis climbing into a blue van driven by a young white man with a bushy moustache. Baker's parents told police that he had been riding his bike to the city on the night of his disappearance, from where he called home at 10:30 p.m. to inform them that he was going to be late because he wanted to go to the movies. It was later established that Baker had been cruising Indianapolis gay bars for the last three months and had been a victim of child sexual abuse.
- On May 28, 1983, 22-year-old Michael Andrew "Mick" Riley disappeared after visiting the Vogue Theater, an Indianapolis nightclub. He was last seen with an unidentified man, with whom he later left. In February 1998, an Indianapolis resident contacted police and claimed that Baumeister was the man last seen with Riley. Riley's nude body was later found in a ditch in Hancock County, southeast of Greenfield, on June 5. The autopsy determined that he had been strangled, with the perpetrator likely using a towel.
- On May 7, 1985, 17-year-old Eric Allen Roettger vanished. His shirtless body was found a few days later near a stream in rural Preble County, Ohio, east of Lewisburg. According to his parents, Roettger was planning to attend interviews for a summer job on the day of his disappearance, but did not attend any of them. His friends and relatives denied that he was gay, but later research indicated that Roettger had many acquaintances who were drug addicts or traffickers. Witnesses claimed that they had seen Roettger at a bus stop in the early morning of March 7, where he accepted a ride from a passing car. When found, Roettger had an apparent burn mark on his left shoulder and had been strangled with a rope.
- On August 15, 1986, the body of 29-year-old Michael Allen "Mike" Glenn, clad only in his underwear, was found in a ditch near Eaton, Ohio. He lived separately from his parents in a trailer park located on the outskirts of Indianapolis and worked as a handyman. The exact date of his disappearance was not established. Strangulation marks, possibly from a rope, were found on his neck. He was identified three years after his discovery with the help of fingerprinting.
- On October 15, 1987, at around 10 p.m., 21-year-old James Boyd Robbins Jr. went missing shortly after leaving his mother's home in Indianapolis and walking to the southern part of the city. Two days later, on October 17, his naked corpse was found in a ditch in rural Shelby County, south of Gwynneville. While investigating his murder, police located two witnesses who gave conflicting information; one claimed that they had seen a red Jeep Wrangler Renegade near the crime scene, while another said that the car was a Chevrolet Blazer.
- On August 12, 1989, the body of 26-year-old Steven Lynn Elliott, clad in his underwear, was found in Preble County, Ohio. He had been strangled, presumably with a rope. Elliot's father told police that when his son came out as gay in 1979, he then left the family household and became involved in prostitution, developing an alcohol addiction.
- On August 14, 1990, 32-year-old Clay Russell Boatman, a licensed practical nurse, disappeared after leaving his Richmond, Indiana, apartment to visit Our Place, a local gay bar. His body, showing signs of strangulation, was later found in a ditch by a group of children near Eaton, Ohio. When interviewed, Boatman's family denied that he was homosexual.
- On September 6, 1990, 18-year-old Thomas Ray Clevenger Jr. vanished; his semi-nude corpse was later found at an abandoned railroad track near Greenville, Ohio. Clevenger grew up in a poor neighborhood of Indianapolis, and shortly before his death he engaged in prostitution near gay bars to earn money, a fact denied by his mother and sister.
- On August 6, 1991, the body of 42-year-old Otto Gary Becker was found in a ditch next to a gravel road in rural Henry County, Indiana. While investigating his murder, police identified several witnesses who claimed to have seen Becker in a car with another male driving north on Interstate 465 near Indianapolis. The witnesses were taken to the police station and shown photographs of various criminals convicted of kidnapping and murder charges in the state, but none of them was matched to the alleged abductor.

=== Fox Hollow Farm killings ===
In May 1988, Baumeister purchased Fox Hollow Farm, an 18-acre property built in 1978 off 156th Street and the Monon Trail in Westfield, Indiana. In 1994, Baumeister's son had been playing in the family's wooded backyard when he found a complete, partially buried human skeleton. Baumeister explained to his family that it had been one of his father's dissecting skeletons; he had it stored in their garage before eventually burying it again in the garden.

On June 24, 1996, investigators recovered human bone fragments belonging to at least eleven people buried in the woods at Fox Hollow Farm. A new search on December 4, 2022, found one bone and identified twenty additional locations where more may be buried. Only ten victims whose killings were directly linked to Baumeister have been identified since the initial discovery. Three additional remains are still unidentified, although they are all believed to be male and to have been victims of homicide. The Hamilton County coroner's office have appealed to the public requesting anyone with missing family members from the mid-1980s to mid-1990s in the Indianapolis area to complete a DNA test in an effort to help identify the victims' remains. As of January 2024, forensic experts and the Hamilton County coroner's office continue working in an effort to identify nearly 10,000 portions of human remains recovered from an unknown number of victims at Fox Hollow Farm during the initial search of the farm in 1996 and the one bone from 2022.

- John Lee "Johnny" Bayer, aged 20, went missing on May 28, 1993.
- Jeffrey Allen "Jeff" Jones, aged 31, went missing on July 6, 1993.
- Richard Douglas Hamilton Jr., aged 20, went missing on July 31, 1993.
- Allen Lee Livingston, aged 27, went missing on August 6, 1993. His remains were recovered in the initial search of the farm in 1996 but remained unidentified until October 2023. He was the first victim to be identified following Hamilton County's new effort.
- Manuel Resendez, aged 34, last seen at a gay bar in downtown Indianapolis on August 6, 1993, the same date that Livingston disappeared. His identification was announced in January 2024.
- Daniel Thomas Halloran, aged 21 or 22, went missing sometime after March 1994. Identified in 2025 by forensic genetic genealogy.
- Steven Spurlin Hale, aged 28, went missing on April 1, 1994.
- Allen Wayne Broussard, aged 28, went missing on June 6, 1994.
- Roger Allen Goodlet, aged 33, went missing on July 22, 1994.
- Michael Frederick "Mike" Keirn, aged 45, last seen on March 31, 1995.

=== Additional victim ===
Authorities have publicly and posthumously linked the unsolved disappearance of 34-year-old Jerry Williams-Comer to Baumeister. Williams-Comer was last seen in Indianapolis on August 8, 1995. After his disappearance, his vehicle was found at Castleton Square Mall. As a young gay man, Williams-Comer fit the profile of Baumeister's victims, despite the fact that his remains were never recovered from Fox Hollow Farm.

== Identification, investigation and death ==
By the early 1990s, investigators with the Marion County Sheriff's Department and the Indianapolis Police Department began investigating the disappearances of gay men of similar age, height and weight in the Indianapolis area. In 1994, they were contacted by a man named Tony Harris, who claimed that a gay bar patron calling himself "Brian Smart" had likely killed Harris' friend, Roger Goodlet. Harris' suspicion was based on his own encounter with “Smart,” who had attempted to kill him with a pool hose during an erotic asphyxiation session inside his mansion after he had met him at the 501 Club, an Indianapolis gay bar. Harris eventually saw this man again in August 1995, following his car and noting his license plate number.

Upon identifying "Brian Smart" as Herb Baumeister, investigators informed him that he was a suspect in the disappearances and asked to search his house. Both Baumeister and his wife refused to allow a search of their property. By June 1996, however, Julie had become sufficiently frightened by her husband's erratic behavior that, after filing for divorce, she consented to a search. The search of the estate was conducted while Baumeister was on vacation. It turned up the remains of eleven men, eight of whom were identified.

With a warrant out for his arrest, Baumeister fled to Ontario, where he committed suicide at Pinery Provincial Park on Lake Huron by shooting himself in the head with a .357 Magnum handgun. Baumeister left a 3-page suicide note, written on yellow notepaper. He regretted messing up the park, he wrote, and felt bad about his broken marriage and failing business, but he did not mention the remains of his victims or admit to any crime. Baumeister described items on his trip, including his intention to kill himself in a different place, but seeing children there had changed his mind. His final meal was a peanut butter sandwich.

== Media coverage ==
The A&E television series Investigative Reports aired an episode about Baumeister titled The Secret Life of a Serial Killer in 1997. History featured the case in their Perfect Crimes series. The case was also featured on The Investigators on TruTV in 2008, Behind Mansion Walls on Investigation Discovery (ID), Paranormal Witness on Syfy in 2012, and Ghost Adventures in May 2014. An independent documentary film titled The Haunting of Fox Hollow Farm also explores the crimes and the possibility of hauntings on the grounds of Baumeister's former estate.

ID featured the case again on the series True Nightmares, in October 2015. The Crime Junkie podcast released an episode on Baumeister on March 4, 2018. The Monster Presents: Insomniac podcast released a two-part episode about the case on June 27, 2019. The All Things Comedy Mexican podcast Leyendas Legendarias released an episode where they talked about the case on October 14, 2020.

Georgia Hardstark covered the case on the podcast, My Favorite Murder, in episode 67, "Live at the Egyptian Room", during a live performance in Indianapolis. The podcast The Last Podcast on the Left covered Baumeister across a two-part series from March to April 2024. In 2025, Hulu released a four-part documentary about the case called, The Fox Hollow Murders: Playground of A Serial Killer, which promoted the theory that Baumeister had an accomplice. In June 2025, the Oxygen television series Unknown Serial Killers of America aired an episode about him entitled Herb Baumeister.

== See also ==
- I-70 Strangler – Unidentified American serial killer
- List of serial killers by number of victims
- List of serial killers in the United States
