= Unqualified =

Advice podcast

- Genre: Advice; comedy
- Language: English

Cast and voices
- Hosted by: Anna Faris

Technical specifications
- Audio format: Podcast (via streaming or downloadable MP3)

Publication
- Original release: November 23, 2015
- Updates: Weekly

Related
- Website: unqualified.com

Unqualified is an American advice podcast created and hosted by actress Anna Faris, featuring interviews with celebrities and cultural figures, followed by personal phonecalls to listeners asking for relationship and other advice. It was co-hosted by Faris's producer Sim Sarna until 2019. In 2017, Faris published a memoir under the same name as the podcast.

== Concept ==
Faris was inspired to create the podcast after listening to Serial. Explaining the evolution of the idea, she said:

I love to talk about relationships; that's all I want to talk about with my friends. And then I just thought, I kind of want a hobby, since [my husband] Chris has been shooting a lot. So I started asking around to some friends, and I asked this technical producer guy what equipment I should buy on Amazon. And I just started recording my friends when they would come over. And then with my dear friend Sim, we started flushing out the whole thing, which clearly there's still a lot more flushing out to do. It started out as a dinky hobby. It still is, for sure—we don't make any money. We would love to at some point, but we want to know a little bit more what we're doing first.

== Format ==
Each episode has two parts. In the first, a guest interview, Faris sometimes incorporates ad libbing or improvisational comedic sketches with the guest and posts questions centered on hypothetical relationship or dating situations. In some segments, she plays the character of Karen Sarducci, a disaffected studio executive with pronounced vocal fry who often makes reference to her privileged, brilliant sons, Milo (Paul Scheer) and Ventimiglia (based in name on actor Milo Ventimiglia), who are often vacationing abroad or at music festivals such as Coachella.

Former producer Sim Sarna used to participate in the second part of the show, which consisted of Sarna, Faris and the guest placing a phone call to a listener seeking "unqualified" advice on a relationship or personal dilemma. Since Sarna's leaving, the segment has been conducted primarily by Anna and guests.

=== Persons involved ===
==== Hosts and recurring persons ====
- Anna Faris – main host; also plays various characters during improvised segments.
- Michael Barrett – executive producer
- Rob Holysz – executive producer
- Jeph Porter – executive producer
- Kasper Bræin Selvig – producer

==== Production services ====
- Rabbit Grin Productions – Rabbit Grin Productions

=== Former host and producer ===
- Sim Sarna – former producer and co-host (no longer involved as of the March 7, 2019, episode).

==== Characters ====
- Karen Sarducci (Anna Faris) – an insouciant studio executive who interviews actor guests about potential film ideas
- Donavan (Sim Sarna) – Karen Sarducci's put-upon assistant, who often tried to engage in the general meetings but was promptly told to 'shut the F**K up'
- Milo (Paul Scheer) – spoiled and verbally-abusive son of Karen Sarducci
- Chad (Anna Faris) – an emotionally manipulative and oblivious boyfriend who engages in self-defensive arguments with female guests
- Kayla (Anna Faris) – an imposing and desperate aspiring actress who attempts to ingratiate herself with show guests (Note: "Kayla" appears in numerous episodes of the podcast, often in hypothetical sketch scenarios in which she confronts the celebrity guest(s) and asks them various questions and is oblivious to social hints. Some notable appearances include episodes: 41, 45, 61, and 62.)

== Episodes ==
No.	Release date	Guest(s) (Note: Featured guests adapted from the official Unqualified website archives.)	Notes
1	November 23, 2015	T.J. Miller	
2	November 30, 2015	Rosie O'Donnell	
3	December 15, 2015	Judah Friedlander	
—N/a	December 23, 2015	Aria Pullman, Josh Ostrander	Bonus episode
4	December 28, 2015	David Krumholtz	
5	January 11, 2016	Aubrey Plaza	
6	January 18, 2016	Michael Rapaport	
7	January 25, 2016	Ike Barinholtz	
8	February 1, 2016	Lance Bass	
9	February 8, 2016	Adam Carolla	
10	February 15, 2016	Jaime Pressly	
11	February 22, 2016	Lisa Kudrow	
12	February 29, 2016	Elliot Page	
13	March 8, 2016	Missi Pyle, Zach Selwyn	
14	March 15, 2016	Jenna Dewan-Tatum	
15	March 22, 2016	Melissa Benoist	
16	March 29, 2016	Alison Rosen; Jack and Karen Faris	
17	April 4–5, 2016	Chris Evans, Jenny Slate	Two-part episode
18	April 11–12, 2016	Olivia Munn	Two-part episode
19	April 18, 2016	Shaquille O'Neal	
20	April 25, 2016	Jason Mantzoukas	
21	May 2, 2016	Britt Robertson	
22	May 9, 2016	Tiffany Haddish	
23	May 16–17, 2016	Chelsea Handler	Two-part episode
24	May 23–24, 2016	Paul Scheer	Two-part episode
25	May 30, 2016	Anna Chlumsky	
26	June 6–7, 2016	Dave Bautista	Two-part episode
27	June 13–14, 2016	James Gunn	Two-part episode
28	June 20, 2016	Keegan-Michael Key	
29	June 28, 2016	Frank Grillo	
30	July 4–5, 2016	Aubrey Plaza, Retta	Two-part episode
31	July 11–12, 2016	Shane Dawson	Two-part episode
—N/a	July 14, 2016	—N/a	"Inside Unqualified"; bonus episode
32	July 18, 2016	Phoebe Robinson	
33	July 25–26, 2016	Julia Stiles	Two-part episode
34	August 2, 2016	Tatiana Maslany	Two-part episode
35	August 9, 2016	Patti Stanger	Two-part episode
36	August 16–17, 2016	Mike Birbiglia	Two-part episode
37	August 22, 2016	Courtney Love	
—N/a	August 25, 2016	Tavi Gevinson	Bonus episode
38	August 29–30, 2016	Eric Andre	Two-part episode
—N/a	August 31, 2016	Matthew Berry	Bonus episode
39	September 5–6, 2016	Johnny Galecki	Two-part episode
40	September 12, 2016	Regina King	
41	September 19–20, 2016	Regina Hall	Two-part episode
42	September 26–27, 2016	Ken Jeong	Two-part episode
43	October 4–5, 2016	Katie Couric	Two-part episode
44	October 11–12, 2016	Whitney Cummings	Live episode with audience
45	October 17–18, 2016	Dax Shepard	Two-part episode
46	October 24–25, 2016	Rachel Bloom	Two-part episode
—N/a	October 27, 2016	Susan McMartin	Bonus episode
47	October 31–November 1, 2016	Allison Janney	Two-part episode
48	November 7–8, 2016	Seth Rogen	Live episode with audience
49	November 14–15, 2016	Chris Hardwick	Two-part episode
50	November 21, 2016	Andy Cohen	Features caller updates
51	November 28–29, 2016	Isla Fisher	Two-part episode
—N/a	December 2, 2016	"Nina"	"Anna & Sam Hire an Intern"; bonus episode
52	December 5, 2016	Jason Mantzoukas, Paul Scheer, June Diane Raphael	"Anna's Birthday Episode"
53	December 13, 2016	Milo Ventimiglia	
54	December 19, 2016	Jeremy Renner	
55	December 26, 2016	Zachary Levi	
—N/a	January 2, 2017	—N/a	"Memorable Moments: Volume 1"
—N/a	January 9, 2017	—N/a	"Memorable Moments: Volume 2"
56	January 16, 2017	Kaitlin Olson, Scott MacArthur	
57	January 23, 2017	Russell Peters	
58	January 30, 2017	RuPaul	
59	February 6, 2017	Stan Lee	
60	February 13, 2017	Charlie Day	
61	February 20, 2017	Bob Odenkirk	
62	February 27, 2017	Lauren Graham	
63	March 6, 2017	Malin Akerman	
64	March 13, 2017	Joel McHale	
65	March 20, 2017	Michael Peña	
—N/a	March 22, 2017	—N/a	Sneak preview of Missi and Zach Might Bang podcast
66	March 27, 2017	Jillian Bell, Charlotte Newhouse	
67	April 3, 2017	Eric Stonestreet	
68	April 10, 2017	Sharon Stone	
69	April 17, 2017	Kristin Chenoweth	
70	April 24, 2017	Thomas Middleditch	
71	May 1, 2017	Lance Bass, Michael Turchin	
72	May 8, 2017	Terry Crews	
73	May 15, 2017	Timothy Simons	
74	May 22, 2017	Kelly Rohrbach	
75	May 29, 2017	Adam Pally, Zoe Lister-Jones	
76	June 5, 2017	Ari Graynor, Carrie Goldberg	
77	June 12, 2017	Nick Kroll	
78	June 19, 2017	Hannibal Buress, Lizzo	
79	June 26, 2017	Maria Bamford	
80	July 3, 2017	Justin Long, Chris Pratt, Zachary Levi, Adam Pally, Zoe Lister-Jones	"The Lost Tapes, Vol. 1"
81	July 10, 2017	Regina Hall, Tiffany Haddish	"The Lost Tapes, Vol. 2"
82	July 17, 2017	Andy Cohen	
83	July 24, 2017	Eva Longoria	
84	July 31, 2017	Josh Ostrander	
85	August 15, 2017	Karen Kilgariff, Georgia Hardstark	
86	August 22, 2017	Karen Kilgariff, Georgia Hardstark	
87	August 29, 2017	Alanis Morissette	
88	September 5, 2017	Emma Roberts	
89	September 12, 2017	Lake Bell	
90	September 19, 2017	Elizabeth Olsen	
91	September 26, 2017	Jack Johnson	
92	October 3, 2017	Lee Daniels	
93	October 10, 2017	Mel Rodriguez	
94	October 17, 2017	Jim Jefferies	
95	October 24, 2017	Arielle Kebbel	
96	October 31, 2017	Kelly Clarkson	
97	November 7, 2017	Marc Maron	
98	November 14, 2017	Adam Scott	
99	November 21–28, 2017	Lane Moore	Special two-part episode: Part one features interview with Sim and wife Amy; part two features Moore and takes place at the USC Gamma Phi Beta sorority
100	December 5, 2017	Rob Riggle	
101	December 12, 2017	Jesse Tyler Ferguson	
102	December 19, 2017	Denis Leary	
103	January 2, 2018	Nick Jonas	
104	January 9, 2018	Ed Helms	
105	January 16, 2018	Brittany Snow	
106	January 23, 2018	Colin Hanks	
107	January 30, 2018	Jimmy Kimmel, Molly McNearney	
108	February 6, 2018	Whitney Cummings	
109	February 13, 2018	Jena Friedman	
110	February 20, 2018	Tom Segura	
111	February 27, 2018	Allison Janney	
112	March 5, 2018	Olivia Cooke, Anya Taylor-Joy	
113	March 13, 2018	Heather Graham	
114	March 20, 2018	Macaulay Culkin	
115	March 27, 2018	Zach Braff	
116	April 3, 2018	Shay Mitchell	
117	April 10, 2018	Zoey Deutch	
118	April 17, 2018	Hayley Atwell	
119	April 24, 2018	Billy Eichner	
120	May 1, 2018	Eugenio Derbez	
121	May 8, 2018	Dax Shepard	
122	May 15, 2018	Bella Thorne	
123	May 22, 2018	Erika Jayne	
124	May 29, 2018	Becca Kufrin	
125	June 5, 2018	Natasha Leggero & Moshe Kasher	
126	June 12, 2018	Logan Browning	
127	June 19, 2018	Bert Kreischer	
128	June 26, 2018	Mayim Bialik	
129	July 3, 2018	Pete Holmes	
130	July 10, 2018	Topher Grace	
131	July 17, 2018	Shiri Appleby	
132	July 24, 2018	Kelly Ripa	Special appearance by Mark Consuelos and recorded on location at San Diego Comic-Con
133	July 31, 2018	Stephen Amell & Colton Haynes / Grant Gustin	Special appearance by Tom Cavanagh and recorded on location at San Diego Comic-Con
134	August 7, 2018	Kelly Ripa 2 & Camila Mendes	Final recording on location at San Diego Comic-Con
135	August 14, 2018	Bo Burnham	
136	August 21, 2018	David Spade	
137	August 28, 2018	Kat Dennings	
138	September 4, 2018	Jerrod Carmichael	
139	September 11, 2018	Judd Apatow	
140	September 18, 2018	Adam Rippon	
141	September 25, 2018	Constance Zimmer	
142	October 2, 2018	Kevin Smith	
143	October 9, 2018	Yvette Nicole Brown	
144	October 16, 2018	Skyler Samuels	
145	October 23, 2018	Mark Duplass	
146	October 30, 2018	Bobby Lee	
147	November 6, 2018	Maura Tierney	
148	November 13, 2018	Emily Ratajkowski	
149	November 20, 2018	Jay Pharoah	
150	November 27, 2018	Bill Hader	
151	December 4, 2018	Sophia Bush	
152	December 11, 2018	Jake Johnson	Recorded on location at The University of Southern California
153	December 18, 2018	Elizabeth Reaser	
154	January 3. 2019	Bill Hader, Sophia Bush, Macaulay Culkin, Billy Eichner, Adam Rippon, Adam Scott, Heather Graham	The Lost Tapes Vol. 3
155	January 8, 2019	Eric Christian Olsen & Sarah Wright	
156	January 15, 2019	Colton Underwood	
157	January 22, 2019	Mark-Paul Gosselaar	
158	January 29, 2019	Nina Dobrev	
159	February 5, 2019	Tony Hale	
160	February 12, 2019	Lena Headey	
161	February 19, 2019	Kobe Bryant	
162	February 26, 2019	Katharine Mcphee	
163	March 5, 2019	Ashley Benson	
164	September 30, 2019	Alison Brie	
165	October 7, 2019	Lilly Singh	
166	October 14, 2019	Justin Long	
167	October 21, 2019	Busy Philipps	
168	October 28, 2019	Elisha Cuthbert	
169	November 4, 2019	Tig Notaro	
170	November 11, 2019	Chris Sullivan	
171	November 18, 2019	Lizzy Caplan	
172	November 25, 2019	Bill Fichtner	
173	December 2, 2019	Kat Von D	
174	December 9, 2019	Sam Taylor Johnson and Aaron Taylor Johnson	
175	December 16, 2019	Whitney Cummings	
176	December 23, 2019	Christian Siriano	
177	January 6, 2020	Jeff Garlin	
178	January 13, 2020	Ed Droste	
179	January 20, 2020	Fortune Feimster	
180	January 27, 2020	Melissa Villaseñor	
181	February 3, 2020	Josh Gad	
182	February 10, 2020	Jason Biggs	
183	February 17, 2020	Judy Greer	
184	February 24, 2020	Andrea Savage	
185	March 2, 2020	Pamela Adlon	
186	March 9, 2020	Casey Wilson	
187	March 16, 2020	Nikki Glaser	
188	March 23, 2020	Wendi McLendon-Covey	
189	March 30, 2020	David Dobrik	
190	April 6, 2020	Alexandra Daddario	
191	April 13, 2020	Elizabeth Banks	
192	April 20, 2020	Josh Hutcherson	
193	April 27, 2020	Amanda Hess	
194	May 4, 2020	Nat Faxon and Jim Rash	
195	May 11, 2020	Lauren Lapkus	
196	May 18, 2020	Drew Scott and Linda Scott	
197	May 25, 2020	Clark Duke	
198	June 1, 2020	Bob Saget	
199	June 8, 2020	Sam Richardson	
200	June 15, 2020	Samin Nosrat	
201	June 22, 2020	Padma Lakshmi	
202	June 29, 2020	Chelsea Handler	
203	July 6, 2020	Samantha Irby	
204	July 15, 2020	Esther Povitsky	
205	July 20, 2020	Paul Scheer	
206	July 27, 2020	Thomas Middleditch	
207	August 3, 2020	Sean Hayes	
208	August 10, 2020	Seth Rogen	
209	August 17, 2020	Demi Moore and Shana Feste	
210	August 24, 2020	Kenan Thompson	
211	August 31, 2020	Ellie Kemper	
212	September 7, 2020	Olivia Munn	
213	September 14, 2020	Paris Hilton	
214	September 21, 2020	Tika Sumpter	
215	September 28, 2020	Adam DeVine	
216	October 5, 2020	Eva Longoria	
217	October 12, 2020	Norah Jones	
218	October 19, 2020	David Chang	
219	October 26, 2020	Jim Jefferies	
220	November 2, 2020	April Beyer	
221	November 9, 2020	Malcolm Gladwell	
222	November 16, 2020	Beth Behrs	
223	November 23, 2020	Kate Mara	
224	November 30, 2020	Joel McHale	
225	December 7, 2020	Seth Green	
226	December 14, 2020	Kaley Cuoco	
227	December 21, 2020	Clea DuVall	
228	January 4, 2021	Emerald Fennell and Carey Mulligan	
229	January 11, 2021	Meagan Good	
230	January 18, 2021	Amy Schumer	
231	January 25, 2021	Elizabeth Berkley Lauren	
232	February 1, 2021	Melissa McCarthy	
233	February 8, 2021	Carrie Brownstein	
234	February 15, 2021	Kyra Sedgwick	
235	February 22, 2021	Katherine Heigl and Sarah Chalke	
236	March 1, 2021	Chloë Grace Moretz	
237	March 8, 2021	Ciara Bravo	
238	March 15, 2021	Brie Larson and Jessie Ennis	
239	March 22, 2021	Gwyneth Paltrow	
240	March 29, 2021	Adam Brody	
241	April 5, 2021	Ben Falcone	
242	April 12, 2021	Bob Odenkirk	
243	April 19, 2021	Vanessa Bayer	
244	April 26, 2021	Lamorne Morris	
245	May 3, 2021	Rachel Bilson	
246	May 10, 2021	Carla Hall	
247	May 17, 2021	Zoey Deutch	
248	May 24, 2021	Tia Mowry	
249	May 31, 2021	Glennon Doyle	

- First Episode was originally with Allison Janney, but was later removed supposedly due to explicit content.

== Accolades ==
- Winner: Shorty Awards (2017) for Best Podcast
- Nominated: iHeartRadio Podcast Awards (2019) for Best Comedy Podcast
