= Stay Sexy and Don't Get Murdered =

2019 non-fiction book by Georgia Hardstark and Karen Kilgariff

Stay Sexy & Don’t Get Murdered: The Definitive How-to Guide
- First edition (US)
- Author: Karen Kilgariff; Georgia Hardstark
- Audio read by: Karen Kilgariff, Georgia Hardstark, Paul Giamatti
- Language: English
- Genre: Memoir, Humor
- Publisher: Forge Books
- Publication date: May 28, 2019
- Publication place: United States
- Pages: 304
- ISBN: 978-1-250-17895-4

Stay Sexy & Don’t Get Murdered: The Definitive How-to Guide is a nonfiction book written by Georgia Hardstark and Karen Kilgariff, host of the true crime comedy podcast My Favorite Murder. The book is a dual memoir of Hardstark and Kilgariff and also discusses true crime. It was released on May 28, 2019. There is an audiobook available with Georgia Hardstark and Karen Kilgariff as the narrators, also with the help of Paul Giamatti.

== Synopsis ==
The book is a dual memoir of Kilgariff and Hardstark. Along with the title of the book, chapter titles in the book are also common catch phrases taken from the podcast, My Favorite Murder. The book also includes personal photos from Kilgariff and Hardstark's life such as family photos or photos from their youth. Critics have noted that though the book does touch on true crime, it is largely a mixture of memoir and self-help.

== Structure ==
Each chapter of Stay Sexy & Don't Get Murdered, is split between Hardstark and Kilgariff telling their own experiences.

- Intro: Let's Sit Crooked & Talk Straight
1. F*ck Politeness
2. Sweet Baby Angel
3. You're in a Cult, Call Your Dad
4. Send 'Em Back
5. Don't be a Fucking Lunatic
6. Get a Job
7. Buy Your Own Shit
8. Stay Out of the Forest
- Conclusion: Fuckin' Hooray!

== True crime mentions ==
- Polly Klaas
- Paul Bernardo and Karla Homolka
- Roy Melanson
- Rodney Alcala
- Ted Bundy
- Jonestown
