= I-70 Strangler =

Unidentified American serial killer

- Wanted since: June 16, 1980; 46 years ago

Details
- Victims: 12+
- Span of crimes: June 1980 – October 1991
- Country: United States
- States: Indiana, Ohio
- Date apprehended: N/A

The I-70 Strangler is the nickname of an unidentified American serial killer who murdered at least twelve boys and men in the Midwest between 1980 and 1991. All of the victims' bodies were discovered in areas along Interstate 70 (I-70). Though officially unsolved, it is believed that deceased businessman Herb Baumeister, a suspect in over a dozen homicides in Indiana, might have been the perpetrator.

== Murders ==
The killer would choose young boys and adolescents as victims, whom he met in popular gay bars and other similar establishments within a four-block radius in Indianapolis. All of the victims were later found naked or partially clothed near I-70, often dumped in rivers, streams and ditches in the rural countryside. Each had been strangled to death.

In total, 12 men and boys were recorded as his official victims:

- Michael Petree (15) was discovered naked in rural Hamilton County, Indiana on June 16, 1980. Despite his young age, he was a male sex worker who spent most of his time around Indianapolis' gay bars. He was reported missing on June 7, but three days later, he was observed in different parts of the city riding along in a stranger's car. The cause of death was established as strangulation; no traces of drugs or alcohol were found in his blood.
- Maurice Taylor's (23) shirtless body was found in July 1982 in the Weasel Creek in rural Hamilton County outside Atlanta. While his cause of death couldn't be definitively established, the coroners suspected that he had been strangled. Taylor was a vagrant who lived in the boiler room of an apartment complex in Indianapolis, and due to his financial difficulties, he offered sexual services around the gay bars. He remained unidentified for eight months, since his mother, who was detained in a mental hospital, was unable to file a missing persons report.
- Delvoyd Lee Baker (14), an 8th grader, was found semi-nude near a river in Hamilton County. While investigating his death, police located witnesses who stated that Baker was last seen on the evening of October 2 in downtown Indianapolis, boarding a blue van driven by a young white man with a bushy moustache. The boy's parents told police that he had been riding his bike to the city center on the evening of his disappearance, from where he called home at 10:30 PM to inform them that he was going to be late because he wanted to go to the cinema. This statement concerned Baker's parents, who knew that he had no pocket money on him. It was later established that Baker and a 16-year-old friend had been cruising the Indianapolis gay bars for the last three months, and according to his friend, he and Baker engaged in sex work for $20–23 per night. Due to several differences in comparison with other victims (being the youngest and only black victim), Baker's homicide was considered to be unrelated by some policemen.
- Michael Andrew Riley (22) disappeared on May 28, 1983, after visiting 'The Vogue Theater' (other sources claim it was 'The Broad Ripple'), a nightclub in Indianapolis. He was last seen with an unfamiliar man, with whom he later left. Riley's nude body was later found in a ditch in Hancock County, southeast of Greenfield, on June 5. The autopsy determined that he had been strangled, with the perpetrator likely using a towel or similar fabric.
- Eric Allen Roettger (17) vanished on May 7, 1985, with his shirtless body found a few days later near a stream in rural Preble County, Ohio, east of Lewisburg. According to his parents, Roettger was planning to attend interviews for a summer job on the day of his disappearance, but didn't attend any of them. His friends and relatives denied that he was gay, and later research indicated that Roettger had many friends and acquaintances who were drug addicts or drug traffickers. Witnesses claimed that they had seen Eric at a bus stop in the early morning of May 7, but instead of waiting for the bus, he accepted a ride from a passing car. When found, he had an apparent burn mark on his left shoulder, and had been strangled with a rope.
- Michael Allen Glenn's (29) body, clad only in his underwear, was found in a ditch near Eaton, Ohio in August 1986. He lived separately from his parents in a trailer park located on the outskirts of Indianapolis and worked as a handyman, so the exact date of his disappearance couldn't be established. Strangulation marks, possibly from a rope, were found on his neck. He was identified three years after his discovery with the help of fingerprinting.
- James Robbins (21) went missing on October 15, 1987, at around 10 PM, shortly after leaving his mother's home in Indianapolis and walking to the southern part of the city. Two days later, his naked body bearing strangulation marks was found in a ditch in rural Shelby County, near I-70 south of Gwynneville. While investigating his murder, police located two witnesses who gave conflicting information: one claimed that they had seen a red Jeep Wrangler Renegade near the crime scene, while another said that the car was a Chevrolet Blazer.
- Jean Paul Talbot (26), like the previous victims, was found strangled to death in May 1989. His body had been dumped near a stream in Defiance County, Ohio.
- Steven L. Elliot (26)'s body, clad in his underwear, was found in August 1989 in rural Preble County, Ohio, again near I-70. He had been strangled, presumably with a rope. Elliot's father told police that when his son came out as gay in 1979, he then left the family household and became involved in sex work, developing an alcohol addiction.
- Clay Russell Boatman (32), a licensed practical nurse, disappeared in August 1990, after leaving his Richmond apartment to visit Our Place, a local gay bar. His body, showing signs of strangulation, was found in a ditch by a group of children near Eaton, Ohio. When interviewed about his life, Boatman's family denied that he was homosexual.
- Thomas Clevenger Jr. (19) vanished without a trace at the end of August 1990, and his semi-nude body was later found at an abandoned railroad track near Greenville, Ohio. Clevenger grew up in a poor neighborhood of Indianapolis, and due to his rocky upbringing, he started committing crimes and drinking at an early age. At the age of 14, he attacked and then stabbed his deputy headmaster, and during his school years, he was diagnosed with an intellectual disability, because of which he had problems reading and writing. Shortly before his death, he engaged in sex work near gay bars to earn money, a fact denied by his mother and sister.
- Otto Gary Becker's (42) body was found in a ditch next to a gravel road in rural Henry County, Indiana on October 7, 1991. While investigating his murder, police found several witnesses who claimed to have seen Becker in a car with two other men earlier that day, driving north on I-70 near Indianapolis. According to them, one of the men was holding Becker down while the other was driving. The witnesses were taken to the police station and shown photographs of various criminals convicted of kidnapping and murder charges in the state, but none of them was matched to the alleged abductors.

== Investigation ==
A task force of 8 officers was created by Indianapolis Police in 1982 to investigate the crimes. Following the discovery of Riley's body in June 1983, four more men were included in the list of potential victims: 25-year-old Gary Davis, 27-year-old Dennis Brotzge, 21-year-old John Roach and 22-year-old Daniel McNeive. Like the other victims, they were all homosexual, visited gay bars and were killed in Indianapolis between August 1981 and May 1983. In 1983, the FBI joined the investigation, with profilers suggesting that the offender showed volatile behavior when committing the murders. Near the end, it was determined that there were at least two different perpetrators operating independently of one another; because of this, Davis, Brotzge, Roach and McNeive were removed from the list.

According to the FBI, Davis, Brotzge, Roach and McNeive's killer was a white man between the ages of 20 and 30, worked in job requiring low skilled-labor, was a fan of military paraphernalia and led a healthy lifestyle. In his everyday life, he expressed homophobic views, but was secretly a latent homosexual who committed the murders out of shame and self-hatred. The other victims, according to investigators, were killed by a white man, about 45 years of age, likely overweight, had a high-paying job and was well-respected in his community. They also concluded that the killer may be married, but has no intimate relationship with his wife. Likely because of his attraction to adolescent boys and young men, he feels shame and guilt that, in addition to possibly destroying his career and reputation, would result in a deep hatred and subsequent murder.

=== Initial suspects ===
One of the first suspects was 47-year-old Duncan Patterson, a Florida native. In the fall of 1982, he was arrested in Indianapolis on charges of statutory rape against young boys, and shortly after his arrest, a friend of Delvoyd Baker claimed that the former had gotten into Patterson's van. Patterson later admitted that it was true, and that he had paid Baker $20 for oral sex, which the two had in a hotel room. He denied killing the boy, however, claiming that he had taken Baker after sex to the Indianapolis Central Library, where he let him go and saw him enter another van. Patterson's testimony was corroborated by a witness who had seen Baker leave the van, go up the library steps to talk a man he apparently knew, before the two got into the older man's car. To assess his credibility, Patterson was asked to undergo a polygraph test, to which he agreed and then successfully passed. While he was convicted on charges of child molestation, he was officially excluded as a suspect.

In 1983, a resident of Carmel, August 'Gus' Caito, was briefly detained and interrogated for the murders in Indianapolis, but was quickly released after investigators found no evidence linking him to any of the crimes.

Another, more viable suspect was convicted serial killer Larry Eyler, who was found guilty of murdering 21 adolescent boys and young men in Indiana and Illinois, and was on death row at the time for the 1986 murder of 16-year-old Daniel Bridges. However, there were inconsistencies in the modus operandi of Eyler and that of the I-70 Strangler: Eyler's killings occurred over a year and he killed his victims with a knife, while the I-70 Strangler's victims were strangled over a period of 11 years. Nevertheless, both killers targeted homosexuals and dumped their bodies near interstate highways. As several victims were found near Richmond, Indiana, where Eyler's mother lived, it was suggested that the killings were linked to those of Eyler. While awaiting execution at the Pontiac Correctional Center, in November 1990, Eyler, with assistance of his lawyer, Kathleen Zellner, invited the Illinois and Indiana authorities to negotiate a plea deal: in exchange for commuting his sentence, he would provide information that would help solve more than 20 murders, which he alleged to have committed with the help of his lover, Robert Little, a professor at Indiana University. Prosecutors in seven of the nine counties agreed to the bargain, with the sole exception of Cook County, Illinois, where Eyler had been convicted of killing Bridges in 1986. Shortly thereafter, the Vermillion County Attorney's Office reopened its investigation into the murder of 23-year-old Steven Agan, who had been stabbed to death on December 19, 1982. Fearing new charges, on December 4, 1990, Eyler wrote a 17-page confession concerning the murder of Agan, which he claimed was committed with the help of Little. The prosecutors offered a plea deal, according to which Eyler would plead guilty and receive a 60-year sentence. Eyler agreed, and at his April 1991 trial, he became a key witness and testified against Little. However, no physical evidence was uncovered that implicated Little, who claimed that in December 1982, he had gone to visit his mother in Florida. After seven hours of deliberation, he was found not guilty by jury verdict, and Eyler's testimony was ruled inconclusive. Two days after his death on March 8, 1994, Eyler's lawyer announced at a press conference that his posthumous confession would be made public. In it, Eyler admitted that he had killed 21 young men between 1982 and 1984, four of which were committed with Little's knowledge or assistance. The list included John Roach and Daniel McNeive, but none of the I-70 Strangler's victims. Aside from these murders, Eyler remains a suspect in three other murders committed in Indiana, Kentucky and Wisconsin.

=== Herb Baumeister ===
In February 1998, an Indianapolis resident contacted the police and claimed that a local businessman, Herb Baumeister, was the mysterious man photographed leaving The Vogue Theater with one of the I-70 Strangler's victims, Michael Riley. Prior to his suicide in 1996, Baumeister was the prime suspect in the murders of at least seven men who were killed between 1993 and 1995 in Indianapolis, whose remains were later found buried on his property. After this information surfaced, Baumeister was named as the prime suspect in the I-70 Strangler case. According to investigators, he stopped dumping the bodies of his victims in 1991 after he bought the Fox Hollow Farm, which he would use as a burial site for his subsequent victims.

No physical evidence has linked Baumeister and the I-70 Strangler victims. Ted Fleischaker has claimed that Baumeister wasn't responsible for the killings and accused the police officials of police misconduct, saying that they used him as a convenient excuse to close the cases ahead of a municipal election, while the real killer(s) remain at large.

== See also ==
- I-70 killer
- List of fugitives from justice who disappeared
- List of serial killers in the United States
