= Three Dreams Denied =

- The Simpsons episode
- Promotional Poster
- Episode no.: Season 32; Episode 7
- Directed by: Steven Dean Moore
- Written by: Danielle Weisberg
- Production code: QABF02
- Original air date: November 22, 2020

Guest appearances
- Ben Platt as Blake; Paul Rudd as himself

Episode features
- Couch gag: The family arrives to find the couch has prepared Thanksgiving dinner, but it says that they said they'd be home at 7 and to go sleep on the bed, then it blows the candles, darkening the room.

Episode chronology
← Previous "Podcast News"	Next → "The Road to Cincinnati"
- The Simpsons season 32

"Three Dreams Denied" is the seventh episode of the thirty-second season of the American animated television series The Simpsons, and the 691st episode overall. It aired in the United States on Fox on November 22, 2020. The episode was directed by Steven Dean Moore and written by Danielle Weisberg.

Ben Platt guest-stars in the episode as Blake, while Paul Rudd appears as himself. In the episode, Comic Book Guy goes to Comicalooza, finding himself dumbstruck as he loses his chance at Marvel, Bart becomes a voice-over actor, and Lisa gets a new rival at school. It also received generally positive reviews, and was watched live in the United States by 4.41 million viewers.

== Plot ==
After Agnes Skinner sells her son's Radioactive Man doll to him for cheap, Comic Book Guy sells it online, which allows him to go on his dream trip to Comicalooza. On the plane, Comic Book Guy tries to come up with the perfect question to ask at a panel, in hopes of being given a job at Marvel Studios. Outside of Comicalooza he manages to come up with a question, but when his turn comes, he forgets it. He returns to Springfield despondent but cheers himself up again by abusing Ralph Wiggum.

Meanwhile, Lisa meets a new boy in school named Blake, who she is happy to learn also plays the saxophone. However, Blake tricks Lisa into losing her first-chair position in the school band. She is devastated at first, but soon realizes that she can play music outside of school and starts to perform at the Springfield Mall, earning praise from the shoppers.

Bart meets a voice-over actor who gets him a job at an animated TV show. Bart invites Nelson Muntz and his friends over to watch his show. Upon watching it, Bart finds out he voices a princess, which causes the others to make fun of him. Later, Bart's character ends up actually being a ruthless killer, which impresses everyone.

In a mid-credits scene, Comic Book Guy can be seen sitting on a bench outside Comicalooza, writing questions. He asks why the first thing people think when they see Superman is a bird, and proposes a Superhero called "SuperSpiderBat," a combination of Superman, Spider-Man, and Batman. In the background, many pop culture characters (or people cosplaying as them) can be seen, including Robin, a Minecraft guy, Matt Groening, Morbo from Futurama, Deadpool, Poison Ivy, and Ahsoka Tano perched atop Anakin Skywalker.

== Production ==
This is the first episode of the series written by Danielle Weisberg, who was an assistant on the show at the time the episode was written. The episode was originally titled "The Voice Actor's Apprentice."

Ben Platt appeared in the episode as Blake and Paul Rudd appeared as himself. Rudd previously guest-starred in two other episodes. Dawnn Lewis also appears as an airplane stewardess. In 2020, Fox released eight promotional pictures from the episode.

== Reception ==
=== Viewing figures ===
In the United States, the episode was watched live by 4.41 million viewers.

=== Critical response ===
Tony Sokol with Den of Geek said, "The Simpsons are always self-referential, but it gets very subliminal in 'Three Dreams Denied.' ... This week, Bart is playing a voiceover actor. I’m sure Professor Frink could come up with some reason this somehow flays the laws of animation physics. This is probably why the episode falls short. No one episode of The Simpsons can handle the voiceover click-track continuum, smooth jazz and the ultimate question to ask at Comicalooza. It’s just too much. In the past, The Simpsons could have borne the extra weight. They’ve always had cross plots, subplots and occasional mini-arcs which play out under the radar. Each of the three stories are strong, funny and have the pathos or peril needed to make them great. In that sense, 'Three Dreams Denied' is very much operating in The Simpsons early mode. While the journey flies by without too many bumps, the episode lives up to its title." He also gave the episode three out of five stars.

Jesse Bereta of Bubbleblabber gave the episode a 7.5 out of 10. He highlighted the stories of Comic Book Guy and Lisa but thought Bart's story could have been done better. However, he enjoyed the amount of jokes and references in the episode.

=== Awards and nominations ===
Writer Danielle Weisberg was nominated for a Writers Guild of America Award for Television: Animation for this episode at the 73rd Writers Guild of America Awards.
