= The 7 Beer Itch =

- The Simpsons episode
- Title card; spelled as "The Seven Beer Itch"
- Episode no.: Season 32; Episode 5
- Directed by: Mike Frank Polcino
- Story by: Al Jean
- Teleplay by: Joel H. Cohen; John Frink
- Production code: ZABF15
- Original air date: November 8, 2020

Guest appearances
- Olivia Colman as Lily; Robin Atkin Downes and Brian George as Pubgoers and Londoners

Episode features
- Couch gag: The family as astronauts jump to and sit on the couch on the moon. However, after Homer tries to sit, he is ejected into space.

Episode chronology
← Previous "Treehouse of Horror XXXI"	Next → "Podcast News"
- The Simpsons season 32

"The 7 Beer Itch" is the fifth episode of the thirty-second season of the American animated television series The Simpsons, and the 689th episode overall. It aired in the United States on Fox on November 8, 2020. The episode was directed by Mike Frank Polcino, and the teleplay was written by Joel H. Cohen and John Frink from a story by Al Jean.

Olivia Colman guest-stars in the episode as Lily, who moves to Springfield and falls in love with Homer. The episode received generally positive reviews and was watched live in the United States by 1.74 million viewers.

== Plot ==
Lily, a beautiful Englishwoman banished for being too exciting for her countrymen, decides to begin a new life in Springfield. At Moe's Tavern, she enthralls the barflies, but decides that the only man she wants is Homer, who is feeling down because Marge took the kids on a vacation without him. However, Homer, missing his family, is largely indifferent to Lily, which only makes her want him more.

Meanwhile, Bart gets Lyme disease after absent-mindedly running into a forest filled with ticks and Marge, already growing tired of the vacation, takes Maggie to the dock where a crazy mob of tourists almost runs them over.

Elsewhere, Mr. Burns is spying on Lily and decides that he must have her. He commands Homer to lure Lily into meeting him on his boat, to which Homer agrees. However, when Lily runs away from the date, Homer begins to feel bad and consoles her. When Homer drives her home, they kiss, much to Homer's dismay.

Later, Marge comes home early due to the failure of her vacation and Homer gets a call from an unknown number, which turns out to be Lily. Homer decides that he only wants to be with Marge. Lily decides that there is nothing left for her in Springfield and she returns to England.

Back in England, Lily turns down the advances of the pubgoers until she meets a British Homer lookalike.

== Production ==
=== Casting ===
Olivia Colman appeared in the episode as Lily. Colman recorded her lines remotely from London over three sessions. Also, Alex Désert, who voices Carl Carlson, dubbed over all of Hank Azaria's lines as the character, as the episode was produced before Désert replaced Azaria as the voice of Carl. The various Englishmen in London and the pubs at the start and end of the episode were voiced by veteran English actors Robin Atkin Downes and Brian George. Downes tweeted following the episode's original airing with pictures of the characters he voiced stating he was "so thrilled to be a part of this iconic show" and that he still could not believe it.

=== Release ===
In 2020, Fox released eight promotional pictures from the episode. The episode was originally scheduled to air on November 1, 2020, however, due to being preempted by "Treehouse of Horror XXXI", which was preempted by game seven of the 2020 National League Championship Series, the episode was rescheduled to air on November 8, 2020.

== Reception ==
=== Viewing figures ===
In the United States, the episode was watched live by 1.74 million viewers.

=== Critical response ===
Tony Sokol with Den of Geek said, "In the past, Homer was more self-conscious of the temptations. He really isn't a witting partner tonight. He almost exhibits a thoughtful obstinacy, it takes so long to register. This robs the episode of friction, and tips the balance. It turns Lily into more of a predator than she needs to be, but it also makes it all the more predictable. ‘The 7 Beer Itch’ is loaded with funny lines and sight gags, but it doesn't cover up how many times they've given us this premise. They can dress it up with a British accent, but it offers a performus interruptus payoff." He also gave the episode three out of five stars.

Jesse Bereta of Bubbleblabber gave the episode a 7 out of 10. He thought the use of Groundskeeper Willy as the narrator was only used to fill time. He stated that the subplot with Marge and the children on vacation could have been expanded. However, he stated that the story of Homer fighting for his marriage was a novel approach to a story that had been previously done.
