= Anna Faris =

American actress (born 1976)

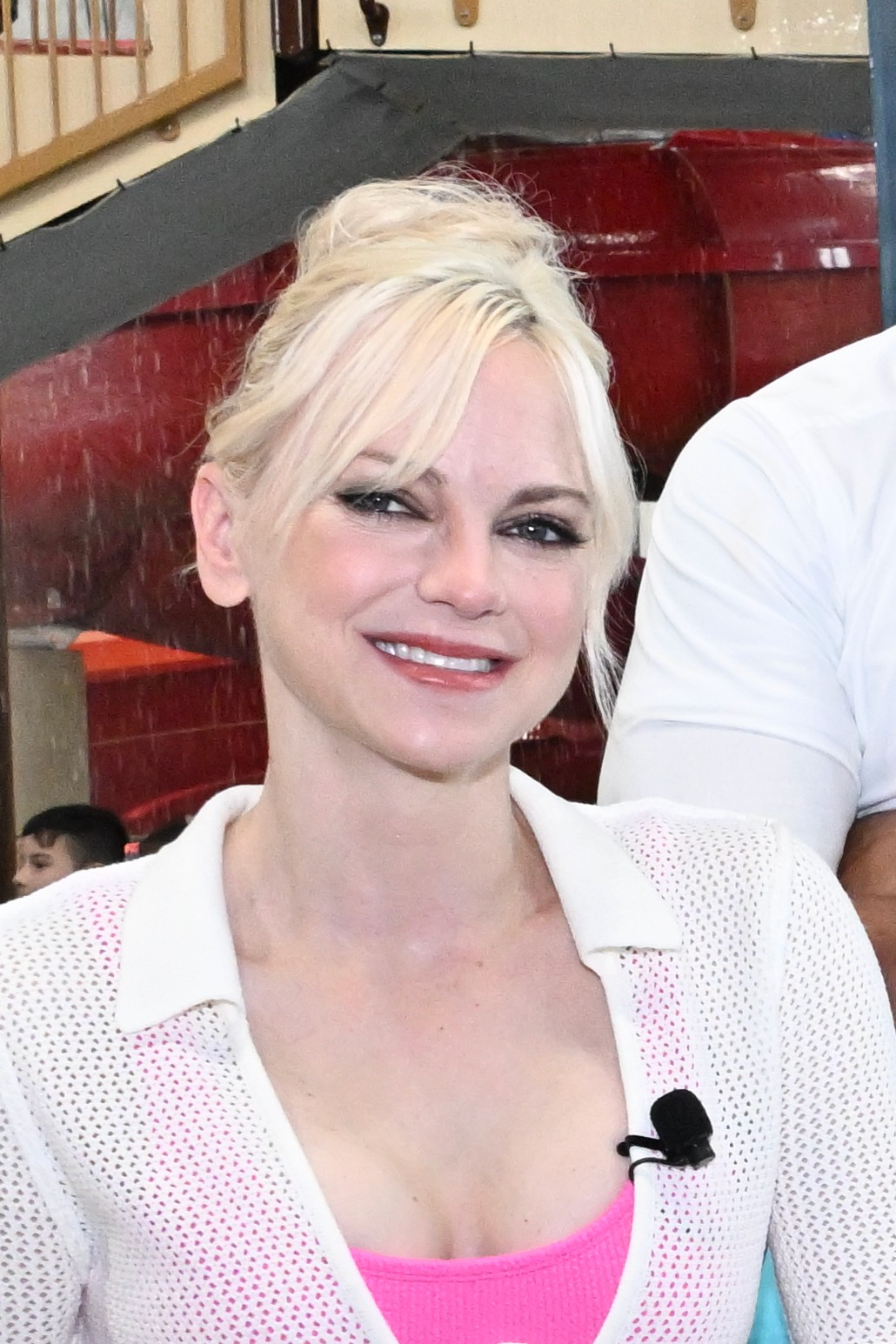
- Faris in 2023
- Born: Anna Kay Faris; November 29, 1976 (age 49); Baltimore, Maryland, U.S.
- Other names: Anna Faris-Indra; Anna Faris-Pratt
- Education: University of Washington (BA)
- Occupations: Actress; comedian; producer; writer; podcaster; author
- Years active: 1986–present
- Spouses: Ben Indra (m. 2004; div. 2008); Chris Pratt (m. 2009; div. 2018); Michael Barrett (m. 2021)
- Children: 1

Anna Kay Faris (/ˈɑːnə ˈfærɪs/ AH-nə FARR-is; born November 29, 1976) is an American actress, comedian, producer, writer, podcaster, and author. She rose to prominence for her comedic roles, particularly the lead part of Cindy Campbell in the Scary Movie films (2000–present). Her films as a leading actress have grossed over $1.5 billion worldwide.

Faris' film credits include May, The Hot Chick (both 2002), Lost in Translation (2003), Brokeback Mountain, Just Friends (both 2005), My Super Ex-Girlfriend (2006), Smiley Face (2007), The House Bunny (2008), What's Your Number? (2011), The Dictator (2012), and Overboard (2018). She also had voice-over roles in the film franchises Cloudy with a Chance of Meatballs (2009–2013) and Alvin and the Chipmunks (2009–2015).

On television, Faris played the recurring role of Erica in the tenth and final season of the NBC sitcom Friends (2004) and the co-lead of Christy Plunkett in the CBS sitcom Mom (2013–2021). Outside of acting, she created and hosted the advice podcast Unqualified (2015–2023). She wrote a 2017 memoir of the same name, which became a New York Times Best Seller.

== Early life and education ==
Faris was born in Baltimore, Maryland, on November 29, 1976, the second child of Jack, a sociology professor, and Karen Faris, a special education teacher. Both her parents, natives of Seattle, Washington, were living in Baltimore as her father had accepted a professorship at Towson University. When Faris was six, the family moved to Edmonds, Washington. Her father worked at the University of Washington as a vice president of internal communications, and later headed the Washington Biotechnology and Biomedical Association, while her mother taught at Seaview Elementary School in Edmonds.

Faris has an older brother, Robert, who is a sociologist (as was her great-grandfather Ellsworth), currently a professor at the University of California, Davis. In interviews, she has described her parents as "ultra liberal" and said that she and her brother were raised in an irreligious but "very conservative", traditional atmosphere. At age six, her parents enrolled her in a community drama class for children, as they usually encouraged her to act. She enjoyed watching plays and eventually produced her own material in her bedroom with neighborhood friends. She has said in interviews she often imagined her orthodontal retainer talking to her, and that she pictured herself "on talk shows to talk about [her] talking retainer".

Faris attended Edmonds Woodway High School. While studying, performed onstage with a Seattle repertory company and in nationally broadcast radio plays. She once described herself as "a drama-club dork," and said she used to wear a Christmas-tree skirt in school. She graduated in 1994. She attended the University of Washington, where she earned a degree in English literature in 1999. Despite her love of acting, she admitted she "never really thought [she] wanted to become a movie star" and continued to act "just to make some extra money," hoping one day to publish a novel. After graduating from college, she was going to travel to London, where she had a receptionist job lined up at an ad agency. However, she ended up living in Los Angeles "at the last minute," once she committed to the idea of pursuing acting. Shortly afterwards, she obtained the starring role in Scary Movie. At age 22, she lived in a studio apartment at The Ravenswood in Hancock Park.

== Career ==
=== 1986–1999: Early acting credits ===
Encouraged by her parents to pursue acting when she was young, Faris gave her first professional performance at age nine in a three-month run of Arthur Miller's play Danger: Memory! at the Seattle Repertory Theater. She made US$250 for the role, which was "huge" for her at the time. "I felt like I was rolling in the dough," she recalled. She went on to play Scout in a production of To Kill a Mockingbird at the Village Theatre in Issaquah, Washington, the title character in Heidi, and Rebecca in Our Town. Her theater credits during that period included productions of Rain, Some Fish, No Elephants, and Life Under Water.

While in high school, Faris appeared in a television commercial for a frozen yogurt brand and in a training video for Red Robin. On the latter, she said in May 2012: "I play, like, the perfect hostess. And I think they still use it." While in college at the University of Washington in 1996, Faris appeared in the MSN Preview, an interactive CD-ROM promotional video for Microsoft's MSN 2.0 online service filmed at the Paramount Theatre in Seattle, as the presenter of Channel 5, a "hip and edgy" website for young adults.

Faris played brief roles in the made-for-TV film Deception: A Mother's Secret and the independent drama Eden, the latter of which screened at the 1996 Sundance Film Festival. Her first major film role came shortly after college, in the independent slasher film Lovers Lane (1999), in which she played an ill-fated cheerleader. A B-movie, it received a straight-to-DVD release. Critical reception was mixed, but for her part, Faris garnered her first acting reviews by writers; efilmcritic.com's Greg Muskewitz found her the film's "one center of interest".

=== 2000–2006: Breakthrough with Scary Movie ===
Faris's breakout role came in 2000 when she starred in the horror-comedy parody film Scary Movie, portraying Cindy Campbell, a play on the character of Sidney Prescott (Neve Campbell) in the slasher thriller Scream. It marked her first starring credit, as she had appeared only in small and supporting parts in theater plays and low-budget features. She found the experience a "great boot camp" for her, as she told UK's The Guardian in 2009, explaining that she "hadn't done much before that. With those movies, you have to be so exact with your props and the physical comedy and everything, so it was a great training ground." Scary Movie was a major commercial success, ranking atop the box office charts with a US$42 million opening weekend gross. It went on to earn US$278 million worldwide. For her performance, Faris received nominations for the Breakthrough Female Performance and Best Kiss Awards at the 2001 MTV Movie Awards. She subsequently reprised her role in Scary Movie 2, released on July 4, 2001.

Her next film role was that of the lesbian colleague of a lonely and traumatized young woman in the independent psychological thriller May (2002), which premiered at the Sundance Film Festival and was released in selected theaters. In its review, The Digital Fix found it "one of the finest examples of independent American genre filmmaking" and asserted that Faris played her role "with an infectious level of enthusiasm, frequently skirting the border between a believable performance and one that is completely over the top, but always managing to come down on the right side." Later in 2002, she starred alongside Rob Schneider and Rachel McAdams in the comedy The Hot Chick, about a teenage girl whose mind is magically swapped with that of a 30-year-old criminal. It was a modest commercial success, grossing US$54 million worldwide.

In 2003, Faris was "cast last-minute" opposite Bill Murray and Scarlett Johansson in Sofia Coppola's drama Lost in Translation, where she played a "bubbly, extroverted" actress. She felt the film gave her the chance to get people to know her body of work a "little more," and called it "the best experience of [her] life" at the time. While Variety remarked that Faris "contributes an amusing turn" as her "vacuous movie star" character, New York Times concluded that the actress, "who barely registers in the Scary Movie pictures—and she's the star—comes to full, lovable and irritating life as a live-wire starlet [...] this movie will secure her a career." Budgeted at US$4 million, Lost in Translation grossed US$119.7 million globally. She portrayed Cindy Campbell for the third time in 2003's Scary Movie 3.

In 2004, Faris debuted on the last season of the sitcom Friends in the recurring role of Erica, the mother whose twin babies are adopted by Chandler (Matthew Perry) and Monica (Courteney Cox); and in the summer that year, she filmed a small part in Ang Lee's drama Brokeback Mountain (2005). As her character had just "one scene in the movie," she only spent two days on set in Calgary. For the film, Faris, along with her co-stars, received a Screen Actors Guild Award nomination for Outstanding Performance by a Cast in a Motion Picture.

Faris starred in the 2005 comedies Waiting... and Just Friends, both alongside Ryan Reynolds. Waiting... was an independent production about restaurant employees who collectively stave off boredom and adulthood with their antics. Budgeted at US$3 million, it made US$18.6 million, but a View London reviewer, remarking that the director had "assembled a decent comic cast," felt that "he gives them practically nothing to do. Reynolds and [...] Faris were hilarious together in Just Friends, so it's a shame that their talents are so wasted here." In Just Friends, Faris portrayed Samantha James, an emerging, self-obsessed pop singer landing in New Jersey with a formerly overweight nerd (played by co-star Reynolds), now a successful record producer. It grossed US$50.9 million around the globe, and earned Faris nominations for an MTV Movie Award and two Teen Choice Awards.

Faris played Cindy Campbell for the fourth time in Scary Movie 4, which premiered on April 14, 2006. In 2006, she also appeared opposite Uma Thurman and Luke Wilson in Ivan Reitman's romantic comedy My Super Ex-Girlfriend, playing Hannah, the co-worker of a man (Wilson) dating a neurotic and aggressive superhero (Thurman). While critical response was mixed, it made US$61 million worldwide, and Faris and Thurman both got MTV Movie Award nominations for Best Fight.

=== 2007–2012: Continued comedic roles ===
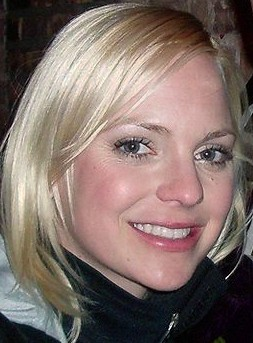
Faris in January 2007

In Gregg Araki's independent stoner comedy Smiley Face (2007), Faris starred as Jane F, a young woman who has a series of misadventures after eating a large number of cupcakes laced with cannabis. It premiered at the Sundance Film Festival and received a limited theatrical release in Los Angeles. Reviews were largely positive; according to the film-critics aggregate site Rotten Tomatoes, writers agreed that her "bright performance and Gregg Araki's sharp direction" made the film "more than [the] average stoner comedy." It earned her the "Stonette of the Year" prize at High Times magazine's Stony Awards. Most critics agree that it remains one of her best films.

Faris appeared opposite Diane Keaton and Jon Heder in the independent comedy Mama's Boy, playing an aspiring singer and the love interest of a self-absorbed 29-year-old (Heder). Distributed for a limited release to certain parts of the United States only, Mama's Boy premiered on November 30, 2007, to lukewarm critical and commercial responses. She followed up by producing and starring in a mainstream feature comedy, The House Bunny, devised and written by Karen McCullah and Kirsten Smith, with Fred Wolf coming on board to direct. In the film, she appeared as Shelley, a former Playboy bunny who signs up to be the "house mother" of an unpopular university sorority after being expelled from the Playboy Mansion. Although it received average reviews, critics were unanimously favorable towards Faris's part, most of them agreeing, according to website Rotten Tomatoes, that she was "game" in what they called a "middling, formulaic comedy." The film was released on August 22, 2008, in the US, and made US$70 million in its global theatrical run.

Faris's first movie of 2009 was the British science fiction-comedy Frequently Asked Questions About Time Travel, which follows two social outcasts and their cynical friend as they attempt to navigate a time-travel conundrum in the middle of a British pub. Faris played Cassie, a girl from the future who sets the adventure in motion. The Guardian described her appearance as a "bewildered cameo". It received a theatrical release only in the UK, and later had several television premiere airings across Europe.

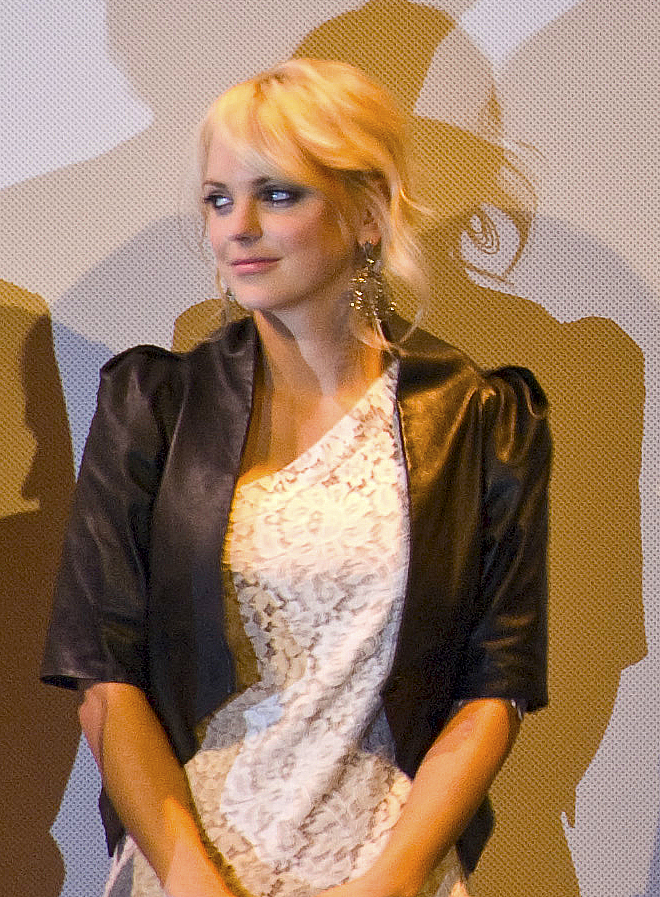
Faris at a screening for Observe and Report in 2009

In the black comedy Observe and Report (2009), Faris co-starred opposite Seth Rogen, portraying a vulgar, hard-partying cosmetic counter employee on whom Rogen has a crush. She was drawn to appear in the movie, as it gave Faris the opportunity to play an "awful character" rather than the usual "roles where you have to win the audience over or win the guy over, and be charming." Controversy arose regarding a scene where Rogen has sex with Faris's intoxicated character, with various advocacy groups commenting that it constituted date rape. Budgeted at US$18 million, Observe and Report made US$26 million. Faris voiced Sam Sparks, a weather intern and the love interest of the wannabe scientist Flint Lockwood in the animated Cloudy with a Chance of Meatballs as well as Jeanette Miller (one of the Chipettes) in the live-action hybrid Alvin and the Chipmunks: The Squeakquel, both of which were box office successes.

Faris starred in the animated live-action film Yogi Bear as a nature documentary filmmaker befriending the titular character. It was released by Warner Bros. on December 17, 2010, receiving largely negative reviews, with many critics unimpressed by its screenplay. The Hollywood Reporter, while admitting to find her "very talented" in its verdict, wondered "what on earth" made her agree to play her role. The film, however, made US$201 million worldwide.

Faris's subsequent film release was the retro comedy Take Me Home Tonight, about a group of friends partying on one summer night during the 1980s. Filmed in 2007, it received a wide theatrical release four years later, on March 4, 2011, to negative reviews and lackluster earnings. Faris, however, obtained a Teen Choice Award nomination for Choice Movie Actress – Comedy. She next had the starring part and served as executive producer of What's Your Number?, where she appeared with Chris Evans. In the movie, she played a woman who looks back at the past 19 men she has had relationships with and wonders if one of them might be her one true love. It garnered generally mediocre reviews, who concluded that the "comic timing" of Faris was "sharp as always," but felt it was wasted in "this predictable, boilerplate comedy." It was released on September 30, 2011, and made US$30 million worldwide. She also reprised her voice-over role in Alvin and the Chipmunks: Chipwrecked, released on December 16, 2011.

Her next film role was that of a human rights activist befriending a childish autocrat in the political satire The Dictator (2012), co-starring Sacha Baron Cohen. Faris, who was eager to work with Baron Cohen as she had been his fan "for years," stated that "90 percent" of the acting in the film was improvised. Critics gave it decent reviews, with Faris's role garnering a similar reception; Los Angeles Times called her "the film's standout" and stated that when "she opens her mouth, that rasp that has made her so much fun to watch (the Scary Movie franchise most memorably) takes hold and turns the dialogue inside out. The kind of true-believer purity she brings to Zoey's eco-terrorizing rants comes close to stealing Baron Cohen's comic thunder." The picture was a box office success, grossing US$179 million globally, and earned Faris the Star of the Year Award at the National Association of Theatre Owners.

=== 2013–2017: Mom and Unqualified ===
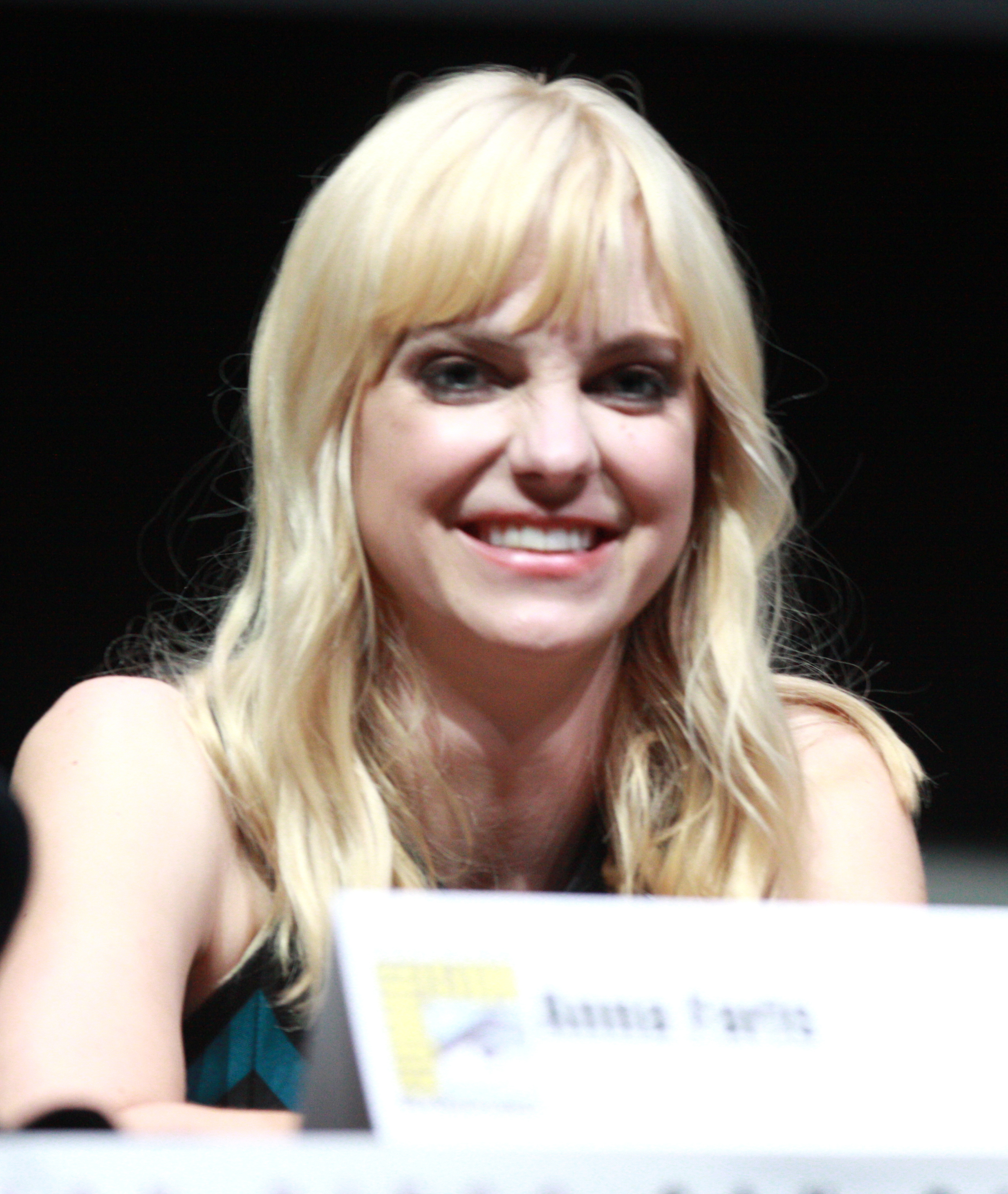
Faris at the 2013 San Diego Comic-Con

In 2013, Faris acted for the third time with then-husband Chris Pratt, following Take Me Home Tonight and What's Your Number? in a segment of Movie 43, an independent anthology black comedy that featured 14 different storylines, with each segment having a different director. The film was universally panned by critics, with the Chicago Sun-Times calling it "the Citizen Kane of awful." In the British romantic comedy I Give It a Year (2013), Faris played an old flame of a writer (Rafe Spall) who hastily tied the knot. Released shortly after Movie 43, the film received mixed reviews and was a commercial success in the UK.

Faris obtained the main role of the CBS sitcom series Mom, which debuted on September 23, 2013. Her character is Christy, a newly sober single mom who tries to pull her life together in Napa Valley. Landing the part gave Faris, who had guest-starred in various television programs until then, her first full-time television role. Throughout its eight-season run, the sitcom became the third most-watched comedy on television, and received generally favorable reviews; Vulture called her "the most talented comic actress of her generation," and Boston Herald critic, Mark A. Perigard wrote in his verdict: "This is dark material, yet Faris balances it with a genuine winsomeness, able to wring laughs out of the most innocuous lines." She has been nominated for one Prism Award and two People's Choice Awards. In 2020, Faris left the show after seven seasons.

Faris reprised her voice-role in the animated science-fiction comedy sequel Cloudy with a Chance of Meatballs 2, released in theaters four days after Mom premiered on television. Like the first film, Meatballs 2 was a commercial success, grossing US$274.3 million worldwide. The following year, she had an uncredited cameo in the closing-credits sequence of the action-comedy 22 Jump Street, appearing in a segment called 30 Jump Street: Flight Academy.

Faris and Mom co-star Allison Janney hosted the 41st People's Choice Awards, which were held January 7, 2015. In November, she launched Unqualified, a free-form advice podcast; along with producer Sim Sarna, she is the host of the show, which consists of interviews with celebrities and cultural figures, followed by personal phone-calls to listeners asking for relationship and other advice. Faris was inspired to create the podcast after listening to Serial, and explaining the evolution of the idea, she said: "I love to talk about relationships; that's all I want to talk about with my friends. And then I just thought, I kind of want a hobby [...] So I started asking around to some friends, and I asked this technical producer guy what equipment I should buy on Amazon. And I just started recording my friends when they would come over. And then with my dear friend Sim, we started flushing [sic] out the whole thing, which clearly there's still a lot more flushing [sic] out to do. It started out as a dinky hobby." As of May 2021, 249 episodes have been released.

Faris reprised her voice-over role in Alvin and the Chipmunks: The Road Chip in 2015, the fourth installment in the Alvin and the Chipmunks film series. In 2016, she had a brief appearance as an exaggerated version of herself in the action-comedy Keanu, and starred in the music video for the song "Hold on to Me" by Mondo Cozmo. She voiced one of the lead characters, Jailbreak, in the 2017 animated comedy The Emoji Movie, which was universally panned by critics.

In October 2017, Faris published her first book, Unqualified. The memoir became one of the "top 20 blockbuster books of autumn," according to Amazon, and received a positive critical response; The New York Times found the book to be "goofily self-deprecating, casually profane and occasionally raw, earnest and blunt, like Ms. Faris herself," and The Ringer remarked: "Unqualified is observant, sharp, and startlingly revealing, not only about Faris's romantic history, but of the broader discrepancies between modern male and female Hollywood stardom writ large."

=== 2018–present: Film return and recent work ===
In Overboard (2018), a remake of the 1987 film of the same name starring Goldie Hawn and Kurt Russell, Faris played a single, working-class mother who convinces a spoiled wealthy playboy (Eugenio Derbez) with amnesia that they are married. While publications such as IndieWire and Film Inquiry praised the chemistry between Derbez and Faris, most critics felt that the film made "poor use of the ever-charming" Faris. Her first leading film role since 2011's What's Your Number, Overboard was a commercial success, grossing over US$91.2 million worldwide.

Faris starred alongside Toni Collette in The Estate (2022), a black comedy about two sisters who attempt to get into good graces with their aunt before she passes to inherit her fortune. The film was critiqued for its plot, though Peter Bradshaw of The Guardian and Tomris Laffly at RogerEbert.com praised the ensemble. Faris next played a supporting role in My Spy: The Eternal City (2024), the sequel to 2020's My Spy, starring Dave Bautista. It was similarly panned, but The Guardian's Cath Clarke felt that her acting was among "some nice enough performances".

Later in 2026, Faris starred in Jon Lucas and Scott Moore's comedy feature Spa Weekend. and in Lance Oppenheim's biopic Primetime as Chris Hansen's spouse Mary Joan Hansen.

Her other upcoming projects include the Andrew Niccol film I, Object (replacing Melanie Lynskey).

== Public image ==
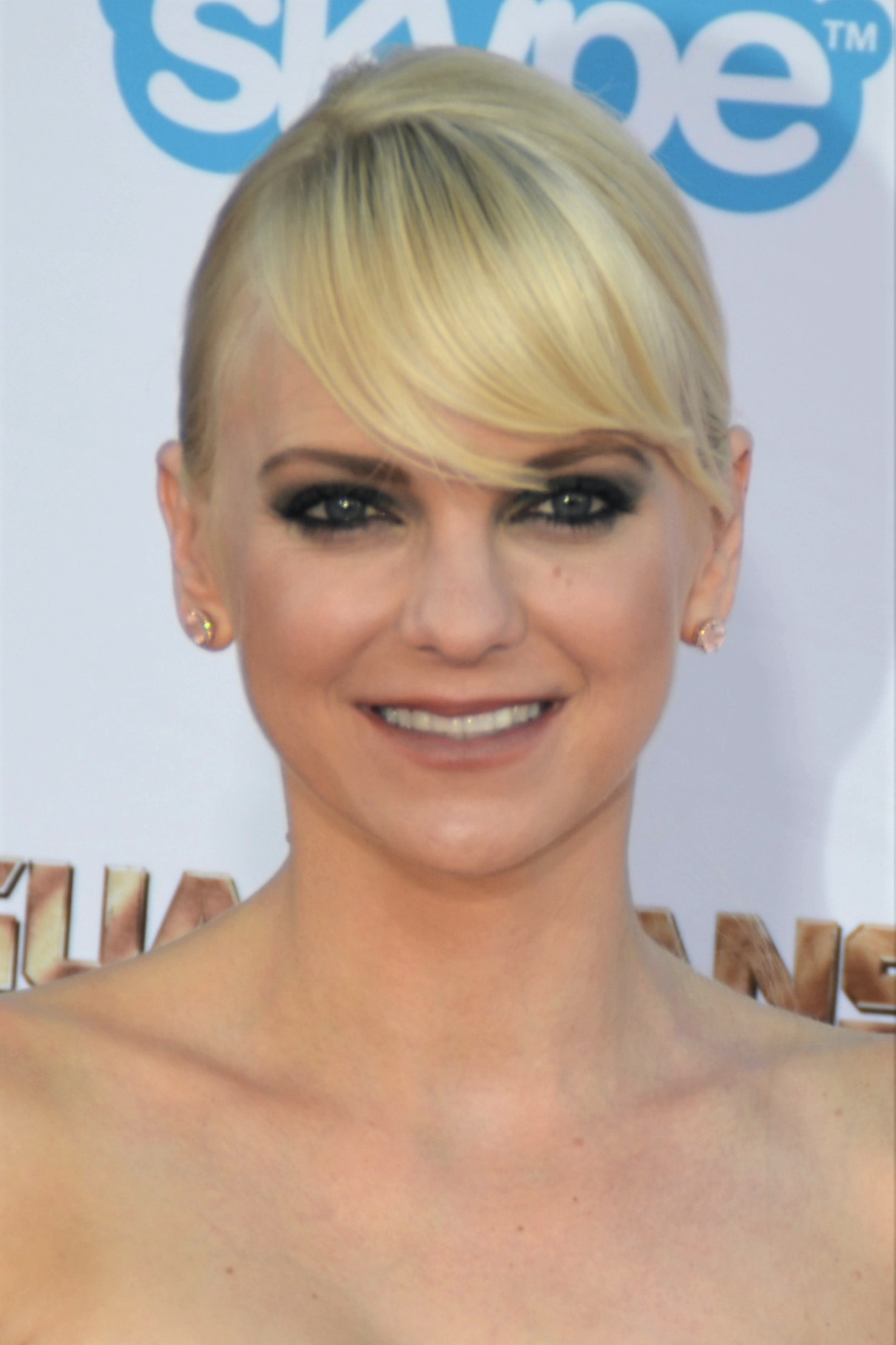
Faris at the premiere of Guardians of the Galaxy in 2014

During her career, Faris has been called one of the "most talented comedic actresses" of her generation by several publications. Cosmopolitan magazine named her "the Cosmo's Fun Fearless Female of the Year" in 2010, and Tad Friend described her in The New Yorker as "Hollywood's most original comedic actress." A Vulture article called Faris "her generation's Goldie Hawn" and she has been often compared to comedian Lucille Ball. The Wrap, likening her to Ball, asserted the actress "has impeccable timing and isn't afraid to cast dignity aside in pursuit of a hearty laugh," while NPR described her as "Hawn's heir apparent—a modern-day Lucille Ball with an up-for-anything mania and a gift for the low arts of slapstick and pulling faces."

Although some of her films received negative critical reviews or performed poorly at the box office, Faris has generally received acclaim for her performances in many of them. The A.V. Club once stated it was a "pleasure to watch" Faris on screen and described her as "a gifted, likeable comedian who tends to be the best element of many terrible movies." Slate magazine's Dana Stevens wrote in her review for Faris's vehicle What's Your Number?: "More than any contemporary comedienne I can think of [...] Faris demonstrates this fearless anything-for-a-laugh quality. It would be wonderful to see her in a movie that tested the limits of that audacity, rather than forcing her to tamp it down." Los Angeles Times remarked that Smiley Face was "an opportunity for the actress to show that she can carry a movie composed of often hilarious nonstop misadventures. No matter how outrageously or foolishly Faris' Jane behaves, she remains blissfully appealing—such are Faris' fearless comedic skills and the freshness of her radiant blond beauty."

Faris has appeared on the covers and photo sessions of several magazines throughout her career; she graced the September 2000 cover of Raygun, and in subsequent years the list has included Playboy, Self, Redbook, Good Housekeeping, Parade, Women's Health, Paper, Cosmopolitan, among others. She was featured in GQ UK's June 2001 pictorial of "Young Hollywood." She has been listed as No. 57, No. 39, No. 42 and No. 44 in Maxim magazine's "Hot 100" in 2004, 2009, 2010 and 2011 respectively. In 2009, she was ranked No. 60 in FHM's "100 Sexiest Women in the World," and ranked No. 96 on the same list in 2010. Ask Men also featured her as No. 78 on its 2009 "100 Most Desirable Women in the World" list.

== Personal life ==
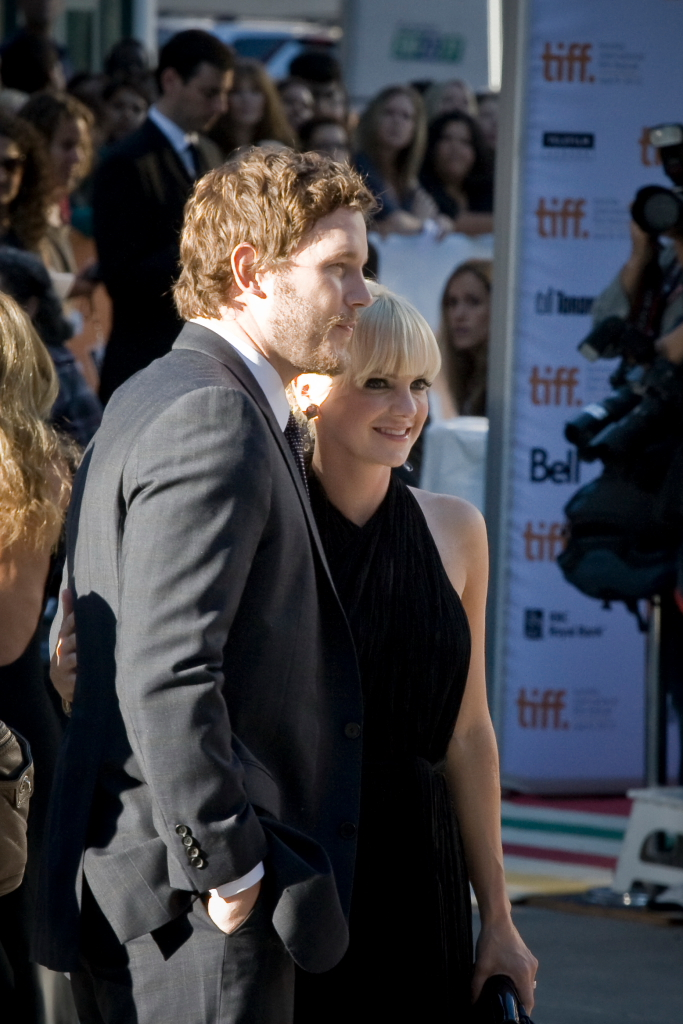
Faris with then-husband Chris Pratt at the 2011 Toronto International Film Festival

Faris started dating actor Ben Indra shortly after they met on the set of the 1999 indie slasher film Lovers Lane. They married in June 2004. Faris filed for divorce in April 2007 citing irreconcilable differences. As part of their divorce agreement in February 2008, she agreed to pay Indra $900,000 in addition to other property and acting royalties.

During her divorce from Indra and after filming The House Bunny, Faris got breast implants, which she first revealed in an interview with The New Yorker in April 2011. She said it "wasn't a career thing—it was a divorce thing", and recalled in her memoir Unqualified that she had previously been insecure about her breasts.

Faris met actor Chris Pratt in early 2007 at the table-read in Los Angeles for the film Take Me Home Tonight where their characters were love interests. They started dating shortly after, became engaged in late 2008, and married on July 9, 2009, in a small ceremony in Bali, Indonesia, eloping on a whim after a friend's wedding. They have a son who was born in 2012, nine weeks premature and spent a month in intensive care before going home. The family lived in the Hollywood Hills, Los Angeles. On August 6, 2017, the couple announced their separation, and filed for divorce on December 1, 2017. On October 16, 2018, it was announced that it had been finalized.

In September 2017, Faris reportedly began dating cinematographer Michael Barrett, whom she met while working on the film Overboard. In a February 2020 appearance on The Late Late Show with James Corden, she confirmed rumors of their engagement. In 2021, she confirmed they had married in a courthouse ceremony in Washington State.

During Thanksgiving dinner in 2019, Faris and her guests experienced mysterious health symptoms in a Lake Tahoe rental cottage. Local first responders detected carbon monoxide levels six times the recommended maximum.

On January 8, 2025, Faris lost her home in Pacific Palisades, Los Angeles, due to the Palisades Fire.

== Philanthropy ==
In 2015, Faris and her then husband donated $1 million to a charity that provided eyeglasses to underprivileged children. The donation was allegedly inspired by Faris' son who was born premature and visually impaired. She also donated to the neonatal intensive care unit of the Cedars-Sinai Medical Center in Los Angeles and supported March of Dimes, which works to end premature births, birth defects, and infant mortality.

In 2017, Anna Faris, Allison Janney, and Chuck Lorre made a combined $250,000 donation to Planned Parenthood Los Angeles in lieu of a "For Your Consideration" Emmy campaign.

Since 2021 Faris has supported the Global Alliance to Prevent Prematurity and Stillbirth (GAPPS), promoting fundraisers on her personal social media accounts and through her podcast.

== Filmography ==
Key
†	Denotes films that have not yet been released

=== Film ===
Year	Title	Role	Notes
1996	Eden	Dithy	
2000	Lovers Lane	Jannelle Bay	
2000	Scary Movie	Cindy Campbell	
2001	Scary Movie 2	Cindy Campbell	
2002	May	Polly	
2002	The Hot Chick	April	
2003	Winter Break	Justine	
2003	Lost in Translation	Kelly	
2003	Scary Movie 3	Cindy Campbell	
2005	Southern Belles	Belle Scott	
2005	Waiting...	Serena	
2005	Brokeback Mountain	Lashawn Malone	
2005	Just Friends	Samantha James	
2006	Scary Movie 4	Cindy Campbell	
2006	My Super Ex-Girlfriend	Hannah Lewis	
2006	Guilty Hearts	Jane Conelly	
2007	Smiley Face	Jane F.	
2007	Mama's Boy	Nora Flanagan	
2008	The House Bunny	Shelley Darlington	Also producer
2008	The Spleenectomy	Danielle / Dr. Fields	Short film
2009	Frequently Asked Questions About Time Travel	Cassie	
2009	Observe and Report	Brandi	
2009	Cloudy with a Chance of Meatballs	Sam Sparks	Voice
2009	Alvin and the Chipmunks: The Squeakquel	Jeanette Miller	Voice
2010	Yogi Bear	Rachel Johnson	
2011	Take Me Home Tonight	Wendy Franklin	
2011	What's Your Number?	Ally Darling	Also executive producer
2011	Alvin and the Chipmunks: Chipwrecked	Jeanette Miller	Voice
2012	The Dictator	Zoey	
2013	Movie 43	Julie	
2013	I Give It a Year	Chloe	
2013	Cloudy with a Chance of Meatballs 2	Sam Sparks	Voice
2014	22 Jump Street	Anna	Uncredited cameo
2015	Alvin and the Chipmunks: The Road Chip	Jeanette Miller	Voice
2016	Keanu	Herself	Cameo
2017	The Emoji Movie	Jailbreak / Princess Linda	Voice
2018	Overboard	Kate Sullivan	
2022	The Estate	Savanna	
2024	My Spy: The Eternal City	Nancy	
2026	Scary Movie	Cindy Campbell	
2026	I, Object	Abigail	
2026	Spa Weekend	Sophie	
2026	Primetime	Mary Joan Hansen	

=== Television ===
Year	Title	Role	Notes
1991	Deception: A Mother's Secret	Liz	Television film
2002, 2004	King of the Hill	Kathryn / Lisa / Stoned Hippie Chick	Voice, 2 episodes
2004	Friends	Erica	Recurring role (season 10), 5 episodes
2004	Mad TV	Herself	2 episodes
2005	Blue Skies	Sarah	Unaired pilot
2007	Entourage	Herself	3 episodes
2008	The Girls Next Door	Herself	Episode: "House
2008, 2011	Saturday Night Live	Herself	"Anna Faris/Duffy" (34.3), "Anna Faris/Drake" (37.4)
2013–2020	Mom	Christy Plunkett	Lead role (seasons 1–7), 152 episodes
2018	The Joel McHale Show with Joel McHale	Sandy	Episode: "Bitterness and Disappointment"
2021	HouseBroken	Lil' Bunny, Chartreuse	Voice, 2 episodes
2022	The Simpsons	Ashley the Female Hacker	Voice, episode: "Lisa the Boy Scout"
2024	It's Florida, Man	Whitney	Episode: "Mermaids"
2025	Phineas and Ferb	Samantha Sweetwater	Voice, episode: "Book Flub"
2025	Krapopolis	Queen Nanini	Voice, episode: "Society of Swords"

=== Podcasts ===
Year	Title	Role	Notes
2015–2023	Anna Faris is Unqualified	Herself	Creator and host, 249 episodes
2023	The Peepkins	Commander Hatch	Lead role, 6 episodes

== Discography ==
Year	Album	Track	Label	Ref.
2003	Lost in Translation	"Nobody Does It Better"	Emperor Norton Records	
2005	Just Friends	"Forgiveness"	New Line Records	
2005	Just Friends	"Love from Afar"	New Line Records	
2007	Mama's Boy	"Old-Fashioned Girl"	Lakeshore Records	
2007	Mama's Boy	"Bad Bath and Bullshit"	Lakeshore Records	

== Bibliography ==
- Faris, Anna; with foreword by Pratt, Chris (2017). Unqualified. HarperCollins. ISBN 9780008239220. (New York Times Best Seller; Goodreads Choice Award nominee for humor)

== Awards and nominations ==
Year (Note: Indicates the year of ceremony. Each year is linked to the article about the awards held that year, wherever possible.)	Award	Category	Work	Result
2001	MTV Movie Awards	Best Kiss (Note: Shared with Jon Abrahams)	Scary Movie	Nominated
2001	MTV Movie Awards	Breakthrough Female Performance	Scary Movie	Nominated
2004	Gold Derby Awards	Best Guest Actress in a Comedy Series	Friends	Nominated
2004	Fangoria Chainsaw Awards	Best Supporting Actress	May	Won
2006	Screen Actors Guild Awards	Outstanding Performance by a Cast in a Motion Picture	Brokeback Mountain	Nominated
2006	MTV Movie Awards	Best Kiss (Note: Shared with Chris Marquette)	Just Friends	Nominated
2006	Teen Choice Awards	Choice Hissy Fit	Just Friends	Nominated
2006	Teen Choice Awards	Choice Liplock	Just Friends	Nominated
2006	Fangoria Chainsaw Awards	Chick You Don't Wanna Mess With (Best Heroine)	Scary Movie 4	Nominated
2007	MTV Movie Awards	Best Fight (Note: Shared with Uma Thurman)	My Super Ex-Girlfriend	Nominated
2007	Stony Awards	Stonette of the Year	Smiley Face	Won
2009	MTV Movie Awards	Best Comedic Performance	The House Bunny	Nominated
2011	Teen Choice Awards	Choice Movie Actress – Comedy	Take Me Home Tonight	Nominated
2012	American Movie Awards	Star of the Year Award	The Dictator	Won
2014	People's Choice Awards	Favorite Actress in a New Television Series	Mom	Nominated
2016	People's Choice Awards	Favorite Comedic Television Actress	Mom	Nominated
2017	People's Choice Awards	Favorite Comedic Television Actress	Mom	Nominated
2017	Shorty Awards	Best Podcast	Unqualified	Won
2018	Teen Choice Awards	Choice Movie Actress – Comedy	Overboard	Nominated
2019	iHeartRadio Podcast Awards	Best Comedy Podcast	Unqualified	Nominated
