= My Favorite Murder =

True crime comedy podcast

- Genre: True crime; comedy
- Language: English

Cast and voices
- Hosted by: Georgia Hardstark; Karen Kilgariff

Publication
- Original release: January 13, 2016
- Provider: Exactly Right Podcast Network
- Updates: Weekly on Thursdays, minisodes on Mondays

Reception
- Ratings: 35 million per month

Related
- Website: www.myfavoritemurder.com

My Favorite Murder is a weekly true crime comedy podcast hosted by American comedians Karen Kilgariff and Georgia Hardstark. The first episode was released in January 2016. The podcast debuted at #25 on the iTunes podcast charts and peaked at #3 on April 27, 2018. Weekly episodes regularly land within the iTunes' Top 10 Comedy Podcast chart. As of 2020, the podcast gets 35 million downloads per month.

== History ==
Kilgariff and Hardstark met at a Halloween party in 2014 where Kilgariff was describing a violent car accident she had witnessed at South by Southwest. Hardstark approached Kilgariff, finding they had a shared interest in true crime. Prior to the podcast, Kilgariff was best known for her stand-up, which included singing and playing guitar to original comedic songs. Kilgariff also previously worked on Mr. Show, The Pete Holmes Show, and Ellen. Hardstark co-hosted the shows Drinks With Alie and Georgia and Slumber Party with Alie and Georgia with previous collaborator Alie Ward.

In January 2016, Kilgariff and Hardstark released their first episode of My Favorite Murder with Feral Audio, where they discussed the cases of JonBenét Ramsey and the Golden State Killer. Shortly thereafter, My Favorite Murder appeared on an episode of the Cracked podcast. In June 2016, Steven Ray Morris became the podcast's producer, making his first appearance in Episode 23 "Making A Twenty-Thirderer."

In 2017, Feral Audio was shut down following abuse allegations made against the founder. In September 2017, My Favorite Murder moved to Midroll Media. On November 28, 2018, Kilgariff and Hardstark introduced their new podcast network Exactly Right (named after a phrase often said on the podcast by Kilgariff).

In January 2022, Amazon and Wondery acquired exclusive rights to the My Favorite Murder podcast. The acquisition was part of an exclusive ad sales and distribution deal with the podcast's parent network, Exactly Right. The deal stipulated that episodes of My Favorite Murder and some episodes from other podcasts on the Exactly Right Network would be published one week early on Amazon Music and Wondery+ before being released on other podcast platforms.

In Episode 409 "You Were Exactly Right," and on the podcast's official Instagram account — both released on January 4, 2024 — the show announced that they had severed ties with Amazon Music and Wondery.

On January 26, 2026, the podcast began appearing on Netflix.

== Format and structure ==
Kilgariff and Hardstark each select a single murder, true crime story, survivor story, or historical event to recount and discuss. The podcast consists mainly of dialogue between the hosts with one host telling the story and the other host reacting and providing commentary. Episodes were initially thematically based, though this concept was abandoned early in the series. Episodes 1-32 were titled with murder-themed puns and pop culture references. From then on, episode titles were based on jokes from the conversations within the episodes. While the show traditionally consists only of Kilgariff, Hardstark and producer Steven Ray Morris, a few episodes have featured guest appearances. Past guests have included Guy Branum, Paul Holes, Patton Oswalt, Bellamy Young, Conan O'Brien, and Cameron Britton, among others. Additionally, My Favorite Murder has collaborated with other podcasts, including the Cracked podcast, Unqualified with Anna Faris, The Dollop, Harmontown, Disgraceland and Movie Crush. Karen Kilgariff was also on Mother, May I Sleep With Podcast in an episode on the movie Flowers in the Attic.

Full episodes are released weekly on Thursdays, ranging in length from 60 to 120 minutes. "Minisodes" are released Mondays, and are typically 30–45 minutes long. Minisodes initially focused solely on "Hometown Murders," which include listeners' personal connections or experiences with crime submitted via email. Minisodes have since expanded also to include topics such as the paranormal, hidden objects, family secrets, first responder stories, or whatever topics the hosts have personally requested for.

Kilgariff and Hardstark have both referred to the podcast as a sort of therapy to deal with their own anxieties about true crime. They often discuss common problematic themes in true crime, such as mental illness, sex work, sexual abuse, religion, women's rights, and victim's rights. Within the discussion of the crimes, they also discuss personal experiences and anecdotes. These topics often include previous substance abuse, Irish Catholicism, Judaism, sobriety, therapy/mental health, epilepsy, stand-up comedy, and growing up in California.

Each episode ends with the hosts saying their catchphrase "Stay Sexy and Don't Get Murdered." Hardstark then asks her siamese cat Elvis: "Elvis, do you want a cookie?" and he meows into the microphone as the episode ends. After their move to the Exactly Right offices, Hardstark recorded Elvis on her phone at home, and it was then added to the end of the podcast in post-production. Elvis died in December 2020, though his recording is still played after each episode.

== Reactions and response ==
My Favorite Murder was swiftly syndicated beyond the original Feral Audio site to such places as Google Play Music and iTunes. Media reaction to the program has been largely positive, with the phenomenon of the podcast's rapid popularity documented in many outside sources such as BuzzFeed, Rolling Stone, Marie Claire, HuffPost, and Bustle.

As of October 5, 2016, My Favorite Murder was #10 on the overall iTunes podcast charts and #1 in the comedy category, and has around 450,000 downloads per episode as well as millions of downloads each month.

Elle invited Hardstark to write about the JonBenét Ramsey case following The Case of: JonBenét Ramsey to discuss her reaction and share her theories on the case.

On February 21, 2017, The Atlantic published the article titled "How a True-Crime Podcast Became a Mental-Health Support Group" which discusses the "Murderino" community built around taking care of yourself, and how stories of murders have come to help listeners exorcize their fears.

The show has faced some criticism, notably with regard to their treatment of topics relating to marginalized groups (such as sex workers, people of color, and the LGBTQ+ community), their prioritization of crimes against white women over crimes against women of color, as well as factual inaccuracies. Many episodes include a "Corrections Corner" segment to address criticisms or correct inaccuracies from previous episodes.

In 2019 Forbes named them #2 on their first-ever ranking of the highest-earning podcasters. In 2019, My Favorite Murder earned $15 million.

== Murderinos and Fan Cult ==
My Favorite Murder quickly gained a large fan following, including a Facebook group with over 200,000 members as of April 2018, and a Facebook fan page with more than 171,000 followers as of February 2018. Of note is the predominance of female listeners and fans, which is consistent with data showing the majority of true crime fans to be female.

Fans of the show refer to themselves as "Murderinos," which they define as: "Person with a borderline obsessive interest in true crime, and the specific nature and details of disturbing murders." The term "Murderino" is loosely inspired by a Ned Flanders line from a Halloween episode of The Simpsons.

On April 12, 2018 My Favorite Murder announced their new platform for fans called the Fan Cult. For a yearly fee, fans are granted access to exclusive merchandise, pre-sale of live show tickets, additional content, and forums.

In November 2019, My Favorite Murder hosted a weekend-long event called "My Favorite Weekend" in Santa Barbara, California.

== I'll Be Gone in the Dark ==
I'll Be Gone in the Dark: One Woman's Obsessive Search for the Golden State Killer is a true crime book by Michelle McNamara about the Golden State Killer. The book and McNamara's work on the case are frequently discussed in My Favorite Murder, which boasts a large fan base of true crime aficionados. The debut episode of the show "Episode 1: My Firstest Murder" featured the case as well as discussion of McNamara's work. Prior to the arrest, "Episode 115: I'll Be Gone In The Dark at Skylight Books" featured McNamara's widower Patton Oswalt, Paul Haynes, and Billy Jensen discussing the book and their roles in finishing the project following McNamara's death. In this episode, Oswalt discusses McNamara's writing process, including making "era-appropriate playlists to help her get into a proper mindset." Oswalt explains finishing of the book as a bittersweet experience: "It’s another part of her that’s kind of gone. In a very a sick way, not having the book done—and us working on it—meant she was still here.”

"Episode 118: Golden State Serial Killer Caught" released on April 26, 2018 (immediately after the arrest was made) and featured Billy Jensen discussing the arrest and his work on the book following McNamara's death. "Episode 122: Surprise! It's Paul Holes" featured Billy Jensen and Golden State Killer investigator Paul Holes discussing the case and the impact of McNamara's work.

Following their involvement in the Golden State Killer case and McNamara's work, in 2019 Billy Jensen and Paul Holes began a podcast called Jensen & Holes: The Murder Squad, produced through Kilgariff and Hardstark's podcast network Exactly Right.

== Stay Sexy and Don't Get Murdered ==
Hosts Kilgariff and Hardstark co-wrote a book titled Stay Sexy and Don't Get Murdered that was released on May 28, 2019, by Forge Books. The book is a dual memoir, framed by their signature focus on true crime. The book title is a reference to the podcast's catchphrase.

== Exactly Right Podcast Network ==
In November 2018, Kilgariff and Hardstark departed from Earwolf and launched the Exactly Right Podcast Network. The name of the network is in reference to a phrase often said by Kilgariff in the show. In addition to producing My Favorite Murder, the network began hosting the pre-existing shows The Fall Line, The Purrrcast, This Podcast Will Kill You, and Do You Need A Ride?.

In 2019, Exactly Right podcast Jensen & Holes: The Murder Squad was announced, which was the first show original to the network. The show is hosted by retired cold case investigator Paul Holes and investigative journalist Billy Jensen. Jensen and Holes discuss "unsolved murders, unidentified remains, and missing persons cases" with contributions from their listeners. Both Jensen and Holes gained notoriety within the My Favorite Murder fan community following their involvement in the Golden State Killer case in 2018. The podcast was later canceled in 2022 due to sexual misconduct allegations against Jensen.

Additional podcasts hosted by the network include I Said No Gifts, in which comedian Bridger Winegar has conversations with guests who have brought him supposedly unwanted gifts, and Bananas, wherein Kurt Braunohler and Scotty Landes discuss the strange news from around the world. Exactly Right's lineup continues to expand with shows such as Adulting with Michelle Buteau and Jordan Carlos, That's Messed Up: An SVU Podcast, I Saw What You Did, author Kate Winkler Dawson's Tenfold More Wicked, Lady to Lady, Parent Footprint with Dr. Dan and Dave Holmes' limited series Waiting for Impact.

== Live shows ==
The hosts have done several live shows internationally that follow the same format of the podcast, starting in September 2016. Vince Averill, Hardstark's husband, acts as the tour manager and travels with the show. Live shows are often posted in place of new episodes. My Favorite Murder is the top-selling podcast live show.

== See also ==
- List of American crime podcasts
