= Karen Kilgariff =

American comedian, writer and podcaster

- Kilgariff in 2017
- Born: May 11, 1970 (age 56); Petaluma, California, U.S.
- Notable work: My Favorite Murder Podcast Co-Host, Co-founder of Exactly Right Podcast Network

Comedy career
- Years active: 1990–present

Karen Kilgariff (born May 11, 1970, in Petaluma, California) is an American writer, comedian, singer, author, actress, television producer, and podcast host. She began her career as a stand-up comedian in the early 1990s and later became a television actress, most notably as a cast member on Mr. Show. She has written for many comedy television shows, including being the head writer on The Rosie Show, The Ellen DeGeneres Show and The Pete Holmes Show.

Since 2016, she has co-hosted the true crime comedy podcast My Favorite Murder along with Georgia Hardstark. In 2018, she and Hardstark co-founded the podcast network Exactly Right. Along with Hardstark, Kilgariff wrote the non-fiction book Stay Sexy and Don't Get Murdered, which was released on May 28, 2019.

== Early life ==
Karen Kilgariff grew up outside Petaluma, California with her mother Patricia (née Knight), who died in 2016, her father Jim, and her older sister Laura. Both of Karen's parents worked; her father was a San Francisco firefighter and her mother was a head psychiatric nurse at the Langley Porter Psychiatric Institute. She attended St. Vincent de Paul High School in Petaluma.

== Career ==
=== Stand-up and acting ===
Karen Kilgariff started out as a stand-up comedian in Sacramento in the 1990s. She went on to land comedy roles on television, including being a cast member on seasons 3 and 4 of Mr. Show. She would later appear in the 2015 reboot, W/ Bob & David, as well. She played the role of Jean Pettengill for five episodes of The Book Group in 2003.

In 2015, Kilgariff teamed up with Drennon Davis to record a live album of comedy songs titled I Don't Care, I Like It.

=== Writing career ===
In 2003, Kilgariff was hired by Ellen DeGeneres to help write for her comedy special, Ellen DeGeneres: Here and Now. Kilgariff later toured with DeGeneres as her opening act. Kilgariff was then named head writer for the day time talk show The Ellen DeGeneres Show, which launched in September 2003. She occasionally appeared on screen in sketches and other segments. She was also part of a comic duo (with Mary Lynn Rajskub) called Girls Guitar Club.

Kilgariff served as the head writer for The Rosie Show, which aired on the Oprah Winfrey Network. She later served as the head writer for The Pete Holmes Show, which aired on TBS.

She also wrote for and starred in truTV's Talk Show: The Game Show and produced Making History on FOX Broadcasting Company.

Kilgariff wrote four episodes for FX’s comedy-drama Baskets between 2017 and 2019.

=== Podcast hosting ===
In 2014, Kilgariff started a podcast with comedian Chris Fairbanks called Do You Need A Ride?. The podcast originally took place entirely in a car, where Karen and Chris would speak to their guest while driving around. Citing safety concerns, however, they now occasionally record at the Exactly Right Studios. In 2016, Kilgariff and Georgia Hardstark started the true-crime podcast My Favorite Murder, in which they discuss various infamous murders and serial killers. Since its inception, the podcast has garnered a large fan base, totaling over 19 million listeners. They have also toured the United States and internationally performing My Favorite Murder live shows. In 2018, she and Hardstark co-founded the podcast network Exactly Right, which now produces their podcast along with ten others. In April 2019, the network's first original podcast Jensen and Holes: The Murder Squad debuted at number one.

In 2019, Kilgariff and Hardstark published Stay Sexy and Don't Get Murdered, a joint memoir. In 2025, Kilgariff won the IHeartRadio Best Overall Ensemble award, for her podcast My Favorite Murder.

In January 2026, she began appearing on Netflix on an exclusive video podcasting deal for My Favorite Murder.

== Personal life ==
Kilgariff does not drink alcohol, and has been open about her past struggles with abuse of amphetamines and diet pills. In an interview with Marc Maron for his WTF podcast, she said she stopped using drugs and alcohol completely after she began having seizures, fearing her drug use had been the cause. Karen now lives in Studio City, California with her dogs, Frank and Blossom. Kilgariff married at age 32 and is now divorced.

== Discography ==
In 2014, Kilgariff recorded a musical comedy album Live at the Bootleg.

Singer / Songwriter
Year	Album	Song
2014	Karen Kilgariff - Live at the Bootleg	I Want to Win
2014	Karen Kilgariff - Live at the Bootleg	Solid 9
2014	Karen Kilgariff - Live at the Bootleg	Password
2014	Karen Kilgariff - Live at the Bootleg	Chelsea Guitars
2014	Karen Kilgariff - Live at the Bootleg	Look at Your Phone
2014	Karen Kilgariff - Live at the Bootleg	Business Situation
2014	Karen Kilgariff - Live at the Bootleg	AOK
2014	Karen Kilgariff - Live at the Bootleg	Gimme Mine
2014	Karen Kilgariff - Live at the Bootleg	Jesus Walks
2014	Karen Kilgariff - Live at the Bootleg	Golly Gee
2014	Karen Kilgariff - Live at the Bootleg	Drink My Way Through Christmas
