= Georgia Hardstark =

American broadcaster (born 1980)

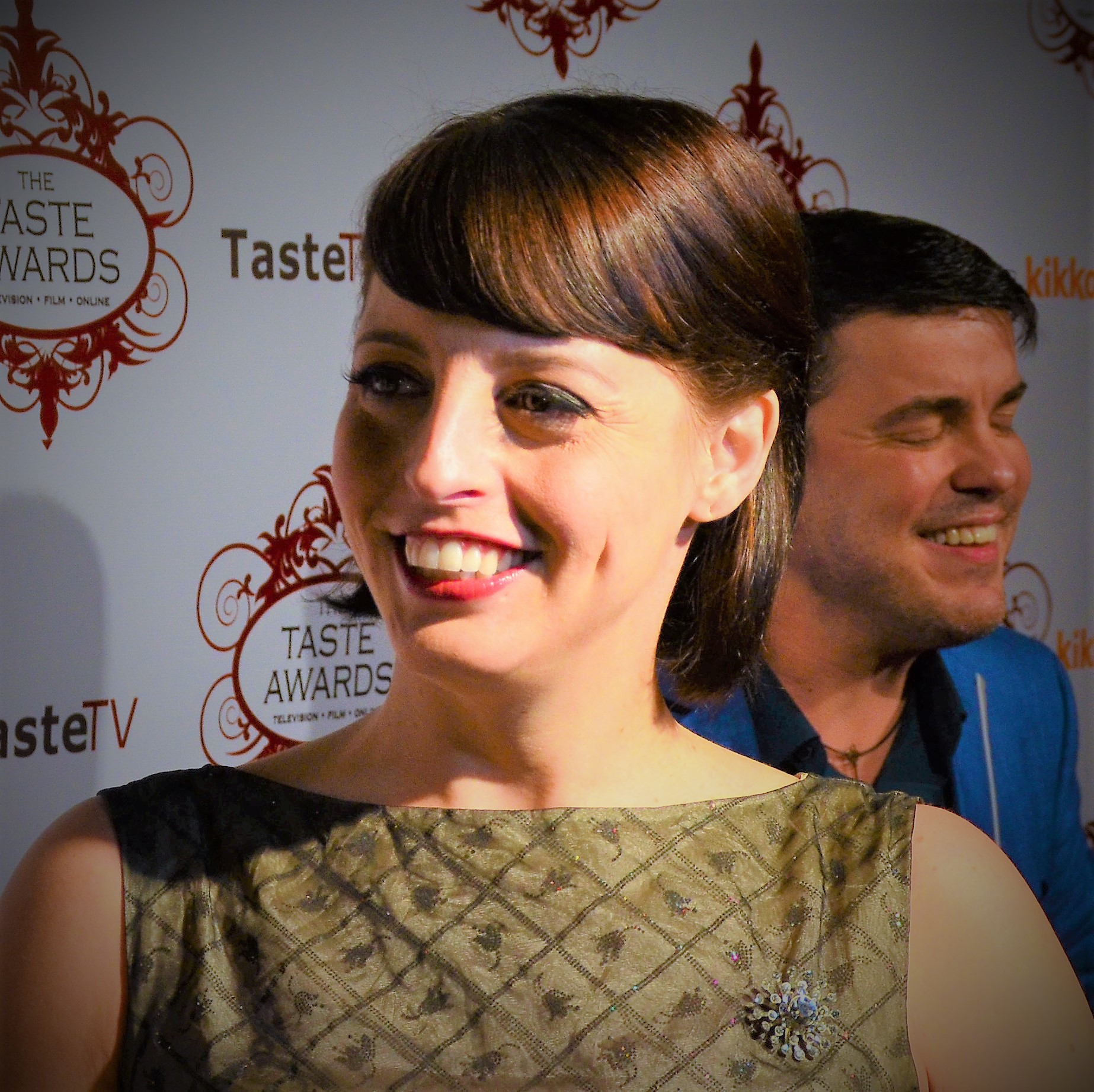
- Hardstark at 2015 Taste Awards
- Born: Georgia Hardstark; June 8, 1980 (age 46); Irvine, California, U.S.
- Occupations: Podcast host, writer, actress
- Years active: 2009–present
- Spouse: Vince Averill (married 2016–present)

Georgia Hardstark (born June 8, 1980) is an American television host and podcast personality. She is the co-host of the true crime-comedy podcast My Favorite Murder along with comedian Karen Kilgariff. In 2018, Hardstark and Kilgariff co-founded the Exactly Right Podcast Network. Together, Hardstark and Kilgariff also wrote a joint memoir published in May 2019 called Stay Sexy and Don't Get Murdered.

Hardstark initially achieved notoriety while collaborating with Alie Ward on Cooking Channel programs Tripping Out with Alie & Georgia, Unique Sweets, and Classy Ladies, as well as the Feral Audio podcast Slumber Party with Alie & Georgia.

== Early life ==
Hardstark was born in Irvine, California, to parents Martin and Janet Hardstark. She has two older siblings, Asher and Leah. At age five, her parents divorced. Growing up, Hardstark lived with her mother, while her father had custody every other weekend and two weeks out of the summer.

She is quite open about her past struggles growing up. At age 13, she started regularly doing meth and developed an eating disorder. One day, she was caught doing meth at school and was sent to rehab. She spent two weeks there, including her 14th birthday. After being discharged, she started using again but quit on her own, crediting Ray Bradbury's book The Martian Chronicles as having saved her.

Hardstark graduated high school in 1998 and promptly moved to Los Angeles to live with her grandmother. She attended beauty school for three months before dropping out. She then attended community college for a while before discovering blogging and decided to drop out of college and quit her receptionist job to pursue a career in entertainment.

== Career ==
=== Hardstark and Ward ===
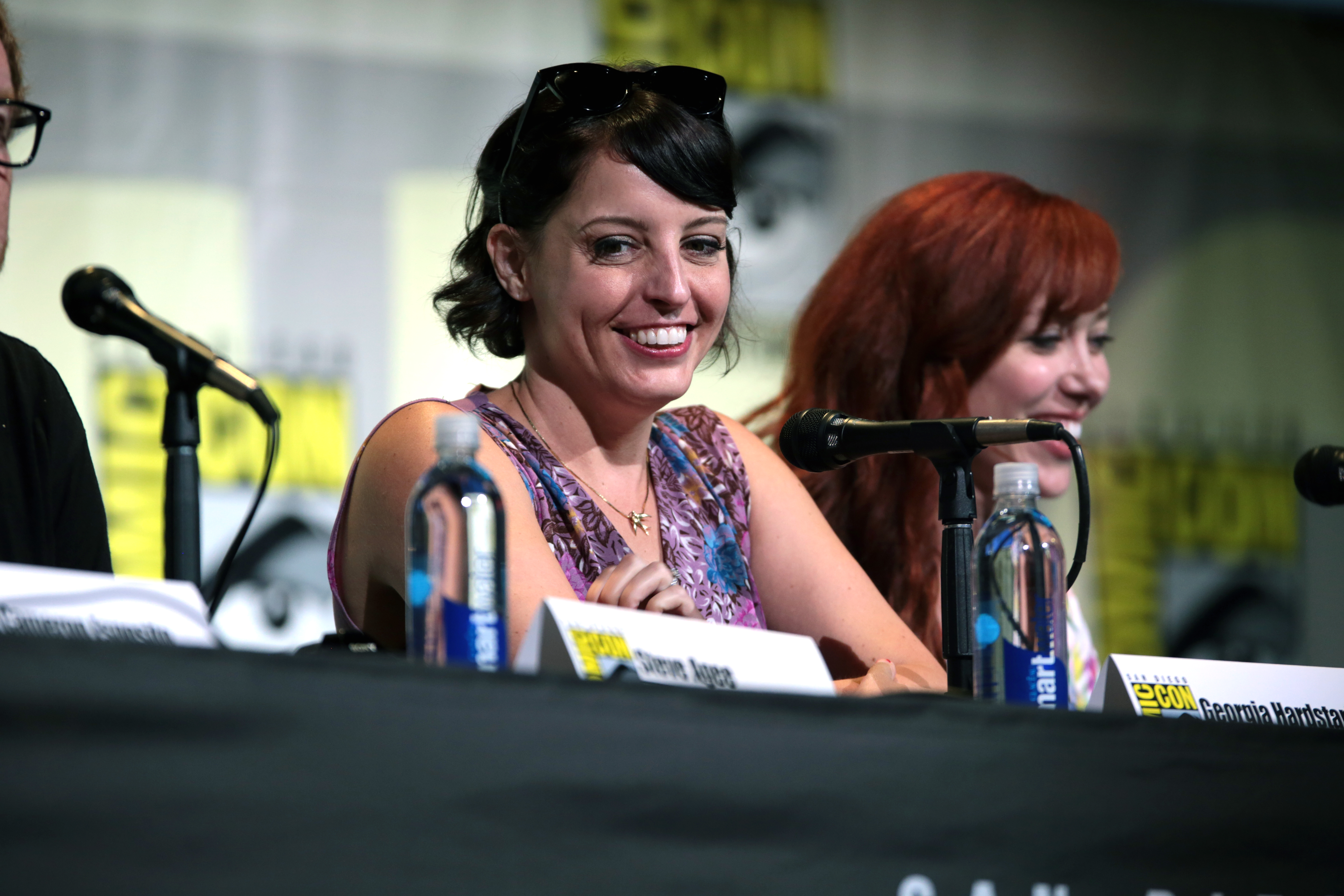
Hardstark and Ward in 2016

In 2009, while still working at her receptionist job, Hardstark and her friend, Alie Ward, created a drink called the McNuggetini. She blogged about it on a website called This Recording, and shortly after, Hardstark and Ward recorded an instructional video on how to make the drink. According to Hardstark, after the video blew-up on YouTube, someone from the Cooking Channel sent the pair a Facebook message asking if they would record more instructional cocktail videos online. Given that message, Hardstark quit her receptionist job to pursue this new career path.

The pair appeared on shows such as Drinks with Alie and Georgia, Unique Sweets, and the web series Classy Ladies with Alie Ward and Georgia Hardstark. They were in the travel series Tripping Out with Alie and Georgia and Food's Greatest Hits.

In October 2016, their book, Vintage Cocktails with a Twist: 75 Traditional and Reinvented Drinks, was released by Page Street Publishing.

Hardstark co-hosted a podcast with Ward called Slumber Party with Alie & Georgia, through Feral Audio. In 2016, the series began airing on Fullscreen. The last episode was posted on January 18, 2017. The pair have not formally acknowledged the end of the show nor the apparent abrupt end to their partnership.

=== Hardstark and Kilgariff ===
In 2016, Hardstark and Karen Kilgariff co-created the podcast My Favorite Murder.

Beginning in May 2016, it achieved very high ratings on the iTunes comedy podcast rankings, appearing as high as #1. As of August 8, 2017, it was ranked #3 on the iTunes comedy charts. In its 2016 year-end issue, Entertainment Weekly ranked it the second best podcast of the year. The show was broadcast on the Feral Audio network until September 2017, when it moved to Midroll Media. In 2018, Hardstark and Kilgariff co-founded the podcast network Exactly Right, which now produces their podcast along with several others.

A joint memoir by Hardstark and Kilgariff, titled Stay Sexy and Don't Get Murdered, was released on May 28, 2019.

On January 26, 2026, she began appearing on Netflix, along with Kilgariff, on an exclusive video podcasting deal for My Favorite Murder.

== Personal life ==
In March 2016, she married comedian Vince Averill, best known for his podcast We Watch Wrestling. The couple reside in California along with their three cats, Mimi, Dottie, and Moses ("Moe") and their dog, Cookie. They previously had another cat named Elvis who died in December 2020. Hardstark considered having children, but decided against it, as she has said on the My Favorite Murder podcast and when she was a guest on the Spermcast.

Hardstark is a public advocate of therapy. She has seen a therapist since she was six due to her parents' divorce. Hardstark has also gone to couples therapy with her husband and co-therapy with Karen Kilgariff to maintain a healthy work relationship and friendship. She has been diagnosed with generalized anxiety disorder, depression, ADHD, and OCD.

== Filmography ==
Year	Title	Role	Notes
2011	This Week in Comedy	Self	2 episodes
2011	Bitchin' Kitchen	Self	Episode: "Xmas Special"
2012-	Classy Ladies with Alie Ward and Georgia Hardstark	Self - Co-hostess	20 episodes
2013-	Tripping Out with Alie and Georgia	Self - Co-hostess	6 episodes
2014	Nerdterms	Self	2 episodes
2014	Giada at Home	Self	2 episodes
2015	Drinks with Alie and Georgia	Self - Co-hostess	30 episodes
2016	Doughboys	Self - Guest	Episode: "Mimi's Cafe with Georgia Hardstark"
2016	Slumber Party with Alie & Georgia	Self - Co-hostess	23 episodes
2016	Food's Greatest Hits	Self	6 episodes
2016	Harmontown	Self	Episode: "JonBenét Gacy"
2011-17	Unique Sweets	Self - Co-hostess, Classy Ladies	63 Episodes
2017	Inside Joke at Moontower	Self	Episode: "My Favorite Murder: Karen Kilgariff and Georgia Hardstark"
2017	The Real O'Neals	Mother	Episode: "The Real Acceptance"
2017	Life on Hold	Lawyer	Episode: "Job Interview"
2018	Drunk History	Self - Narrator	2 episodes
2018	Fresh Off the Boat	Customer #3	Episode: "We Need to Talk about Evan"
2019	CBS This Morning	Self - Author	Episode: "27.106"
2019	Tuca & Bertie		Episode: "Plumage"
2020	In Bed with Nick and Megan	Self - Guest	Episode: "Murder with Karen Kilgariff and Georgia Hardstark"
2020	Craig of the Creek	Courtney	4 episodes
