= The Road to Cincinnati =

- The Simpsons episode
- Episode no.: Season 32; Episode 8
- Directed by: Matthew Nastuk
- Written by: Jeff Westbrook
- Production code: ZABF20
- Original air date: November 29, 2020

Guest appearances
- Jason Bateman as himself; Hannibal Buress as Finch

Episode chronology
← Previous "Three Dreams Denied"	Next → "Sorry Not Sorry"
- The Simpsons season 32

"The Road to Cincinnati" is the eighth episode of the thirty-second season of the American animated television series The Simpsons, and the 692nd episode overall. It aired in the United States on Fox on November 29, 2020. The episode was directed by Matthew Nastuk, and written by Jeff Westbrook.

Hannibal Buress guest-stars as Principal Finch and Jason Bateman appeared as himself.

The episode featured Superintendent Chalmers and Principal Skinner going to Cincinnati. It received mixed reviews and was watched live in the United States by 1.63 million viewers.

== Plot ==
When Superintendent Chalmers is selected to give the keynote speech at an administrators' convention in Cincinnati, he elects to take popular Principal Finch as his plus one. During detention, Bart notes the school's lack of respect for Principal Skinner and urges him to step up his game to win the spot. When Finch falls ill from food poisoning, Skinner volunteers in his place, and Chalmers reluctantly agrees.

Things get off to a rocky start when Skinner checks the bag with Chalmers's anxiety medicine at the airport, causing him to have a panic attack and get thrown off the flight. Skinner volunteers to drive the 800 miles to the convention. The pair face a number of obstacles, including a hitchhiking Shakespearean improv, a traffic court and an angry gang of cyclists; but eventually begin to bond. One night at a bed and breakfast, Skinner overhears a phone conversation between Chalmers and Finch, revealing that Chalmers was planning on replacing Skinner with Finch as principal. Furious, Skinner confronts his boss, admitting he had deliberately poisoned Finch to keep him off the trip. The two brawl, and Chalmers heads to Cincinnati alone.

At the keynote speech, Chalmers attempts to check his speech, but then sees that he has a stack of index cards marked "Road Trip Conversation Starters, Seymour Skinner", and realizes that they accidentally switched jackets, and subsequently, Skinner has his speech. Chalmers then starts to choke. However, he is able to bond with the other superintendents over tales of inept underlings, and ends up praising Skinner, who has just arrived to deliver the notes. The two reconcile and Chalmers delivers his speech. Upon returning to Springfield, Skinner earns the respect of the schoolchildren and meets with Chalmers for a friendly meal at a chili restaurant.

In the tag scene, Marge surprises the family with tickets to the improv group, much to their dismay.

== Production ==
=== Development ===
Executive producer Matt Selman wanted to explore the Skinner-Chalmers relationship with a road trip episode. Cincinnati was selected as the convention location because Selman thought it represented Middle America, where such a convention would take place. Selman wanted to include references to Cincinnati chili, and writer Jeff Westbrook added jokes about "three-way" and "four-way" styles of chili. As part of the research, the producers ordered a large box of Skyline Chili through the mail, which came in cans and bags. Some writers did not like the taste, but Selman enjoyed it. When the COVID-19 pandemic forced the show to be produced remotely, Selman took the chili home with him.

The animation design of Cincinnati was done in Los Angeles before being sent to South Korea for multi-frame animation and coloring. In the final animation, Selman noticed that Skinner and Chalmers were eating Cincinnati chili out of bowls instead of plates, but it was too expensive to reanimate.

The end credits are styled to match the credits from the television series WKRP in Cincinnati, of which Selman is a fan.

=== Casting ===
Because of the minimal appearance of the Simpson family, the regular actors played other roles. Dan Castellaneta voiced the sheriff, Julie Kavner voiced the emotional support turkey, and Yeardley Smith voiced one of the improv actors.

Hannibal Buress guest-stars in the episode as Principal Finch, and Jason Bateman appeared as himself.

=== Music ===
An instrumental version of the opening theme from WKRP in Cincinnati plays as Chalmers arrives in Cincinnati. A version with lyrics plays as Skinner and Chalmers eat chili. The closing theme for the series plays over the end credits.

=== Release ===
On 2020, Fox released eight promotional pictures from the episode. The episode was originally scheduled to air on November 8, 2020, however, due to being preempted by "The 7 Beer Itch," which was preempted by "Treehouse of Horror XXXI," which was preempted by game seven of the 2020 National League Championship Series, the episode was rescheduled to air on November 29, 2020.

=== Pop culture reference ===
The song that plays in an endless loop in Skinner's car is "Timothy," a 1970 song about starving miners who kill and eat a man after a cave in.

== Reception ==
=== Viewing figures ===
In the United States, the episode was watched live by 1.63 million viewers.

=== Critical response ===
Tony Sokol with Den of Geek said, "As god as my witness, I thought turkeys could fly, and believe one of the good things about choosing Cincinnati as the setting is the excuse to hear the two WKRP in Cincinnati theme songs. Sadly, that’s a highlight of a fairly lame trip. This is what remote learning does to The Simpsons. “The Road to Cincinnati” is paved with too many good intentions. The Springfield faculty gets to get out of town but ultimately there's nowhere to go but Cincinnati." He also gave the episode three out of five stars.

Jesse Bereta of Bubbleblabber gave the episode gave the episode score of 9/10 stating, "The most exciting thing to come out of this episode was that it allowed the supporting characters the full run-time to tell their story. We have become accustomed to two-plot episodes that feature characters like these having their adventure whilst something else is occurring in the Simpsons home. Not surprisingly, this was preferable."

John Kiesewetter of WVXU thought the animation of the Cincinnati waterfront was "breathtakingly detailed" and thought the episode was a "love letter" to the city.
