= Now Museum, Now You Don't (The Simpsons) =

- The Simpsons episode
- Episode no.: Season 32; Episode 3
- Directed by: Timothy Bailey
- Written by: Dan Greaney
- Production code: ZABF21
- Original air date: October 11, 2020

Episode features
- Couch gag: The family is drawn in on a series of animation cels that flip down onto the screen in a living room background. Homer eats a donut as the muscle and skin cels flip down.

Episode chronology
← Previous "I, Carumbus"	Next → "Treehouse of Horror XXXI"
- The Simpsons season 32

"Now Museum, Now You Don't" is the third episode of the thirty-second season of the American animated television series The Simpsons, and the 687th episode overall. It aired in the United States on Fox on October 11, 2020. The episode was directed by Timothy Bailey, and written by Dan Greaney.

It is the first episode in which Eric Lopez provided the voice of Bumblebee Man, taking over the role from Hank Azaria. The episode featured Lisa fantasizing about Western Art. It also received generally positive reviews, and was watched live in the United States by 1.36 million viewers.

== Plot ==
While being home sick, Lisa Simpson reads a book about western art and fantasizes the stories as follows.

=== Lisanardo da Vinci ===
Back in Vinci, Italy in 1462, Lisanardo da Vinci (Lisa) draws a suspect for Chief Wiggum, Wiggum thinks that this would make a lot of money for Homer. Florence at that time was at the start of the Renaissance. Soon, Lisanardo becomes the most famous artist in Florence, leading to jealousy from her fellow students.

Later on, Lisanardo becomes worried about being too talented and starts writing secret diaries that no one will decipher for 400 years.

One of the diaries is stolen by Barticelli (Bart Simpson) and is given to Mr. Burns. Mr. Burns uses the ideas for evil, ultimately destroying the city. When Lisanardo learns her ideas are being used for war, she escapes to France and goes to the Court of King Francis I (Nelson Muntz), where she works on her newest masterpiece, a novel titled The Da Vinci Code.

=== 1863 France ===
After initially being picked on by the other students in 1863, a French Impressionist (Bart), receives praise from Henri de Toulouse-Lautrec (Moe) for his work and he earns the respect of the other students. The school administration worries that the Emperor will not like the art, so they tell the students not to show it to him. However, the students do anyway, and the Emperor praises their work.

=== Cupid ===
Cupid (Maggie) accidentally shoots Homer with a death arrow instead of a love arrow and he dies, ascending into heaven on an escalator before it plunges into a Hieronymus Bosch hell.

=== Diego Rivera and Frida Kahlo ===
Shortly after Diego (Homer) and Frida (Marge) are married, Diego has them move to America, where John D. Rockefeller (Mr. Burns) has Diego paint a mural at Rockefeller Center, while Frida is left out. Frida's sisters (Patty and Selma) encourage her to leave Diego, but she is hesitant. In an attempt to be noticed for her work, Frida shows her works to Diego who praises them. Diego them decides to adapt his mural to reflect Frida's ideas, which Rockefeller doesn't like, so he tells Diego to paint over it or lose the job. Diego refuses and so they leave.

=== Vincent ===
Moe sings a song to the tune of "Vincent", as the credits roll over famous paintings.

== Production ==
A still from the episode was released on Twitter by showrunner Al Jean on July 16, 2020. Also on 2020, Fox released seven promotional pictures from the episode.

This is the first episode with Eric Lopez voicing Bumblebee Man, taking over from Hank Azaria who voiced the character since the fourth season. This came after the producers of the series announced that "Moving forward, The Simpsons will no longer have white actors voice non-white characters," and follows Alex Désert taking over the role of Carl Carlson from Azaria, in the first episode of the season.

== Reception ==
=== Viewing figures ===
In the United States, the episode was watched live by 1.36 million viewers.

=== Critical response ===
Tony Sokol with Den of Geek said, "While it may not be a masterpiece, The Simpsons season 32, episode 3, 'Now Museum, Now You Don’t' can hang in most galleries. Beyond the humor, the visuals are quite impressive, and varied." He went on to say that, "'Now Museum, Now You Don't' works as a variety show, even though it follows through on one concept. It’s not a side-splitting episode, but the segments allow it to be a varied one. All three segments were well produced, funny and had enough historical trivia to keep it clever." He also gave the episode four out of five stars.

Jesse Bereta of Bubbleblabber gave the episode a 7 out of 10. He wished the episode was not the second of three consecutive non-traditional episodes and would have preferred a traditional story in this spot. He called the episode "intellectual and informative." He highlighted the ending scene of Moe singing.
