= The Simpsons season 32 =

Season of television series

The Simpsons
- Season 32
- Digital purchase image featuring Bleeding Gums Murphy
- Showrunners: Al Jean; Matt Selman
- No. of episodes: 22

Release
- Original network: Fox
- Original release: September 27, 2020 – May 23, 2021

Season chronology
- ← Previous; Season 31 Next → Season 33

The thirty-second season of the American animated sitcom The Simpsons aired on Fox between September 27, 2020, and May 23, 2021. On February 6, 2019, the season was ordered along with the previous season. It was produced by Gracie Films and 20th Television. This season contained twenty-two episodes. It includes the series' 700th episode "Manger Things". In March 2021, the series was renewed for a thirty-third and thirty-fourth season.

Animator Nik Ranieri won an Emmy Award for his work in "Wad Goals", and the episode "The Dad-Feelings Limited" was nominated for the Primetime Emmy Award for Outstanding Animated Program. Three writers were nominated for Writers Guild of America Awards.

== Episodes ==
No. overall	No. in season	Title	Directed by	Written by	Original release date	Prod. code	U.S. viewers (millions)
685	1	"Undercover Burns"	Bob Anderson	David Cryan	September 27, 2020	ZABF19	4.44
Mr. Burns discovers that his employees do not like him very much, because of his pompous ways. Smithers decides to help a distraught Mr. Burns go undercover as a man named Fred Kranepool. Initially determined to punish disloyal employees, the plant employees grow to like "Fred", causing Mr. Burns to want to adopt that personality permanently. Smithers is forced to expose his boss, causing Mr. Burns to revert to his former tyrannical personality. Guest stars: David Harbour as Mr. Burns' undercover persona Fred Kranepool and Philip Rosenthal as himself
686	2	"I, Carumbus"	Rob Oliver	Cesar Mazariegos	October 4, 2020	ZABF18	1.51
While the Simpson family visit a museum exhibit on Ancient Rome, Marge chastises a bored Homer for his lack of ambition when he admits to shirking chances for promotion. The curator overhears the squabble and begins to relay the tale of Obeseus the Wide. Obeseus is sold to slavery until he impregnates his master's daughter and is freed and takes part in his master's business. His wife pushes him to join the Senate. His wife, wanting more power, tells Obeseus to kill the emperor so his son can be crowned. However, his son sentences Obeseus to death. He challenges his son to the death, and they both die, causing his wife to kill herself. The Simpson family then argues over the moral of the story. Guest stars: Joe Mantegna as Gordus Antonius (Fat Tony) and Michael Palin as the Curator
687	3	"Now Museum, Now You Don't"	Timothy Bailey	Dan Greaney	October 11, 2020	ZABF21	1.36
While sick, Lisa reads a book about Western art, and imagines her family as famous painters.: "Lisanardo da Vinci": Lisa imagines herself as Leonardo da Vinci, the painter and inventor. When she learns that her ideas are being used for war, she escapes to France.; "1863 France": After initially being picked on by the other students, a French impressionist (Bart) receives praise for his work and he earns the respect of the other students. His school is worried the emperor will not like his art, but he praises the work.; "Cupid": Cupid (Maggie) shoots Homer with an arrow and he dies, descending into a Hieronymus Bosch hell.; "Frida Kahlo": Shortly after Diego Rivera (Homer) and Frida (Marge) are married, Diego has them move to America, where John D. Rockefeller has Diego paint a mural at the Rockefeller Center, while Frida is left out, causing friction in their marriage. Frida shows Diego some of her work, and he uses her ideas for his mural. When Rockefeller does not like the work, they leave.
688	4	"Treehouse of Horror XXXI"	Steven Dean Moore	Julia Prescott	November 1, 2020 (Note: This episode was originally scheduled to air on October 18, 2020, but was preempted as a result of the 2020 National League Championship Series running overtime. However, the episode was screened on October 14, 2020, at "Paley Front Row: Simpsons Treehouse of Horror," a panel discussion hosted by Decider, Paley Center for Media, and Fox. The episode still aired on its originally scheduled air date in Canada on Citytv.)	ZABF17	4.93
In the thirty-first Treehouse of Horror episode: "2020 Election": During Election Day 2020, everyone is voting who will be the next president of the United States, except for Homer who does not vote. Two months later, on Inauguration Day 2021, the entire city of Springfield is in chaos, while Homer relaxes.; "Toy Gory": Bart tortures his toys. As revenge, Bart is killed by his surviving toys, and they turn his body into a toy. Then, they play with his corpse.; "Into the Homerverse": Homer mistakes a machine at the nuclear plant for a vending machine. When he inserts a coin into it, it explodes, and multiple different versions of himself from different dimensions come through a portal. Lisa says the explosion caused a hole in the space-time continuum, and Homer needs to recreate it to fix it. Mr. Burns tries to stop him with other versions of Burns and Smithers until he sees a version where Burns is Smithers' assistant. Homer then sends them all home.; "Be Nine, Rewind": Lisa gets stuck in a time loop on her ninth birthday in which she dies each time. With Nelson's help, they stop the loop by killing Gil.; Guest star: Ben Mankiewicz as himself
689	5	"The 7 Beer Itch"	Mike Frank Polcino	Story by : Al Jean; Teleplay by : Joel H. Cohen & John Frink	November 8, 2020	ZABF15	1.74
A beautiful English woman named Lily comes to Springfield. She becomes enamored with Homer, who is lonely while the rest of the family is on vacation. Mr. Burns becomes attracted to Lily and has Homer arrange to have Lily meet him for a date. When it goes poorly, Homer drives Lily home, and she kisses him. Marge and the family return home early because they had a terrible time. Knowing Marge is the only woman for him, Homer rejects Lily, and she returns to England. Once there, she falls for a man who looks like Homer. Guest stars: Olivia Colman as Lily, Robin Atkin Downes and Brian George as Various Englishmen
690	6	"Podcast News"	Matthew Faughnan	David X. Cohen	November 15, 2020	ZABF22	3.50
Marge and Lisa become addicted to true-crime podcasts. Meanwhile, Grampa get a new girlfriend named Vivienne. When they go on a cruise and Vivienne reportedly dies, Grampa is a suspect. Kent Brockman makes a podcast of about the incident. Vivienne left her money to Grampa in a life insurance policy. Feeling guilty, Grampa admits to murder and is jailed. However, Vivienne is tracked to a Mexican resort. The Simpsons force Brockman to reveal the truth on the finale of his podcast, and Grampa is freed. Later, Grampa encounters Vivienne, who says that he was supposed to collect the insurance money and meet her in Mexico. Guest stars: Morgan Fairchild as Vivienne St. Charmaine, Christine Nangle as Tabitha Shingle and Stellan Skarsgård as himself Note: This episode was dedicated in memory of Alex Trebek who previously guest starred as himself in the episodes "Miracle on Evergreen Terrace" and "Penny-Wiseguys." Regular cast member Yeardley Smith also appears in a cameo as herself (the host of the podcast Small Town Dicks).
691	7	"Three Dreams Denied"	Steven Dean Moore	Danielle Weisberg	November 22, 2020	QABF02	4.41
Comic Book Guy attends the Comicalooza convention, planning to present the ultimate audience question with hopes he will be hired by Marvel Comics. However, when it is his turn, he forgets his question, and he returns home saddened. Meanwhile, Lisa develops a crush on a new kid named Blake who also plays the saxophone. However, he tricks her into losing her school chair, so she goes to play her saxophone at the mall where people like it. Bart is hired as a voice-over actor for a new cartoon show, only to become embarrassed by the role where he has been cast as a princess. However, when people see that the princess is a killer, they are impressed. Guest stars: Ben Platt as Blake and Paul Rudd as himself
692	8	"The Road to Cincinnati"	Matthew Nastuk	Jeff Westbrook	November 29, 2020	ZABF20	1.63
When Superintendent Chalmers is selected to give the keynote speech at an administrator's convention in Cincinnati, Principal Skinner takes some advice from Bart and replaces favored Principal Finch as his superior's plus-one. At the airport, when Skinner checks Chalmers' bag with his anxiety medicine, he has a panic attack, and they are forced to drive to Cincinnati. At a motel along the way, Skinner overhears that Chalmers plans to replace Skinner at school with Finch. Angry, Skinner admits to poisoning Finch, so he could accompany Chalmers. They fight, and Chalmers continues to Cincinnati alone. As he gives the speech, he realizes he left his notes with Skinner. He talks about the ineptitude of his underlings, but he ends up praising Skinner, who arrives with the notes. They reconcile and return to Springfield. Guest stars: Jason Bateman as himself and Hannibal Buress as Principal Finch
693	9	"Sorry Not Sorry"	Rob Oliver	Nell Scovell	December 6, 2020	QABF01	1.66
When Lisa's "Who Inspires You?" project results in the same B− grade as every other student in her class, she becomes angered with Miss Hoover and calls her a hack. When Lisa refuses to apologize, she is sent to detention. When her stubbornness only makes matters worse, she is encouraged to try and understand things from her teacher's point of view. She follows Hoover home and sees her difficult and lonely life. Lisa buys Hoover a new massage chair and accepts Lisa's apology. Hoover decides to give Lisa a B+ but learns that she also gave Ralph the same grade. Guest stars: Christine Nangle as Ms. Timberwood, Ariana Piknjac and Ella Piknjac performing the end titles theme
694	10	"A Springfield Summer Christmas for Christmas"	Timothy Bailey	Jessica Conrad	December 13, 2020	QABF03	3.92
Aspiring Heartmark Channel film producer Mary Tannenbaum is sent to Springfield to help sort out problems with a Christmas movie being filmed there during the summer. Mary stays with the Simpsons where Heartmark fan Marge tries to befriend her, Homer tries to profit from the film, Lisa follows Mary with her own camera to film a behind-the-scenes documentary and Bart becomes bitter when he must give up his room for the film crew. Meanwhile, Mary forms an odd rapport with Principal Skinner after the two make a deal so that her film does not interfere with his Lettuce and Tomato Festival. She falls in love with Skinner even though she has a fiancé who is a surgeon. When she is forced to use the festival for the movie's finale, she and Skinner argue and end up trapped in a pile of fake snow. Skinner digs them out, but Bart shows Lisa's documentary showing Mary insulting the town. The citizens are angered, but Skinner convinces them to help finish the movie. Mary wants to stay with Skinner, but he rejects her because she already has a fiancé. Guest stars: Ellie Kemper as Mary Tannenbaum, Richard Kind as the director and Chris Parnell as Mary Tannenbaum's fiancé
695	11	"The Dad-Feelings Limited"	Chris Clements	Ryan Koh	January 3, 2021	QABF04	1.89
Homer and Marge team up with Comic Book Guy and his wife Kumiko to win a trivia contest. After spending time with Maggie, Kumiko decides she wants to have a baby, only for her husband to disagree. She gets Comic Book Guy to watch a movie with Bart and Lisa, and he enjoys it until he is unable to comfort them when they get upset. He goes to his family home, where his relatives live with their collections. His father admits that he stayed distant because he would not know what to say if he needed to comfort his son. They play a game of catch, and Comic Book Guy returns home and tells Kumiko he is ready for a family. Guest stars: Dan Aykroyd as Postage Stamp Fellow and Bob Balaban as the narrator
696	12	"Diary Queen"	Matthew Nastuk	Jeff Westbrook	February 21, 2021 (Note: This episode was originally scheduled to air on February 14, 2021, in the United States but was preempted due to rain delays during the 2021 Daytona 500, which prompted new episodes meant to air that night to be shown next Sunday night.)	QABF05	1.43
Bart and Milhouse discover Edna Krabappel's old diary after buying a bunch of books at Ned Flanders's yard sale to attempt a stunt. Discovering a page where Krabappel had written about her success of fixing Bart's school life after classes, Bart is suddenly convinced that he is the most improved student. With the help of Maggie, Lisa finds the diary at the treehouse and discovers that Mrs. Krabappel was actually referring to her cat, but only reveals this to Bart after he decides to enter the school's spelling bee. Later in the treehouse, Ned tells Bart that Mrs. Krabappel surely still thought fondly of him, and a thankful Bart returns the diary to him. Guest stars: Marcia Wallace as Edna Krabappel (archive recordings) and Joe Mantegna as Fat Tony
697	13	"Wad Goals"	Mike Frank Polcino	Brian Kelley	February 28, 2021	QABF06	1.24
After being told of a golf course in Springfield where golfers pay their caddies very handsomely, Bart signs up for the job. Marge wants Bart to quit after worrying about his personality and future. She posts online that the golf course does not pay taxes, and people threaten to shut it down. Bart and a golfer conspire to make golf a religion to avoid taxes. Marge and other religious leaders cannot stop them. However, when he hears the golfer insult him, Bart and his friends vandalize the golf course, and he quits. Guest stars: Stephen Root as Bildorf and James Sie as The Lama Note: This episode was dedicated in memory of Marc Wilmore, a writer and producer of The Simpsons who died on January 30, 2021.
698	14	"Yokel Hero"	Rob Oliver	Jeff Martin & Samantha Martin	March 7, 2021	QABF07	1.38
When Homer spends a night sharing the drunk tank with Cletus, the yokel's singing about family makes Homer remorseful and he vows to become a better husband and father. Homer offers to manage Cletus to help him become a country singing sensation. However, when he becomes successful, Cletus replaces Homer with a new slick manager when he decides to go professional. Without Cletus, Homer returns to his old ways. Marge tells Homer to bring Cletus home, but is unsuccessful. However, when Brandine and his children visit, he quits and goes home. Guest star: Albert Brooks as Slick manager
699	15	"Do Pizza Bots Dream of Electric Guitars"	Jennifer Moeller	Michael Price	March 14, 2021	QABF08	1.43
A pizza palace visit awakens bad memories of Homer's youth working there, when the mechanical band he loved was taken from him. Marge, Bart, Lisa, and Moe all track down the lost animatronics to reunite them for Homer once again. Bart and Lisa track the last robot to film and television producer J. J. Abrams, who is also collecting the band for his next film project. He buys the rights to the robots and takes them. After making a movie involving the robots, he announces a screening in Springfield. Homer tries to sabotage it, but Grampa stops him by saying it was he who ruined his childhood and not the ones who took the robots. Guest stars: J. J. Abrams as himself and Greg Grunberg as Bad Robot Head of Security Note: This episode is dedicated in memory of David Richardson, a writer and producer of The Simpsons who died on January 18, 2021.
700	16	"Manger Things"	Steven Dean Moore	Rob LaZebnik	March 21, 2021	QABF09	1.28
During Christmas, Bart finds an ornament featuring Todd Flanders on it, prompting Homer and Marge to tell the kids the story. Six years earlier, Homer promises not to drink at the power plant Christmas party but accidentally gets drunk, so Marge refuses to let him into the house. Ned lets Homer stay with the Flanders. Angered by his behavior, a pregnant Maude tells him to leave. Moe tells Homer about a room above the Simpsons' garage where Homer can secretly be close to his family and listen to them. Missing Homer, Bart and Lisa offer to give up their toys, but Marge says he must do a selfless deed. Homer tries to bake cookies but fails. When Maude goes into labor while Ned is out, Homer helps deliver the baby. Marge sees this and forgives Homer. Ned and Maude name the baby Todd Homer Flanders.: This is the show's 700th episode.
701	17	"Uncut Femmes"	Chris Clements	Christine Nangle	March 28, 2021	QABF10	1.22
Marge is forced to chaperone an overnight school trip on a ship with Sarah Wiggum when Homer and Chief Wiggum go to a Bob Seger concert. After putting the children to bed, Marge learns that Sarah has a boisterous personality and bond. However, they are kidnapped, and Marge learns that Sarah used to be part of a team of burglars until they were betrayed by Lindsay Naegle. They plan to steal a diamond from Naegle at a gala and force Marge and Sarah to help. When Seger shames Homer and Wiggum for abandoning their wives, they go to the ship and learn they were kidnapped. They see Marge and Sarah attending the gala on television. The burglars rob Naegle, but she chases after Marge and Sarah as Homer and Wiggum arrive to apologize. Sarah restrains Wiggum while Marge trips Naegle. The burglars frame Naegle for stealing jewelry at the gala, and she is arrested. Marge and Sarah then leave with the diamond. Guest stars: Joe Mantegna as Fat Tony, Megan Mullally as Sarah Wiggum, Nick Offerman as Captain Bowditch, Natasha Rothwell as Bette, Bob Seger as himself and Tiya Sircar as Erin
702	18	"Burger Kings"	Lance Kramer	Rob LaZebnik	April 11, 2021	QABF11	1.24
Mr. Burns almost kills himself eating Krusty Burgers and learns that the town would prefer he had died. To help his boss with both his image and newfound love of burgers, Smithers suggests Burns get into the plant-based burger business. Homer is hired as a spokesman while Marge accidentally buys stock in Burns' new company. Lisa learns that the burgers are made from endangered rainforest plants. Lisa tells Homer, and they expose Burns to the public. Knowing what Lisa and Homer were going to do, Marge sold her stock in advance to keep the profit. The people return to hating Burns, but he is relieved because he no longer needs to try to be good.
703	19	"Panic on the Streets of Springfield"	Matthew Nastuk	Tim Long	April 18, 2021	QABF12	1.31
Homer buys a truck that comes with a music streaming service subscription. Lisa uses the service and becomes a fan of a 1980s band fronted by Quilloughby. After being humiliated in front of the whole school when she accidentally eats bacon, Lisa begins hallucinating Quilloughby as an imaginary friend. He encourages her to give witty retorts to everyone. When Marge learns the source of Lisa's new attitude, she cancels the music service. Lisa steals Homer's credit card to attend a music festival where the real Quilloughby is performing. She sees that the real Quilloughby is now a hateful carnivore, and the imaginary Quilloughby tells her not to become like him. Marge finds Lisa and says that Lisa's behavior reminds her of her own rebellion against her mother. She tells Lisa that she will always be there for her. Guest star: Benedict Cumberbatch as Quilloughby Note: This episode was dedicated in memory of Edwin E. Aguilar, an animator, character layout and assistant director of The Simpsons who died on April 11, 2021.
704	20	"Mother and Child Reunion"	Jennifer Moeller	J. Stewart Burns	May 9, 2021	QABF14	1.11
At a magic store, the family is given tarot card readings that tell of a future disagreement between Lisa and Marge. A teenage Lisa decides not to attend college, which conflicts with Marge’s expectations for her. She decides to work as a teacher and soon creates her own academy with schools all over the country. She wins an election for school superintendent and eventually becomes President of the United States. In the meantime, Lisa becomes estranged from Marge, and Bart becomes the owner of a cannabis company. He reminds Lisa of the times when Marge was there to support her. When Marge visits the White House, they reconcile. Guest stars: Werner Herzog as The Amazing Herzog, Nate Silver as himself and George Stephanopoulos as himself Note: This episode was dedicated in memory of Olympia Dukakis who previously guest starred as Zelda in the episode "The Old Man and the Key".
705	21	"The Man from G.R.A.M.P.A."	Mike Frank Polcino	Carolyn Omine	May 16, 2021	QABF13	1.06
Homer meets a British secret agent named Terrance who has spent fifty years hunting a suspected Russian spy known as "The Grey Fox". After Homer and his friends hear Terrance's story, Homer begins to suspect that Grampa is the Grey Fox. They observe Grampa receiving a package from Russian men, and Terrance tells Homer to bring Grampa to him. He refuses, so Terrance kidnaps Homer and Grampa and plans to kill them in the desert. The Simpson family learn what happened, and they go with Chief Wiggum to the desert. Terrance is arrested. Feeling sorry for Terrance, Grampa pretends to be the Grey Fox so that Terrance can feel accomplishment. Guest stars: Stephen Fry as Terrance, Head of MI5, Terrance's Father and Hazel, Robin Atkin Downes and Brian George as MI5 Agents, Maurice LaMarche as Orson Welles and Dima Malanitchev as Russian See 'n Say
706	22	"The Last Barfighter"	Timothy Bailey	Dan Vebber	May 23, 2021	QABF15	1.02
When Bart wins a bottle of tequila, Homer takes it to Moe's. Homer and his friends get Moe drunk, and he reveals all their secrets, which angers them. Because Moe broke the one rule of a secret society of bartenders, they plan to inject Homer and his friends with "Anti-Booze", a serum that stops them from drinking alcohol. Moe tries to save them but fails. Three months later, Homer and his friends have become productive and successful while Moe works at an omelet bar. They forgive him, and he serves them water at Moe's. For being loyal to Moe, the society gives the antidote to the Anti-Booze to Homer's friends. Homer refuses but is forced to take it. Guest stars: Ian McShane as Artemis and Cesar Mazariegos as Grampa Baby

== Voice cast & characters ==
=== Main cast ===
- Dan Castellaneta as Homer Simpson, Barney Gumble, Grampa Simpson, Mayor Quimby, Sideshow Mel, Groundskeeper Willie, Squeaky-Voiced Teen, Gil Gunderson, Krusty the Clown, Hans Moleman, Incest Spuckler, Frankie the Squealer, Louie, Rich Texan, Sam, Itchy, Yes Guy, Grizzly Shawn, Scott Christian, Blue-Haired Lawyer and various others
- Julie Kavner as Marge Simpson, Selma Bouvier, Patty Bouvier and various others
- Nancy Cartwright as Bart Simpson, Maggie Simpson, Nelson Muntz, Ralph Wiggum, Kearney Zzyzwicz, Todd Flanders and various others
- Yeardley Smith as Lisa Simpson and herself ("Podcast News")
- Hank Azaria as Moe Szyslak, Carl Carlson^{[A]}, Raphael, Comic Book Guy, Luigi Risotto, Cletus Spuckler, Chief Wiggum, Superintendent Chalmers, Old Jewish Man, Snake, Captain McCallister, Johnny Tightlips, Kirk Van Houten, Duffman, Disco Stu, Professor Frink and various others
- Harry Shearer as Lenny Leonard, Mr. Burns, Waylon Smithers, Kent Brockman, Rainier Wolfcastle, Reverend Lovejoy, Jasper Beardsley, Principal Skinner, Dewey Largo, Dr. Hibbert^{[B]}, Ned Flanders, Judge Snyder, Officer Eddie, Herman Hermann, Scratchy and various others

=== Supporting cast ===
- Pamela Hayden as Milhouse Van Houten, Jimbo Jones, Janey Powell, Rod Flanders and various others
- Tress MacNeille as Shauna Chalmers, Lindsey Naegle, Dolph Shapiro, Agnes Skinner, Crazy Cat Lady, Mrs. Glick, Lunchlady Dora, Brandine Spuckler, Mrs. Gumble and various others
- Kimberly Brooks as Lewis Clark and various others
- Grey DeLisle as Martin Prince, Sherri and Terri and various others
- Alex Désert as Carl Carlson, Officer Lou and various others
- Chris Edgerly as Mark Zuckerberg and additional characters
- Dawnn Lewis as Bernice Hibbert and Stewardess ("Three Dreams Denied")
- Eric Lopez as Bumblebee Man and various others
- Kevin Michael Richardson as Bleeding Gums Murphy, Dr. Hibbert^{[C]} and various others
- Tony Rodríguez as Julio ("Uncut Femmes") and various others
- Melanie Minichino as Omelet Woman ("The Last Barfighter")
- Maggie Roswell as Helen Lovejoy, Miss Hoover, Maude Flanders, Luann Van Houten and various others
- Jenny Yokobori as Kumiko Albertson and Abrams Lackey #2 ("Do Pizza Bots Dream of Electric Guitars?")

Notes

- A. Only in episode "I Carambus" as alternate version character Carlum.
- B. In episodes "Treehouse of Horror XXXI," "Podcast News" and "Diary Queen"
- C. In episodes "Wad Goals," "Panic on the Streets of Springfield" and "The Last Barfighter"

David Harbour, Olivia Colman, Ben Platt, Hannibal Buress, and Michael Palin guest starred during the season. Series regular Yeardley Smith also played herself.

== Production ==
=== Development ===
This season and the previous season were ordered in February 2019. Seven episodes were holdovers from the previous season. The season was produced by Gracie Films and was the only season co-produced by 20th Television, which was renamed from 20th Century Fox Television. Executive producer Al Jean continued his role as primary showrunner, a role he had since the thirteenth season. Executive producer Matt Selman was also the showrunner for several episodes, a role he performed since the twenty-third season. Commenting on the series reaching 700 episodes this season, Jean stated that the show needed to change with the times so that present-day issues could be addressed.

This season featured the first episodes of the series written by Cesar Mazariegos and Jessica Conrad. It also featured the first episode written by David X. Cohen since 1998 and the first episode written by Nell Scovell since the second season. Furthermore, it featured the only episodes written by David Cryan, Julia Prescott, and Danielle Weisberg, and the only episode co-written by Samantha Martin.

The season was produced during the COVID-19 pandemic, which impacted many other television productions, but left animated production largely unaffected. Executive producer James L. Brooks encouraged the staff to begin working from their homes in early March 2020, before California's stay-at-home order was declared. In an interview with The Hollywood Reporter in late March 2020, showrunner Al Jean stated, "Production hasn't skipped a day or lost a beat." At that point seven episodes for the season, including the Treehouse of Horror episode, were already completed, and they had started reading the remainder of the twenty-two total. Jean also stated that "we're a little ahead of where we usually are." Production was conducted using video conferencing, and studios were installed in the actors’ homes for voice recording. Producers decided not to address the pandemic other than during a segment of the Treehouse of Horror episode and a line spoken in the 700th episode.

The series had a panel at the 2020 San Diego Comic-Con, which was marketed as "Comic-Con@Home", to promote the season, with Jean, Matt Selman, David Silverman, Carolyn Omine, and Mike B. Anderson on the panel, with cast member Yeardley Smith serving as moderator.

=== Casting ===
In the wake of protests following the murder of George Floyd, the series announced on June 26, 2020, that "Moving forward, The Simpsons will no longer have white actors voice non-white characters." This followed Mike Henry stating that he would no longer voice the African-American character Cleveland Brown on fellow Fox animated series Family Guy, and Jenny Slate and Kristen Bell's announcement that they would no longer voice mixed-race characters on Big Mouth and Central Park, respectively, in response to the race riots. It also followed series regular Hank Azaria's January 2020 announcement that he would no longer voice the Indian character Apu Nahasapeemapetilon on The Simpsons. Series regular Harry Shearer was not fully in agreement with the decision, stating that "the job of the actor is to play someone who they're not".

On September 24, 2020, it was announced that Alex Désert would voice Carl Carlson in the first episode of the season, taking over from Azaria who voiced the character since the first season. On October 11, 2020, Jean announced that Eric Lopez would begin voicing Bumblebee Man in the episode "Now Museum, Now You Don't" instead of Azaria, who had provided the voice of the character since his introduction in season four. On December 10, 2020, the official logline on FOXFLASH for the episode "The Dad-Feelings Limited" revealed that Kumiko would be voiced by Jenny Yokobori instead of Tress MacNeille, who had voiced the character since her introduction in the season twenty-five episode "Married to the Blob." In the episode "Uncut Femmes", the character of Julio was recast to Tony Rodriguez. On February 22, 2021, it was announced that beginning with "Wad Goals", voice actor Kevin Michael Richardson, who joined the show since Season 21 as different minor characters, would replace Harry Shearer as Dr. Hibbert.

== Release ==
The season aired on Sundays during the 2020–21 television season as part of Fox's Animation Domination programming block, along with Bless the Harts, Bob's Burgers, The Great North and Family Guy. One day after an episode aired on Fox, it was also made available on Hulu. It was made available for streaming in the US on Disney+ on September 29, 2021. and in the UK on November 3, 2021.

== Reception ==
=== Ratings ===
For the 2020-2021 television season, the season earned a 0.8 rating in the 18-49 demographic, which was the 59th best performing show. It averaged 2.36 million viewers, which was the 117th best performing show.

Viewership and ratings per episode of The Simpsons season 32
No.	Title	Air date	Rating (18–49)	Viewers (millions)	DVR (18–49)	DVR viewers (millions)	Total (18–49)	Total viewers (millions)
1	"Undercover Burns"	September 27, 2020	1.7	4.44	0.2	0.35	1.9	4.80
2	"I, Carumbus"	October 4, 2020	0.5	1.51	0.1	0.29	0.6	1.80
3	"Now Museum, Now You Don't"	October 11, 2020	0.5	1.36	—N/a	—N/a	—N/a	—N/a
4	"Treehouse of Horror XXXI"	November 1, 2020	1.7	4.93	0.3	0.54	2.0	5.48
5	"The 7 Beer Itch"	November 8, 2020	0.7	1.74	0.1	0.31	0.8	2.05
6	"Podcast News"	November 15, 2020	1.3	3.50	0.1	0.35	1.4	3.86
7	"Three Dreams Denied"	November 22, 2020	1.5	4.41	TBD	TBD	TBD	TBD
8	"The Road to Cincinnati"	November 29, 2020	0.6	1.63	TBD	TBD	TBD	TBD
9	"Sorry Not Sorry"	December 6, 2020	0.6	1.66	TBD	TBD	TBD	TBD
10	"A Springfield Summer Christmas for Christmas"	December 13, 2020	1.3	3.92	TBD	TBD	TBD	TBD
11	"The Dad-Feelings Limited"	January 3, 2021	0.6	1.89	TBD	TBD	TBD	TBD
12	"Diary Queen"	February 21, 2021	0.5	1.43	TBD	TBD	TBD	TBD
13	"Wad Goals"	February 28, 2021	0.4	1.24	TBD	TBD	TBD	TBD
14	"Yokel Hero"	March 7, 2021	0.5	1.38	TBD	TBD	TBD	TBD
15	"Do Pizza Bots Dream of Electric Guitars"	March 14, 2021	0.5	1.43	TBD	TBD	TBD	TBD
16	"Manger Things"	March 21, 2021	0.4	1.28	TBD	TBD	TBD	TBD
17	"Uncut Femmes"	March 28, 2021	0.4	1.22	TBD	TBD	TBD	TBD
18	"Burger Kings"	April 11, 2021	0.4	1.24	TBD	TBD	TBD	TBD
19	"Panic on the Streets of Springfield"	April 18, 2021	0.4	1.31	TBD	TBD	TBD	TBD
20	"Mother and Child Reunion"	May 9, 2021	0.3	1.11	0.1	0.26	0.4	1.38
21	"The Man from G.R.A.M.P.A"	May 16, 2021	0.4	1.06	0.1	0.2	0.5	1.25
22	"The Last Barfighter"	May 23, 2021	0.4	1.02	0.1	0.19	0.4	1.21

=== Critical response ===
Jesse Bereta of Bubbleblabber gave the season an 8.5 out of 10. He thought the first half of the season featured more creative episodes while the later half featured some repeated plots. He felt the overall quality of the episodes were improving under the management of Disney.

=== Awards and nominations ===
At the 73rd Primetime Creative Arts Emmy Awards, animator Nik Ranieri won for Outstanding Individual Achievement in Animation as Lead Character Layout for the episode "Wad Goals". The episode "The Dad-Feelings Limited" was nominated for Outstanding Animated Program.

At the 73rd Writers Guild of America Awards, writers Cesar Mazariegos, Danielle Weisberg, and Jessica Conrad were individually nominated for the Writers Guild of America Award for Television: Animation.
