= Wad Goals =

- The Simpsons episode
- Episode no.: Season 32; Episode 13
- Directed by: Mike Frank Polcino
- Written by: Brian Kelley
- Production code: QABF06
- Original air date: February 28, 2021

Guest appearance
- Stephen Root as Bildorf

Episode chronology
← Previous "Diary Queen"	Next → "Yokel Hero"
- The Simpsons season 32

"Wad Goals" is the thirteenth episode of the thirty-second season of the American animated television series The Simpsons and the 697th episode overall. It aired in the United States on Fox on February 28, 2021. The episode was directed by Mike Frank Polcino and written by Brian Kelley.

In this episode, Bart becomes a successful caddy, but Marge worries that it is ruining his character. Stephen Root guest-stars as Bildorf. The episode received positive reviews. Animator Nik Ranieri won the Primetime Emmy Award for Outstanding Individual Achievement in Animation as Lead Character Layout for the episode.

The episode is dedicated in memory of Marc Wilmore, a writer and producer of The Simpsons who died on January 30, 2021.

== Plot ==
On the last day of school, Ralph is walking in the streets thinking that he is in a parade, and discovers a golf course in the middle of Springfield, where rich people like Mr. Burns and celebrities play golf and hang around. He tells Bart, Milhouse, and Nelson about it and the group of friends discover that the golfers pay their caddies a lot of money (or as they refer to it, "wad"). Bart and Milhouse get jobs there as caddies too, and Bart starts sucking up towards the club members after being successfully paid by Kent Brockman.

At home, the family congratulates Bart at his new job, unaware of how much he is getting paid. After going to pick Bart up from the golf course, Marge and Maggie take a sneak peek behind a tree and discover Bart sucking up to the Rich Texan as he pays him. While Bart buys ice cream for the whole family, Marge attempts to have Homer talk Bart into quitting his job, but Homer refuses, saying it is an American way of life, and that Bart is just getting used to. After talking about her concerns with Lisa, Marge attempts to post an online article about how the golf course does not pay taxes but accidentally calls upon social groups whose claims against tax fraud threaten to shut the golf course down.

Bart gets assigned to another golfer named Bildorf, who tells him to convince Marge to change her mind. The two then come up with the idea to make golf a religion to allow the course to avoid paying a bunch of taxes, which Mayor Quimby allows. After Reverend Lovejoy and other religious leaders prove to be no help, Marge is ready to give up. But after Bildorf insults Bart by firing him as his caddy and hiring an untalented rich kid, then saying that Bart will never be allowed to join the club and will always be inferior to someone like Bildorf, Bart gets mad and joins up with his friends to vandalize the course. Marge is happy to have the old Bart back.

Despite Bart's actions being considered a crime, Chief Wiggum and other police officers arrest Bildorf for allowing the golf house to start a sex cult inside the religion.

== Production ==
=== Casting ===
Stephen Root guest-stars as Bildorf in the episode. This episode marks the first time that recurring co-star Kevin Michael Richardson replaces Harry Shearer as the voice of Dr. Hibbert. Richardson initially declined the offer to play Hibbert but accepted when asked again. He wanted to voice the character in a similar tone as Shearer's. Voice actor James Sie has a small role as the Lama in Lovejoy's circle of religious associates. Voice actress Kimberly Brooks voices Bart's longtime friend Lewis Clark.

According to executive producer Matt Selman the staff had wanted to get Larry David of Seinfeld and Curb Your Enthusiasm fame to voice the role of the golf-loving Rabbi, but when the COVID-19 pandemic hit, they decided not to bother him.

=== Development ===
On 2021, Fox released 12 promotional pictures from the episode.

=== Release ===
The episode was originally scheduled to debut on February 21, 2021, but was rescheduled to February 28.

== Reception ==
=== Viewing figures ===
In the United States, the episode was watched live by 1.24 million viewers.

=== Critical response ===
Tony Sokol with Den of Geek, said "'Wad Goals' aims at too many targets and spends some time in the rough. The arc is timed out perfectly and Bart's corruption and redemption resonates. There are plenty of quick and subliminal visual gags, and the pacing altogether is quick. But it doesn't land as many solid laughs. The sex cult payoff is a little too pat, in spite of how unexpected it is. It's almost like a short cut. Maybe the problem is golf. It's not as exciting as even tennis. The Simpsons does a good job showing how it as one of the ultimate uneven playing fields, the commentary is pointed but the satire is just under par." He also gave the episode 3.5 out of 5 stars.

John Schwarz of Bubbleblabber gave the episode an 8 out of 10. He highlighted the jokes and the performance of Stephen Root. He also thought it was ironic that an episode about protestors trying to shut down a golf course features the replacement of Dr. Hibbert's voice, which was precipitated by the George Floyd protests.

=== Awards ===
Animator Nik Ranieri won the Primetime Emmy Award for Outstanding Individual Achievement in Animation at the 73rd Primetime Creative Arts Emmy Awards as Lead Character Layout for the episode.
