= The Dad-Feelings Limited =

- The Simpsons episode
- Episode no.: Season 32; Episode 11
- Directed by: Chris Clements
- Written by: Ryan Koh
- Production code: QABF04
- Original air date: January 3, 2021

Guest appearances
- Dan Aykroyd as Postage Stamp Fellow; Bob Balaban as the narrator

Episode chronology
← Previous "A Springfield Summer Christmas for Christmas"	Next → "Diary Queen"
- The Simpsons season 32

"The Dad-Feelings Limited" is the 11th episode of the thirty-second season of the American animated television series The Simpsons, and the 695th episode overall. It aired in the United States on Fox on January 3, 2021. The episode was directed by Chris Clements and written by Ryan Koh.

In this episode, Kumiko wants to have a baby with Comic Book Guy, but he is hesitant due to his family history. Dan Aykroyd and Bob Balaban guest starred. The episode received positive reviews.

The episode's title is a reference to the Wes Anderson film The Darjeeling Limited, which has a similar story of doubtful fatherhood.

== Plot ==
Comic Book Guy and his wife Kumiko enjoy a lazy Sunday while Marge and Homer attend multiple children's birthday parties. Desperate for adult company, Marge and Homer leave the kids with Ned Flanders and go to Moe's for trivia night. Teaming up with Comic Book Guy and Kumiko, they win first place, and Marge and Kumiko relate over having overweight husbands. When Kumiko visits Marge, she bonds with Maggie and tells her husband she wants to have a child. Comic Book Guy, who works with children at his store every day and knows that he is an emotionally distant man, does not want to become a father.

Kumiko arranges for her husband to attend a movie with the Simpsons, and he finds he truly enjoys introducing Bart and Lisa to classic movies. When the children become upset, however, he is unable to comfort them, and returns to his family home, where his philatelist father and other obsessive relatives live alone with their collections. It is then revealed that Comic Book Guy took solace in comic books as a child solely because his father never attended any of his beloved baseball games, causing him to choke during the championship. His father later admits that he did not go to the game for fear he would not know what to say if his son lost, but produces a ball autographed by his son's hero, Sandy Koufax, that he had intended to give him. The pair play a game of catch, and Comic Book Guy returns to his wife, telling her that he is now ready to start a family.

== Production ==
=== Casting ===
Dan Aykroyd guest-starred in the episode as Postage Stamp Fellow, Bob Balaban appeared as the narrator, and Jenny Yokobori appeared as Kumiko. The episode marked the first appearance of Yokobori as Kumiko, replacing previous actor Tress MacNeille. This followed the show's announcement that white actors would no longer voice non-white characters.

=== Development ===
In 2020, Fox released eight promotional pictures from the episode.

=== Release ===
The episode originally aired on January 3, 2021, at 9:01 PM.

== Reception ==
=== Viewing figures ===
In the United States, the episode was watched live by 1.89 million viewers.

=== Critical response ===
Tony Sokol with Den of Geek, said "The Simpsons goes back to the past to make way for the future on Season 32, episode 11. “The Dad Feelings-Limited” is an origin story, revealing the sad and lonely tale of Comic Book Guy. No, it isn't done in panel layouts, and his super strength turns out to be his greatest weakness." He gave the episode 4.5/5 stars.

Jesse Bereta of Bubbleblabber gave the episode a 7.5 out of 10. He was surprised by the story about Comic Book Guy and enjoyed the deeper look into the character. He liked how the Simpson family was involved in the plot instead of having its own story. He also thought the Wes Anderson parody format balanced the dramatic elements.

It was selected as one of the best TV episodes of 2021 in the New York Times.

=== Awards and nominations ===
The episode was nominated for the Primetime Emmy Award for Outstanding Animated Program at the 73rd Primetime Creative Arts Emmy Awards, but lost to the Primal episode "Plague of Madness".
