= I, Carumbus =

- The Simpsons episode
- Promotional poster parodying Caligula
- Episode no.: Season 32; Episode 2
- Directed by: Rob Oliver
- Written by: Cesar Mazariegos
- Production code: ZABF18
- Original air date: October 4, 2020

Guest appearances
- Joe Mantegna as Gordus Antonius; Michael Palin as Museum Curator

Episode chronology
← Previous "Undercover Burns"	Next → "Now Museum, Now You Don't"
- The Simpsons season 32

"I, Carumbus" is the second episode of the thirty-second season of the American animated television series The Simpsons, and the 686th episode overall. It aired in the United States on Fox on October 4, 2020. The episode was directed by Rob Oliver, and written by Cesar Mazariegos. Mike Duncan was the Roman history consultant.

Michael Palin and Joe Mantegna appear in the episode as the museum curator and Gordus Antonius, respectively. The episode is a historical parody reimagining to I, Claudius and Caligula, features the Simpson family learning about ancient Rome. It received generally positive reviews from critics, and watched live in the United States by 1.51 million viewers.

== Plot ==
While the Simpson family visits a museum exhibit on Ancient Rome, Marge chastises a bored Homer for his lack of ambition when he admits to shirking chances for promotion. The curator overhears their argument and begins to relay the tale of Obeseus the Wide (played by Homer), the son of a poor farmer.

While years of toil make Obeseus strong, his father Abus (played by Grampa Simpson) sells him to the Roman slave master Gordus Antonius (played by Fat Tony) who puts Obeseus in the gladiatorial fighting pits. Obeseus' actions catch the eye of his master's daughter Marjora (played by Marge), who seduces him and gets pregnant. When her father demands that the slave who impregnated his daughter reveal himself, Obeseus comes forward and is freed from slavery so he can marry her. Marjora gives birth to their twin children, Bartigula and Lisandra (played by Bart and Lisa), and Gordus gives Obeseus control of his laundry business and his former slave friends as a wedding present.

Years later, Obeseus runs the laundry business into the ground through his incompetence. When the ambitious Marjora tells him to get his act together, Obeseus's slave friends suggest gathering ammonia (used in the cleaning process) by placing pots near drinking establishments. Obeseus and his family became rich and moved to the new land, only for Marjora to push her husband into joining the Senate to raise their status further. Obeseus asks Emperor Quimbus (played by Mayor Quimby) to put him in the Senate, but he refuses. However, his "politically adopted" son, Senator Montimus (played by Mr. Burns), offers Obeseus a position in the Senate if he assassinates Quimbus. He reluctantly does so, and Montimus crowns himself emperor and appoints Obeseus to the Senate.

The next 10 years later, Obeseus becomes rich and powerful (and fat), but his ignorance prevents him from freeing his friends and spending his life with his children. Seeing the crisis that plagued Rome, Marjora tells Obeseus to kill Emperor Montimus to gain more power and become one himself. When Obeseus refuses to do it, Marjora kills the emperor by poisoning his drink, allowing Bartigula to claim the throne. After he is crowned emperor, Bartigula the Jerk declares war on Neptune, builds a massive wall across Rome, and dissolves the Senate (by dousing its members with acid).

When he eventually starts losing Rome with his ways, Bartigula goes mad with power and declares himself a god. Realizing Bartigula's treason, Obeseus stands up against his son by accusing him of being a tyrant, and rallies everyone to turn against him, only to be arrested and sentenced to be eaten by the lions. Obeseus takes his friends with him as his "belongings," and they remind him once again of the pact he never fulfilled. When Lisandra tries to save Homer, he refuses and challenges his son to a gladiatorial battle. The ensuing fight results in their deaths, driving Marjora to commit suicide, and leaving Rome to burn to the ground.

Back in the present, the Simpson family argues about the moral of the tale, and the curator laments letting stupid people into museums.

During the credits, the Roman gods watch the argument, which they have been viewing for years. Minerva complains that the argument has declined in quality, but Jupiter states that he wants to watch it to the end because he has already invested so much time in it, and "it feels like they're wrapping it up".

== Production ==
=== Development ===
The title of the episode, as well as its writing credit, were revealed on November 18, 2019, and its directorial credit was revealed on February 18, 2020. The release date of "I, Carumbus" was announced on August 6, 2020. This is the first episode of the series written by Cesar Mazariegos. Political history podcaster Mike Duncan was hired as a Roman history consultant for the episode.

=== Casting ===
On July 25, 2020, it was announced during the series' panel at Comic-Con @ Home that Michael Palin would be guest-starring during the season. It was later revealed that his appearance would take place in this episode, and that he would be portraying the Museum Curator. Though not officially announced, other than on the promotional posters, Joe Mantegna also appears in the episode as Gordus Antonius (Fat Tony).

Michael Palin spoke positively of his experience working on the episode, saying that it was "lovely" to be asked and that he looked forward to seeing how his character looked after his recording. "To be asked to do a sort of guest appearance on The Simpsons is pretty much like going to Buckingham Palace, except not quite as funny!" Palin was quoted to say, referencing himself being knighted the previous year. "It's all done very quickly, efficiently and you are shoehorned into the show."

== Marketing ==
Promotional posters for the episode were released on September 30, 2020. Also on 2020, Fox released eight promotional pictures from the episode.

== Reception ==
=== Viewing figures ===
In the United States, the episode was watched live by 1.51 million viewers.

=== Critical response ===
Tony Sokol with Den of Geek said, "It is one of the many episodes which will get funnier on repeated viewings. It won't produce more laughs, but the references will seem more clever. There is a little too much respect and consideration for history's follies than the majority of episodes like this" and he gave the episode 3 and half out of 5 stars.

Jesse Bereta of Bubbleblabber gave the episode a 9 out of 10. He called the episode "ambitious, impressive, and entertaining." He thought the show was able to successfully reimagine Springfield as the Roman Empire, and several viewings would be required to catch all the jokes.

=== Awards and nominations ===
Writer Cesar Mazariegos was nominated for a Writers Guild of America Award for Television: Animation for this episode at the 73rd Writers Guild of America Awards.
