= Nik Ranieri =

Canadian animator (born 1961)

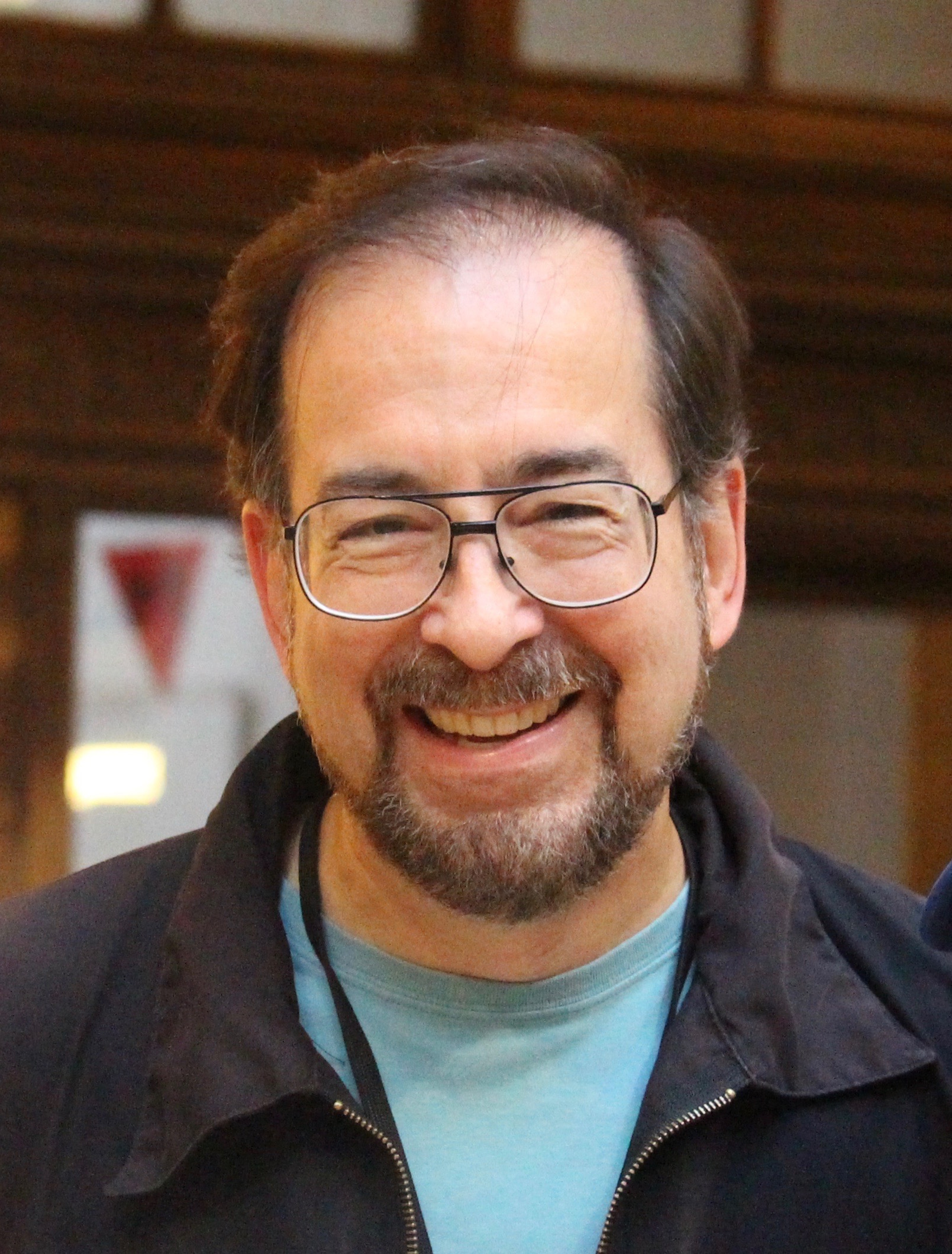
- Ranieri in 2015
- Born: August 23, 1961 (age 65); Toronto, Ontario, Canada
- Education: Sheridan College
- Occupation: Animator
- Employer: Walt Disney Animation Studios (1987–2013; 2023)
- Awards: Annie Award, 1995; Annie Award, 1997; NCS Division Award, 1997; 73rd Primetime Creative Arts Emmy Awards, Outstanding Individual Achievement In Animation, 2021; 75th Primetime Creative Arts Emmy Awards, Outstanding Individual Achievement In Animation, 2023

Nik Ranieri (born August 23, 1961) is a Canadian character animator who is primarily known for his work at Walt Disney Animation Studios. He has been supervising animator of many characters and remained so until his layoff in 2013.

== Career ==
After graduating from the Classical Animation Program at Sheridan College in Oakville, Ontario, Ranieri went to work for Atkinson Film-Arts animation production studio (in Ottawa, Ontario).

He began animating for Disney in 1987 on the London, England-based animation crew of Who Framed Roger Rabbit, working with director Richard Williams. Soon after that he moved to Disney's feature animation studio in Glendale, California, where he animated on The Little Mermaid (working primarily on the character of Ursula the sea witch, under directing animator Ruben Aquino). On his next film, Ranieri was promoted to supervising animator on the character of Wilbur in The Rescuers Down Under.

In 1995, he won an Annie Award in the category 'Individual Achievement in Character Animation' for his animation of the raccoon Meeko in Pocahontas.

In 1997, he won an Annie Award in the category 'Individual Achievement in Character Animation' for his animation of Hades in Hercules.

While Ranieri is regarded as one of the modern-day masters of hand-drawn character animation (especially excelling in subtle dialogue scenes and facial expressions) he also successfully made the switch to animating in CG on films such as Chicken Little, Meet the Robinsons and Bolt. Ranieri returned to his roots in classic hand-drawn animation for the 2009 Disney animated film The Princess and the Frog.

On April 6, 2013, The Walt Disney Company announced that Ranieri, along with eight other animators working at Walt Disney Animation Studios, had been laid off in an effort for the company as a whole to cut costs.

He later worked at Studio Roqovan, where he worked on the video game World War Toons, up until the studio closed in 2019. Ranieri won the Outstanding Individual Achievement In Animation award in 2021 at the 73rd Primetime Creative Arts Emmy Awards as Lead Character Layout for The Simpsons episode "Wad Goals".

== Filmography ==
Year	Title	Credits	Characters	Notes
1980	The All-Night Show (TV Series)	Animator		
1985	The Body Electric (TV Movie)	Animator		
1985	The Raccoons (TV Series)	Animator - 7 Episodes		
1988	Who Framed Roger Rabbit	Animator	Roger Rabbit	
1989	Cranium Command (Short)	Animator		
1989	The Little Mermaid	Character Animator	Ursula	
1990	The Rescuers Down Under	Supervising Animator	Wilbur	
1991	Beauty and the Beast	Supervising Animator	Lumiere	
1992	Aladdin	Animator	Jafar	
1994	Chariots of Fur (Short)	Animator		
1995	Pocahontas	Supervising Animator / Additional Story Development Artist	Meeko	
1997	Hercules	Supervising Animator	Hades	
2000	Fantasia 2000	Character Designer - Segment "Piano Concerto No. 2, Allegro, Opus 102"		
2000	The Emperor's New Groove	Supervising Animator	Kuzco/Kuzco Llama	
2002	Treasure Planet	Animator	Doctor Delbert Doppler	
2005	Chicken Little	Supervising Animator	Buck "Ace" Cluck	
2007	Meet the Robinsons	Supervising Animator	Lewis	
2008	Bolt	Animator		
2009	The Princess and the Frog	Supervising Animator	Charlotte "Lottie" La Bouff	
2010	Tangled	Animator	Mother Gothel	
2011	Winnie the Pooh	Additional Animator		
2014	The Prophet	Hand-Drawn Animation Supervisor		
2016	World War Toons (Video Game)	Animation Director		
2023	Once Upon a Studio (Short)	Animator		

=== Awards ===
- 1995 Annie Awards for Best Individual Achievement for Animation for 'Meeko' in Pocahontas
- 1997 Annie Awards for Best Individual Achievement: Character Animation for 'Hades' in Hercules
- 1997 'NCS Division Awards' in Feature Animation (for Hades)
- 2021 Primetime Creative Arts Emmy Awards for Outstanding Individual Achievement In Animation for "Wad Goals" from The Simpsons
- 2023 Primetime Creative Arts Emmy Awards for Outstanding Individual Achievement In Animation for "Lisa the Boy Scout" from The Simpsons
