= Undercover Burns =

- The Simpsons episode
- Episode no.: Season 32; Episode 1
- Directed by: Bob Anderson
- Written by: David Cryan
- Production code: ZABF19
- Original air date: September 27, 2020

Guest appearances
- David Harbour as Fred Kranepool; Phil Rosenthal as himself

Episode features
- Couch gag: After the Simpsons rush to the couch, they fall down. The camera moves back to reveal a green screen with Nelson sitting at a computer. He laughs and says "Ha-Ha, green screen."

Episode chronology
← Previous "The Way of the Dog"	Next → "I, Carumbus"
- The Simpsons season 32

"Undercover Burns" is the thirty-second season premiere of the American animated television series The Simpsons, and the 685th episode overall. It aired in the United States on Fox on September 27, 2020. The episode was directed by Bob Anderson and written by David Cryan.

David Harbour guest-stars as Mr. Burns's undercover persona Fred, and Phil Rosenthal appears as himself. This is also the first episode that Alex Désert voices Carl Carlson, taking over the role from Hank Azaria. The episode's title is a reference to the television franchise Undercover Boss.

The episode featured Mr. Burns going undercover at his company, the Springfield Nuclear Power Plant, similar to the format of Undercover Boss. It received generally positive reviews and was watched live in the United States by 4.44 million viewers.

== Plot ==
Lisa and Bart go to the power plant with Homer for "Take Your Child to Work Day", but Mr. Burns decides to change it into "Put Your Child to Work Day". All of the children are forced to work, but Lisa escapes and confronts Mr. Burns about the abuse of child labor laws. Mr. Burns decides to hide in the employee restroom. While in the restroom, Mr. Burns sees unflattering graffiti on the walls, and soon realizes that his employees don't like him.

Smithers decides to help a distraught Mr. Burns go undercover as a man named Fred Kranepool. During his undercover operation, Mr. Burns plans to "infiltrate and kill" disloyal employees, but ends up befriending Homer, Lenny, and Carl. Smithers becomes jealous of all the time Mr. Burns is spending with the employees and eventually tells Homer that Fred is actually a disguised Mr. Burns. His scheme exposed, Mr. Burns reverts to his old, tyrannical self.

== Production ==
=== Development ===
The episode was written by David Cryan, who reached out to showrunner Al Jean on Twitter, asking Jean to read some scripts he had written. Cryan was hoping to be given the opportunity to submit a script for The Simpsons, but Jean was impressed enough by Cryan's scripts, particularly those for Veep and Curb Your Enthusiasm, that he invited Cryan to join the show's writing staff. However, Cryan was unable to accept the offer, because Cryan, who lives in Canada, had his United States visa application denied. So, Jean instead offered him a freelance opportunity to write an episode. Cryan chose to write an episode surrounding his favorite character of Mr. Burns, it is Cryan's first television episode.

=== Casting ===
David Harbour guest-starred in the episode as Mr. Burns' undercover persona Fred and Phil Rosenthal appeared as himself. Rosenthal previously portrayed TV Dad in The Simpsons Movie. This is also the first episode with Alex Désert voicing Carl Carlson, taking over from Hank Azaria who voiced the character since the first season. This came after the producers of the series announced that "Moving forward, The Simpsons will no longer have white actors voice non-white characters."

=== Music ===
The episode features "Why Can't We Be Friends" by War, "Bang the Drum All Day" by Todd Rundgren and "The Spaniard That Blighted My Life" by Billy Merson.

== Marketing ==
Jean released a still from the episode on September 9, 2020, on Twitter. Also on September 9, 2020, Fox released eight promotional pictures from the episode.

== Reception ==
=== Viewing figures ===
In the United States, the episode was watched live by 4.44 million viewers.

=== Critical response ===
Tony Sokol with Den of Geek, said "'Undercover Burns' makes for a fun and informative season premiere episode. Mr. Burns always delivers, except on any promises he's made." He gave the episode four out of five stars.

Kevin Melrose with CBR, said "those longtime critics who insist The Simpsons peaked in 1993 will no doubt point to the Season 32 premiere as only the latest supporting evidence. From the green screen couch gag to its parody of Undercover Boss, a reality series that's been on the air for more than a decade, 'Undercover Burns' is hardly cutting edge. And yet, the episode still surprises."
