= Billy Jensen =

American journalist and author

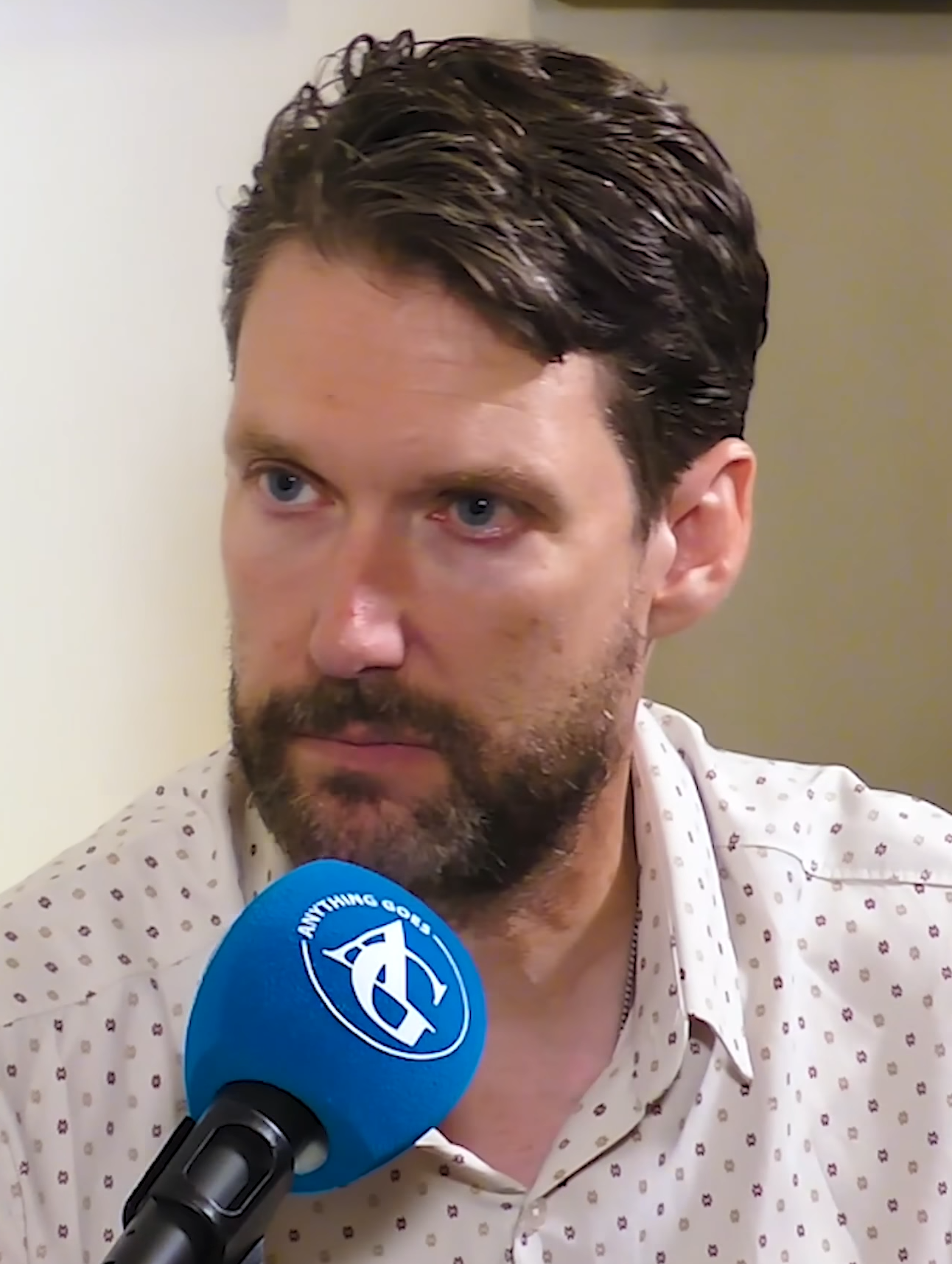
- Citizenship: United States
- Education: University of Kansas
- Occupations: Journalist author producer podcaster
- Years active: 1997–present

Billy Jensen is an American investigative journalist, author, producer, and podcaster. He is known for his work in the true crime genre, including co-hosting the Discovery+ podcast and the associated television mini-series Unraveled: The Real Story of the Long Island Serial Killer, and the podcasts The First Degree, and Jensen & Holes: The Murder Squad. He is also the author of the books Chase Darkness with Me: How One True Crime Writer Started Solving Murders, and Killer Amidst Killers: Hunting Serial Killers Operating Under the Cloak of America's Opioid Epidemic. He was chosen by Patton Oswalt to finish Michelle McNamara’s book, I'll Be Gone In The Dark, and served as co-executive producer on the related HBO documentary.

== Early life and education ==
Jensen grew up in Westbury, Long Island, New York City. He earned a master's degree in religious studies from the University of Kansas. While at the university, he helped found the school's hockey team. He briefly played for the New York Riot in the professional roller hockey league Major League Roller Hockey.

== Career ==
=== In newspapers ===
After graduating, Jensen self-published the The Fight Card, which chronicled every fight during the 1996–1997 New York Islanders season. The magazine led to an offer to write a story for the Long Island Voice, his first paid journalism job. He worked as a writer and editor at the Long Island Voice. He began working as a crime reporter in 1999. After serving as an editor for two pop culture magazines, Jensen helped start the alternative newspaper The Long Island Press and served as its managing editor. From 2005 to 2006, he was editor-in-chief of The Boston Phoenix. He also held a management role at Village Voice Media.

=== In crime reporting ===
In 2016, Jensen began working with law enforcement as a crime investigation consultant. He managed digital operations and served as an on-air reporter for the television series Crime Watch Daily. He also filmed a pilot for a cable true crime documentary series called Crowdsolve, which the network ultimately passed on.

After the death of true crime author Michelle McNamara in 2016, Jensen collaborated with Paul Haynes and Patton Oswalt to complete her book I’ll Be Gone in the Dark, which was published in 2018. During the press tour for I'll Be Gone in the Dark, Jensen met Karen Kilgariff and Georgia Hardstark, who offered him a chance to join their podcast network, Exactly Right, leading to the creation of the podcast Jensen and Holes: The Murder Squad, which he co-hosted with former sheriff's investigator Paul Holes. The show ended in 2022 amid allegations of sexual misconduct against Jensen began to surface, who entered rehab for alcohol addiction that summer.

Alongside fellow investigative journalist Alexis Linkletter, Jensen co-hosted the Discovery+ podcast and television special Unraveled: The Real Story of the Long Island Serial Killer, released in 2021.

Jensen has used crowdsourced tips to investigate crimes. He has written for publications such as Rolling Stone, Los Angeles Magazine, and the New York Times.

=== As crime author ===
In 2019, Jensen released the book Chase Darkness with Me. In the book, Jensen where he detailed his crime investigation experiences, including his use of electronic tools like social media and geotagging to identify murder suspects. It was released as an Audible Original, and the book became a New York Times bestseller.

In 2021, Jensen co-hosted the Discovery+ podcast and television special Unraveled: The Real Story of the Long Island Serial Killer, with fellow investigative journalist Alexis Linkletter.

In Jensen's next book, Killer Amidst Killers, he examined the homicides of several women in Columbus, Ohio, amid the opioid epidemic.

=== Producer ===
Jensen served as co-executive producer of the HBO docuseries adaptation of I'll Be Gone in the Dark, which aired in 2020.

Jensen produced and co-starred in the Investigation Discovery series Unraveled, with the first season focusing on the Long Island Serial Killer investigation.

=== Allegations ===
In May 2022, Jensen was removed from the Murder Squad podcast after facing allegations of sexual misconduct. Since then, several women have come forward with additional allegations of sexual misconduct. That summer, he checked into rehab for alcohol addiction.

== Bibliography ==
- Jensen, B. (2019). Chase Darkness with Me: How One True-crime Writer Started Solving Murders. United States: Sourcebooks, Incorporated.
- Jensen, B. (2023). Killers Amidst Killers: Murder, An Opioid Epidemic and A Hunt for Justice. United Kingdom: Icon Books.

== Filmography ==
Year	Film or TV Series	Role	Comments
2015-2016	Crime Watch Daily	supervising producer	TV Series, 194 episodes
2017	#crowdsolve	Actor	TV Movie
2018	Still Standing	Production Assistant	TV Series
2020	I'll Be Gone in the Dark	co-executive producer	Docuseries
2021	Unraveled: The Long Island Serial Killer	executive producer	TV Movie
2021	Unraveled: The Stalker's Web	executive producer	TV Special
2021-2022	Unraveled	executive producer	Podcast series, 41 episodes
