= I'll Be Gone in the Dark (TV series) =

American true crime documentary series

- Genre: True crime; Documentary
- Based on: I'll Be Gone in the Dark by Michelle McNamara
- Narrated by: Amy Ryan
- Music by: Philip Sheppard
- Opening theme: "Avalanche" by Aimee Mann
- Country of origin: United States
- Original language: English
- No. of episodes: 7

Production
- Executive producers: Liz Garbus; Dan Cogan; Michelle McNamara; Patton Oswalt; Dave Rath; Nancy Abraham; Lisa Heller
- Producers: Elizabeth Wolff; Kate Barry
- Cinematography: Thorsten Thielow
- Editors: Jawad Metni; Alyse Ardell Spiegel; Erin Barnett; Samuel Nalband
- Running time: 55–60 minutes
- Production companies: HBO Documentary Films; Story Syndicate

Original release
- Network: HBO
- Release: June 28, 2020 – June 21, 2021

I'll Be Gone in the Dark is an American true crime documentary television series directed by Liz Garbus, Elizabeth Wolff, Myles Kane and Josh Koury, revolving around Michelle McNamara as she writes a book about and investigates the Golden State Killer. The original six-part series premiered on June 28, 2020, on HBO, and concluded on August 2, 2020. A special episode premiered on June 21, 2021.

== Premise ==
Michelle McNamara lived a quiet life, but as her family slept, she spent the night investigating and writing a book about the Golden State Killer, delving into the world of online chat rooms and crime blogs. She hid her addiction to opioids, which ultimately contributed to her death prior to the completion of her book.

The title of the book and documentary is taken from a threat made by the Golden State Killer during his 1976 attack upon his tenth victim, then-15-year-old Kris Pedretti, to whom he said, "Do what I say or I'll kill you and be gone in the dark".

== Episodes ==
No.	Title	Directed by	Original release date	U.S. viewers (millions)
1	"Murder Habit"	Liz Garbus	June 28, 2020	0.408
Writer Michelle McNamara, author of the True Crime Diary blog, is interested in some gruesome crimes committed between the 1970s and 1980s in California by an unknown culprit known as "East Area Rapist" and the "Original Night Stalker". After pitching a story to Los Angeles Magazine, she begins to dig into it.
2	"Reign of Terror"	Elizabeth Wolff	July 5, 2020	0.402
Local detectives who worked the EAR ("East Area Rapist") and survivors describe how they were scarred by crimes in the 1970s, with particular attention to the role that media coverage and social stigma played in the investigation.
3	"Rat in a Maze"	Myles Kane; Josh Koury	July 12, 2020	0.366
As the attacks cease in Northern California, the "Original Night Stalker" reign of terror begins in Santa Barbara. Lack of communication between different jurisdictions hinder links between crimes. ‌Michelle's article on the case, "In the Footsteps of a Killer", causes a splash when it's published 2013 and she signs a contract for a book.
4	"The Motherlode"	Josh Koury; Myles Kane	July 19, 2020	0.451
The deadline for the book weighs on Michelle. Meanwhile, she and researcher Paul Haynes investigate "Visalia Ransacker", the perpetrator of a string of burglaries in the early 1970s bearing striking similarities to EAR/ONS, dubbed "Golden State Killer" by McNamara. They have access to 37 boxes of files archived at the Orange County Sheriff's Department.
5	"Monsters Recede but Never Vanish"	Elizabeth Wolff	July 26, 2020	0.451
Michelle's sudden death from an accidental overdose leaves friends and family distraught but also determined to continue her crusade. Michelle's husband, Patton Oswalt, researcher Paul Haynes, and true crime writer Billy Jensen finish the book that becomes a bestseller. Paul Holes, Chief of Forensics in Contra Costa County, reconstructs the killer's family tree with the help of genetic genealogist Barbara Rae-Venter following advice from Michelle. This leads to the arrest of 72-year-old former police officer Joseph James DeAngelo.
6	"Walk into the Light"	Liz Garbus	August 2, 2020	0.523
Joseph James DeAngelo is charged and tried for the murders. Although Michelle did not live to see this, her persistence and research helped bring justice to the victims. Survivors of the attacks and relatives of DeAngelo offer their insights into the cases.
7	"Show Us Your Face"	Elizabeth Wolff	June 21, 2021	0.198

== Production ==
In April 2018, HBO Documentary Films acquired rights to I'll Be Gone in the Dark by Michelle McNamara, with plans to adapt the book into a docuseries, with her husband Patton Oswalt serving as an executive producer. Production on the series began on April 24, 2018. In May 2018, it was announced Liz Garbus would direct the series. McNamara's researcher Paul Haynes and crime journalist Billy Jensen, both of whom helped Oswalt finish the book, were signed on as co-executive producers. The series features interviews with detectives, survivors, family members, and Amy Ryan narrating excerpts from McNamara's book.

== Reception ==
=== Critical response ===
Review aggregator Rotten Tomatoes reported an approval rating of 96% based on 48 reviews, with an average rating of 8.5/10. The website's critical consensus reads, "Director Liz Garbus smartly centers I'll Be Gone in the Dark around the late Michelle McNamara's passionate efforts, weaving together a heavy, but important tapestry of trauma, obsession, and survival. Metacritic gave the series a weighted average score of 80 out of 100 based on 22 reviews, indicating "universal acclaim".

=== Ratings ===
Viewership and ratings per episode of I'll Be Gone in the Dark
No.	Title	Air date	Rating (18–49)	Viewers (millions)	DVR (18–49)	DVR viewers (millions)	Total (18–49)	Total viewers (millions)
1	"Murder Habit"	June 28, 2020	0.1	0.408	0.1	0.354	0.2	0.762
2	"Reign of Terror"	July 5, 2020	0.1	0.402	—N/a	0.321	—N/a	0.723
3	"Rat in a Maze"	July 12, 2020	0.1	0.366	0.1	0.340	0.2	0.706
4	"The Motherlode"	July 19, 2020	0.1	0.451	0.1	0.374	0.2	0.825
5	"Monsters Recede but Never Vanish"	July 26, 2020	0.1	0.451	0.1	0.394	0.2	0.845
6	"Walk into the Light"	August 2, 2020	0.1	0.523	0.1	0.347	0.2	0.870
7	"Show Us Your Face"	June 21, 2021	0.0	0.198	0.0	0.147	0.1	0.345
