= Laura Karpman =

American composer

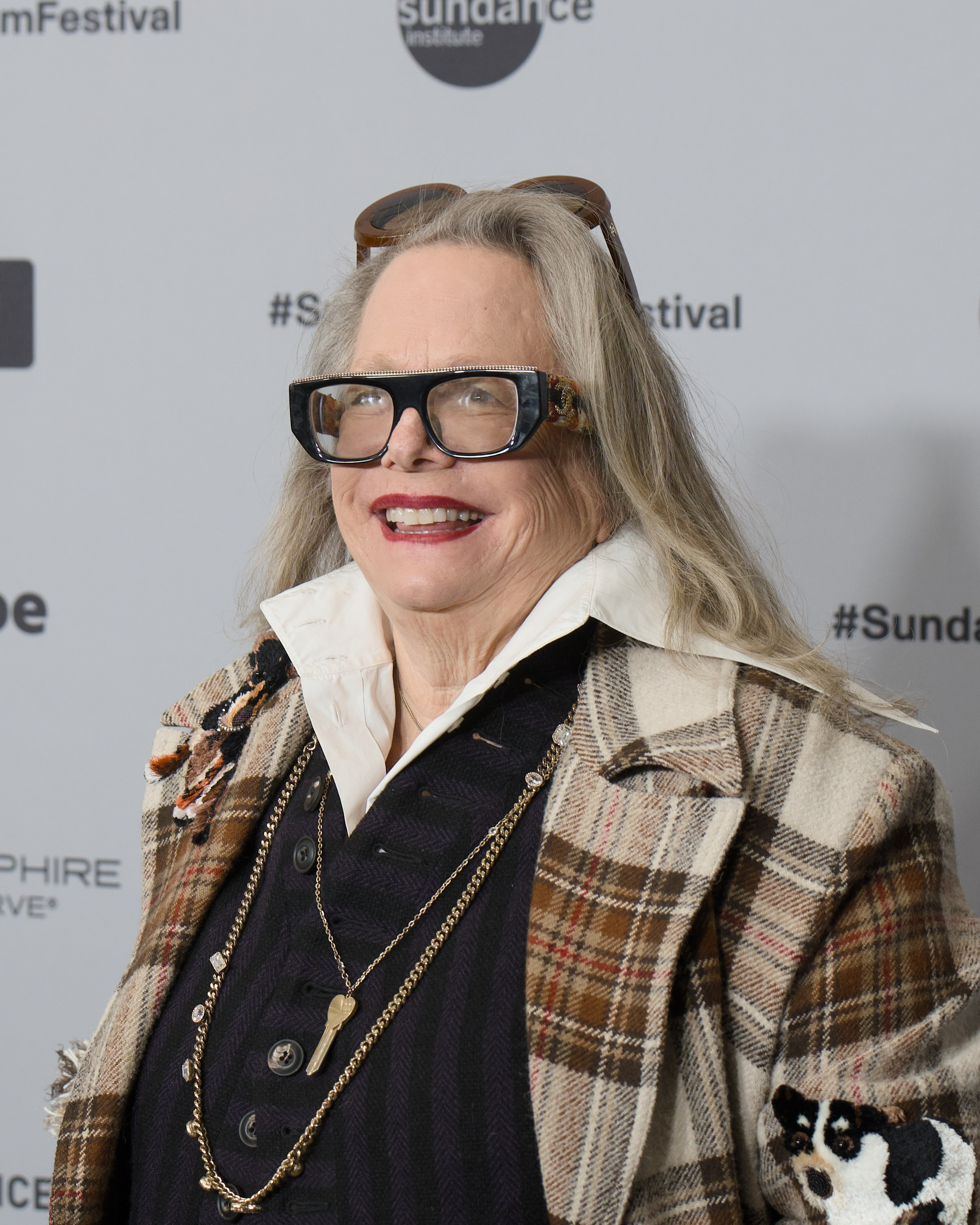
- Karpman in 2026

Background information
- Born: Laura Anne Karpman; 1958 or 1959 (age 67–68); Los Angeles, California, U.S.
- Genres: Film and television scores, video game scores, soundtracks, jazz, electronic
- Occupation: Film composer
- Instruments: Vocals, piano, keyboards, synthesizer
- Years active: 1994–present
- Spouse: Nora Kroll-Rosenbaum
- Website: laurakarpman.com

Laura Anne Karpman is an American composer whose work has included music for film, television, video games, theater, and the concert hall. She has won five Emmy Awards for her work, as well as an Academy Award nomination for Best Original Score. Karpman was trained at the Juilliard School, where she played jazz by day and performed in bars at night. Her scores include the television series Taken and The Living Edens, and the video game EverQuest II.

== Early life and education ==
Karpman was born in Los Angeles and grew up singing opera and jazz. Her mother, a painter and sculptor, wanted her to grow up to be a composer and surrounded Karpman with music even before she was born. Karpman began her first compositions at the age of 7.

She worked with John Harbison at the Tanglewood Music Center, and attended Aspen Music School and the Ecole des Arts Americaines. At the University of Michigan, she graduated magna cum laude with a Bachelor of Music degree studying with William Bolcom and Leslie Bassett. She received both her Doctorate and Master's Degree in Music Composition at the Juilliard School, where her principal teacher was Milton Babbitt. At Juilliard, Karpman also received mentorship from Nadia Boulanger.

== Career ==
Compositions by Karpman have been commissioned by Tonya Pinkins, Los Angeles Opera, American Composers Orchestra, Czech Philharmonic, the Juilliard Choral Union, Pacific Serenades, and percussionist Evelyn Glennie. They have been performed internationally. Karpman's theater catalog includes three musicals for Los Angeles's "A Noise Within" theater company, as well as underscores for dozens of classic plays. Among her media music credits are Steven Spielberg's Emmy-winning, 20-hour TV miniseries, Taken; and PBS's series The Living Edens (for which she received nine Emmy nominations). She has scored numerous films, television programs and video games (including music for supplemental Halo 3 materials and her award-winning score for EverQuest II).

She has held a residency at Sony Online Entertainment. Karpman received an Annie Award nomination for A Monkey's Tale, a short film commissioned by the Chinese government, which later premiered in the US and was performed by the Detroit Symphony.

Karpman's Grammy-winning Ask Your Mama premiered at Carnegie Hall on March 16, 2009, with performances by Jessye Norman, Cassandra Wilson, The Roots, and the Orchestra of St. Luke's conducted by George Manahan. With Langston Hughes's epic poem for a libretto, Karpman also took passages from Louis Armstrong, Big Maybelle, Pigmeat Markham and Bill "Bojangles" Robinson, integrated with projected images by Rico Gatson and additional archival video, as well as Hughes's own poetry. Ask Your Mama was released by Avie Records in July 2016. Later, Karpman created "The 110 Project", an opera work commissioned by the L.A. Opera as a homage to the city's first freeway, I-110, as seen through four characters from 1940-2010, the lifespan of the freeway.

In 2014, Karpman co-founded the Alliance for Women Film Composers with Lolita Ritmanis and Miriam Cutler. The organization provides visibility and advocacy for women composers. In 2016, Karpman became the first woman elected to the music branch of The Academy of Motion Picture Arts and Sciences Board of Governors.

Karpman composed the score for the Marvel Studios animated anthology series What If...? in 2021, the streaming series Ms. Marvel in 2022 and the score for the superhero film The Marvels in 2023. She composed the score for the 2023 film American Fiction, for which she received her first Academy Award nomination for Best Original Score.

In 2026, Karpman composed the score for Give Me the Ball!, a documentary about the life and legacy of Billie Jean King.

== Personal life ==
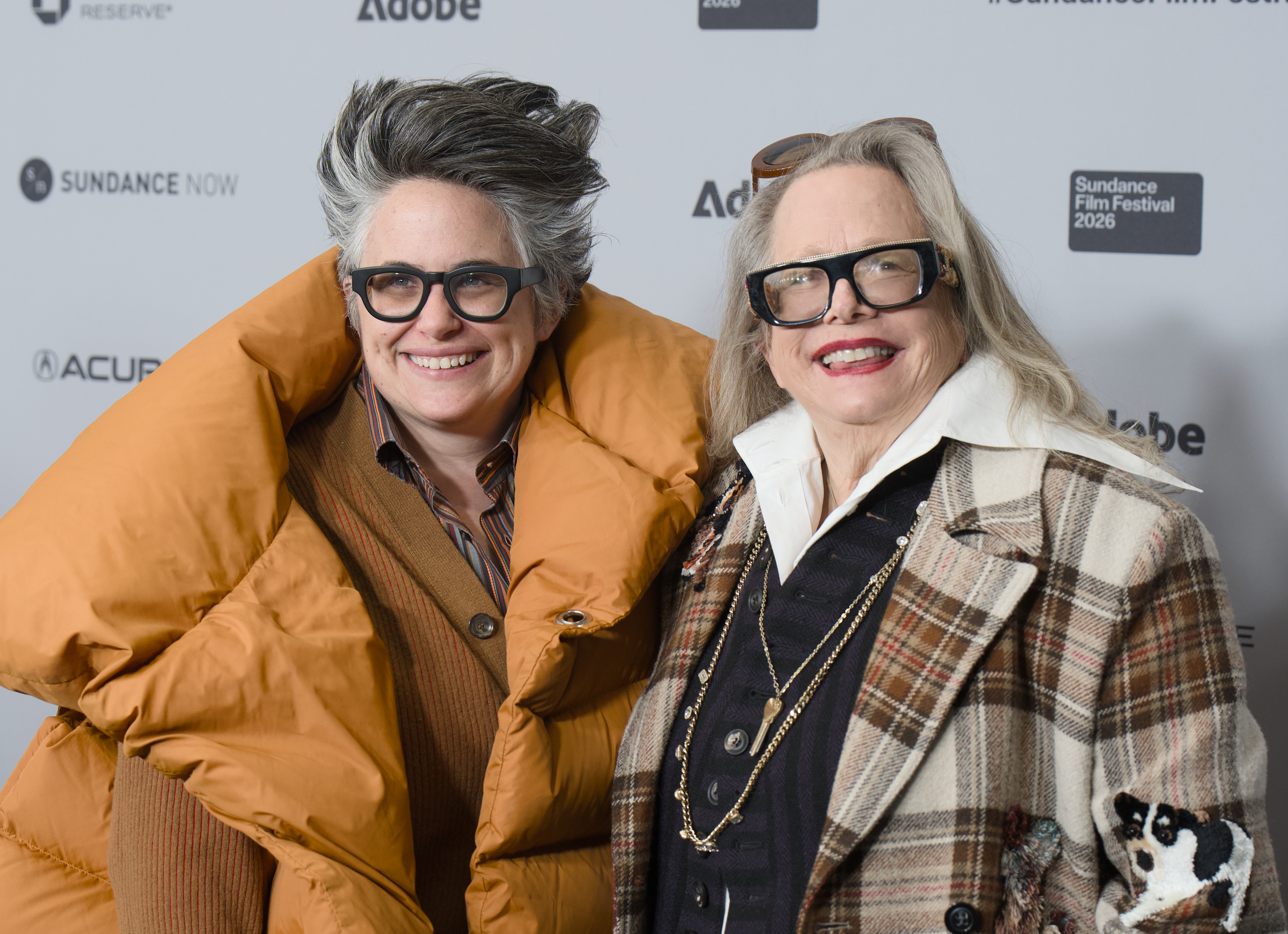
Karpman and Kroll-Rosenbaum in 2026

Karpman is married to composer Nora Kroll-Rosenbaum, a fellow Milton Babbitt student. They have one son and live in Playa del Rey, California, in a duplex with an ocean view and a built-in studio.

Karpman is known for a signature look: she wears two pairs of glasses, one pair on her face, and the other on her head. She has a self-described lifelong obsession for drama, including soap opera, classical operas, and plays.

== Filmography ==
=== Films ===
Year	Title	Director	Studio(s)
1995	Lover's Knot	Peter Shaner	Legacy Releasing
1999	The Annihilation of Fish	Charles Burnett	
2009	The Tournament	Scott Mann	Entertainment Film Distributors
2010	Nothing Special	Angela Garcia Combs	
2011	Something Ventured	Dayna Goldfine; Daniel Geller	
2013	Black Nativity	Kasi Lemmons	
2013	The Galapagos Affair	Dayna Goldfine; Daniel Geller	
2014	States of Grace	Helen Cohen; Mark Lipman	
2014	Regarding Susan Sontag	Nancy Kates	
2015	The State of Marriage	Jeff Kaufman	
2015	Code: Debugging the Gender Gap	Robin Hauser	
2016	Paris Can Wait	Eleanor Coppola	Lifetime Films; American Zoetrope
2016	The Cinema Travellers	Shirley Abraham; Amit Madheshiya	
2017	Step	Amanda Lipitz	Artemis Rising Foundation
2018	Phil's Camino: So Far, So Good	Annie O'Neil	
2018	Set It Up	Claire Scanlon	Treehouse Pictures
2018	Inventing Tomorrow	Laura Nix	Fishbowl Films; HHMI Tangled Bank Studios
2019	Sid & Judy	Stephen Kijak	Passion Pictures
2020	Paper Children	Alexandra Codina	CineMia
2020	Love Is Love Is Love	Eleanor Coppola	American Zoetrope
2020	Senior Moment	Giorgio Serafini	Goff Productions
2021	Pray Away	Kristine Stolakis	Artemis Rising Foundation; Blumhouse Productions; Chicken & Egg Pictures
2021	Resort to Love	Steven Tsuchida	AK Worldwide; The Malina Yarn Company; Story Ink
2022	Epic Bill	Quinnolyn Benson-Yates	Red Wrap Productions
2023	The Marvels	Nia DaCosta	Marvel Studios
2023	American Fiction	Cord Jefferson	Orion Pictures; MRC Film; T-Street Productions; 3 Arts Entertainment
2023	The Only Girl in the Orchestra	Molly O'Brien	LFR INDUSTRIES
2025	Captain America: Brave New World	Julius Onah	Marvel Studios
2026	Give Me the Ball!	Liz Garbus; Elizabeth Wolff	ESPN Films
2026	The Love Hypothesis	Claire Scanlon	MRC; Bisous Pictures; The Cantillon Company

=== Television ===
Year	Title	Studio(s)	Notes
1997–2003	The Living Edens	CBS Productions / BBC	24 episodes
2002	Taken	DreamWorks Television	10 episodes
2002	Carrie	Trilogy Entertainment Group; MGM Television	Television film
2002–2003	Odyssey 5	Columbia TriStar Domestic Television	19 episodes
2007–2022	Craft in America	—N/a	18 episodes
2016–2017	Underground	Sony Pictures Television	20 episodes
2019	L.A.'s Finest	Sony Pictures Television; Jerry Bruckheimer Television	13 episodes
2019	Why We Hate	Amblin Television	6 episodes Won - Primetime Emmy Award for Outstanding Music Composition for a Documentary Series or Special
2020	Lovecraft Country	Warner Bros. Television Studios; Monkeypaw Productions; Bad Robot	10 episodes
2021–2024	What If...?	Marvel Studios Animation	26 episodes Co-composed with Nora Kroll-Rosenbaum for seasons 2 and 3
2022	From Scratch	Netflix	8 episodes
2022	61st Street	AMC BBC Studios	16 episodes
2022	Ms. Marvel	Marvel Studios	6 episodes
2025–present	Marvel Zombies	Marvel Studios Animation	4 episodes Co-composed with Nora Kroll-Rosenbaum
2026	East of Eden	Netflix	7 episodes

=== Video games ===
Year	Title
2004	EverQuest II
2005	EverQuest II: The Splitpaw Saga
2006	EverQuest II: Kingdom of Sky
2006	Field Commander
2006	EverQuest II: The Fallen Dynasty
2006	Untold Legends: Dark Kingdom
2006	EverQuest: Prophecy of Ro
2007	EverQuest: The Buried Sea
2011	Kung Fu Panda 2
2012	Guardians of Middle-earth
2014	Project Spark

== Awards and nominations ==
Academy Awards

- 2024 nomination, "Best Original Score" for American Fiction

Academy of Motion Picture Arts and Sciences

- 2015 Membership Induction

American Academy of Arts and Letters

- 1984 win, "Charles Ives Award"

Annie Awards

- 2007 nomination, "Best Music in an Animated Feature Production" for A Monkey's Tale

BMI Film & TV Awards

- 2003 win, "BMI Cable Mini-Series Award" for Taken

Game Audio Network Guild Awards

- 2004 win, "Best Arrangement of a Non-Original Score" for Everquest II
- 2004 nomination, "Best Music of the Year" for Everquest II

Hollywood Music in Media Awards

- 2023 nomination, "Best Original Score in a Feature Film" for American Fiction
- 2023 win, "Best Original Score in a Sci-Fi/Fantasy Film" for The Marvels
- 2026 nomination, "Best Original Score – TV/Streamed Movie" for East of Eden
- 2026 win, "Best Original Score – Short Film (Documentary)" for Cosmic Symphany

News & Documentary Emmy Awards

- 2008 nomination, "Outstanding Individual Achievement in a Craft: Music and Sound" for Craft in America
- 2003 nomination, "Outstanding Individual Achievement in a Craft: Music and Sound" for The Living Edens for "Big Sur: California's Wild Coast". Nomination shared with Nancy Severinsen, Clifford Hoelscher, Mark Linden, and Tara Paul.
- 2001 nomination, "Outstanding Individual Achievement in a Craft – Music" for The Living Edens episode "Kamchatka: Siberia's Forbidden Wilderness"
- 2000 nominations, "Outstanding Achievement in a Craft in News and Documentary Programming – Music"
  - for The Living Edens episode "Costa Rica: Land of Pure Life"
  - for The Living Edens episode "Palau: Paradise of the Pacific"
- 1999 win, "Outstanding Achievement in a Craft in News and Documentary Programming – Music" for The Living Edens episode "Madagascar: A World Apart"
- 1998 win, "Outstanding Achievement in a Craft in News and Documentary Programming – Music" for The Living Edens episodes "Denali: Alaska's Great Wilderness", "Manu: Peru's Hidden Rain Forest", "Patagonia: Life at the End of the Earth"

Primetime Emmy Awards

- 2024 nomination, "Outstanding Music Composition for a Documentary Series or Special (Original Dramatic Score)" for Rock Hudson: All That Heaven Allowed
- 2023 nomination, "Outstanding Music Composition for a Limited or Anthology Series, Movie or Special (Original Dramatic Score)" for Ms. Marvel: Time and Again
- 2023 nomination, "Outstanding Original Main Title Theme Music" for Ms. Marvel
- 2021 nomination, "Outstanding Music Composition for a Series (Original Dramatic Score)" for Lovecraft Country: Rewind 1921
- 2020 win, "Outstanding Music Composition for a Documentary Series or Special (Original Dramatic Score)" for Why We Hate: Tools & Tactics
- 2020 nomination, "Outstanding Original Main Title Theme Music" for Why We Hate
- 2008 nomination, "Outstanding Music Composition for a Miniseries, Movie or a Special (Original Dramatic Score)" for Masters of Science Fiction: Jerry Was a Man
- 2003 nomination, "Outstanding Music Composition for a Series (Original Dramatic Score)" for Odyssey 5: Pilot

Satellite Awards

- 2024 win, Best Original Score, for American Fiction

Society of Composers & Lyricists Awards

- 2023 nomination, "Outstanding Original Score for a Studio Film" for American Fiction
