= Michelle McNamara =

American true crime writer (1970–2016)

- Born: Michelle Eileen McNamara; April 14, 1970; Oak Park, Illinois, U.S.
- Died: April 21, 2016 (aged 46); Los Angeles, California, U.S.
- Resting place: Forest Lawn Memorial Park
- Education: University of Notre Dame (BA); University of Minnesota (MFA)
- Occupation: Author
- Years active: 2006–2016
- Spouse: Patton Oswalt (m. 2005)
- Children: 1
- Website: truecrimediary.com (archived)

Michelle Eileen McNamara (April 14, 1970 – April 21, 2016) was an American true crime author. She was the author of the true crime book I'll Be Gone in the Dark: One Woman's Obsessive Search for the Golden State Killer, and helped coin the moniker "Golden State Killer" of the serial killer who was identified after her death as Joseph James DeAngelo. The book was released posthumously in February 2018, two months before the Golden State Killer case was solved; it was later adapted into the 2020 HBO documentary series I'll Be Gone in the Dark.

== Early life ==
McNamara was born on April 14, 1970, in Oak Park, Illinois, the youngest child of stay-at-home mother Rita (née Rigney) and trial lawyer Thomas W. McNamara. She had four older sisters and one older brother. Her parents were Irish Americans, and she was raised Catholic.

In 1988, she graduated from Oak Park and River Forest High School, where she was editor-in-chief of The Trapeze, the student newspaper, during her senior year. In 1992, she graduated from the University of Notre Dame with a BA in English. She earned an MFA in creative writing from the University of Minnesota.

In August 1992 she traveled to Northern Ireland, where she would work for one year. As recounted in the documentary adaptation of her book, I'll Be Gone in the Dark, it was during this time that she observed The Troubles. The documentary also reveals that on September 1, 1992, after having lived in Belfast for a month, McNamara was sexually assaulted by a man she worked for, an incident that would influence her drive to investigate the Golden State Killer. In 1997 she moved to Los Angeles with the intention of becoming a writer in the film and TV industry.

== Career ==
In 2006, McNamara launched her website TrueCrimeDiary. McNamara had a long-standing fascination with true crime originating from the unsolved murder of Kathleen Lombardo that happened two blocks from where she lived when she was young. In 2014, McNamara and true crime investigative journalist Billy Jensen were on a SXSW Interactive panel called "Citizen Dicks: Solving Murders With Social Media". McNamara and Jensen had a long-term friendship based on their shared passion for researching and writing about true crime.

McNamara became interested in the crimes of the unidentified rapist and murderer known as the East Area Rapist, Original Night Stalker and the Visalia Ransacker, among other epithets. Due in large part to McNamara's efforts in tying these crime clusters together in public consciousness after the EAR and ONS crimes were linked by DNA, the murderer was later to be known only as the Golden State Killer (GSK). She penned articles for Los Angeles magazine about the serial killer in 2013 and 2014. Paul Holes, an investigator for the Contra Costa County district attorney's office, stated that McNamara's dogged persistence and trustworthiness with sensitive information about GSK cases earned her an unusual level of cooperation from law enforcement officials. She then signed a book deal with HarperCollins and began to work on a book about the case.

Her book, I'll Be Gone in the Dark: One Woman's Obsessive Search for the Golden State Killer, was about two-thirds finished at her death. The manuscript was edited and completed by true crime writers Paul Haynes, Billy Jensen and her widower Patton Oswalt following her death in April 2016. The book, released posthumously on February 27, 2018, reached number 2 of The New York Times Best Seller list for non-fiction and number 1 of combined print and e-book, nonfiction. The book remained on the list for 15 weeks.

On April 9, 2018, HBO announced that it had purchased the rights for her book and was developing it into a documentary series. Filming for the series began on April 24, 2018. The documentary series, also titled I'll Be Gone in the Dark, is directed by Liz Garbus and premiered on June 28, 2020.

On the evening of April 24, 2018, authorities in California identified Joseph James DeAngelo as the Golden State Killer and arrested him at his home. Oswalt stated that authorities' use of the killer's nickname that McNamara coined was "proof of the impact of her work".

== Personal life ==
McNamara met her future husband, Patton Oswalt, one evening in 2002 when she went to a comedy club. She particularly enjoyed his set, in which he described Irish women as "kryptonite". As she left the club, she touched his arm, and said: "Irish girls. Nice." This spurred Oswalt's friend to urge him to pursue her. Oswalt did so, and they began dating shortly afterwards. They married on September 24, 2005. In April 2009 she gave birth to their daughter, Alice. At age nine, Alice made her voiceover debut on the TV series My Little Pony: Friendship Is Magic, as Wind Sprint, which saw Alice working alongside her father, who voices the character of Quibble Pants, and Alice's stepmother, Meredith Salenger, who plays Clear Sky.

== Death ==
On April 21, 2016, McNamara died in her sleep at her family's Los Angeles home, at the age of 46. According to the autopsy report released online by Radar, her death was due to the effects of multiple prescription drugs including Adderall and Xanax. According to the Radar article, several of the medications were not prescribed to her, and other drugs such as cocaine and levamisole and fentanyl were also found in her possession. Previously undiagnosed atherosclerosis and stenosis of coronary arteries was a contributing factor but not related to the immediate cause, and the coroner ruled her death an accidental overdose of the combined prescription and illegal drugs. In June 2020, Oswalt and I'll be Gone in the Dark director Liz Garbus acknowledged that McNamara had been addicted to opioids.

== Selected works ==
Magazine articles:

- McNamara, Michelle (February 27, 2013). "In the Footsteps of a Killer". Los Angeles.
- McNamara, Michelle (February 27, 2013). "Hear the Golden State Killer" (includes audio). Los Angeles.
- McNamara, Michelle (February 27, 2013). "The Five Most Popular Myths About the Golden State Killer Case". Los Angeles.
- McNamara, Michelle (February 27, 2013). "The Evidence Locker: Inside the Case of The Golden State Killer". Los Angeles.
- McNamara, Michelle (March 7, 2013). "Update: In the Footsteps of a Killer". Los Angeles.
- McNamara, Michelle (March 25, 2013). "New Evidence: Investigators Release a Third Recording Believed to Be of the Golden State Killer's Voice - NSFW". Los Angeles.
- McNamara, Michelle (April 15, 2013). "Golden State Killer Update: One Victim's Family Responds to Our Coverage of the Cold Case". Los Angeles.
- McNamara, Michelle (June 4, 2013). "Sleuthing with Science: A Q&A with Forensic Genealogist Colleen Fitzpatrick". Los Angeles.
- McNamara, Michelle (June 28, 2013). "Killer Mystery: Is Charles Manson Responsible For More Murders?". Los Angeles.
- McNamara, Michelle (July 1, 2013). "Why Charles Manson Won't Die". Los Angeles.
- McNamara, Michelle (July 8, 2013). "Who Murdered UCLA Medical Center Nurse Melanie Howell?". Los Angeles.
- McNamara, Michelle (July 10, 2013). "Dead Men Talking: The Program Keeping Serial Criminals from Taking Intel on Unsolved Cases to their Graves". Los Angeles.
- McNamara, Michelle (September 9, 2013). "Update: Investigators Have a New Lead on the Golden State Killer". Los Angeles.
- McNamara, Michelle (January 22, 2014). "Update: Was The Golden State Killer a Cowboy?". Los Angeles.

Book:

- McNamara, Michelle; Haynes, Paul (completion); Jensen, Billy (completion) (2018). I'll Be Gone in the Dark: One Woman's Obsessive Search for the Golden State Killer. New York: HarperCollins. ISBN 978-0-0623-1980-7. OCLC 1023574441.
