= Hunting a Psychopath =

Book by Richard Shelby

- First edition
- Author: Richard Shelby
- Language: English
- Genre: True crime
- Published: September 15, 2014
- Publisher: booklocker.com
- Publication place: United States

Hunting a Psychopath: The East Area Rapist/Original Night Stalker Investigation – The Original Investigator Speaks Out is a nonfiction book by retired detective Richard Shelby. It chronicles Richard Shelby's investigation of the Original Night Stalker as he remembers it. It was originally published on September 15, 2014.

== Background ==
Based on the serial rapist and killer, the Original Night Stalker also known as The East Area Rapist, Richard Shelby begins the story in the early 1970s of Visalia, California. As he progresses through the investigation, he recalls crimes throughout California that span the years of 1974 to 1986.

== Contents ==
The book contains 69 chapters, however, there are 9 sections that are not counted as chapters in the book. These chapters are full of details of most of the crimes the Original Night Stalker committed, Shelby's opinions, and composites from law enforcement.

== See also ==
- Sudden Terror, another book on the Original Night Stalker.
