= Laura Bliss =

American journalist and writer who founded MapLab

Laura Bliss is an American journalist and writer who founded MapLab. She is also known for her work with Bloomberg and her book, The Quarantine Atlas.

== Early life and education ==
Born in Los Angeles, California, Bliss earned a Bachelor of Arts in English and French from Wesleyan University. In 2023, Bliss was a fellow at the Knight Science Journalism Program at the Massachusetts Institute of Technology (MIT).

== Career ==
In 2017, Bliss founded MapLab, a Bloomberg Media newsletter focused on maps and geography.

During the COVID-19 pandemic, Bliss authored The Quarantine Atlas, published by Hachette. The book was based on her Bloomberg Media series that invited readers to submit hand-drawn maps and included essays depicting pandemic life worldwide. The Quarantine Atlas was described by Slate as a "visual archive."

In 2022, Bliss became the host of Bedrock, USA, a Bloomberg Media and iHeart Radio podcast that examines extremism in local politics.

Bliss has written articles for publications such as The Atlantic, Bloomberg Businessweek, Los Angeles Magazine, MIT Technology Review, Mother Jones, and The New York Times.

== Bibliography ==
- The Quarantine Atlas

== Awards and recognition ==
In 2025, Bliss was named a winner of the Society of Professional Journalists (SPJ) Northern California chapter’s Excellence in Journalism Awards for her Bloomberg Businessweek feature, "Parks and Degradation: The Mess at Yosemite."

In 2024, Bliss was a finalist for the Pulitzer Prize in Explanatory Writing. Later, she was nominated for the Harvard Kennedy School's Goldsmith Prize for Investigative Reporting for her article, "The Private Equity Firm Tapping America's Spring Water," part of Bloomberg Businessweek's Water Grab series on water privatization. The series received the 2023 Best in Business Honor from Arizona State University's Society for Advancing Business Editing and Writing.
