= I'll Be Gone in the Dark =

2018 true crime book by Michelle McNamara

I'll Be Gone in the Dark: One Woman's Obsessive Search for the Golden State Killer
- First edition cover
- Author: Michelle McNamara
- Language: English
- Genre: Non-fiction true crime
- Publisher: HarperCollins
- Publication date: February 27, 2018
- Publication place: United States
- Media type: Book
- Pages: 352
- ISBN: 978-0-06-231978-4
- OCLC: 988857242
- Dewey Decimal: 364.152/3209794
- LC Class: HV6565.C2 M36 2018

I'll Be Gone in the Dark: One Woman's Obsessive Search for the Golden State Killer is a true crime book by the American writer Michelle McNamara about the investigation of the Golden State Killer. The book was released on February 27, 2018, nearly two years after McNamara's death and two months before Joseph James DeAngelo was arrested in the case. In 2020, DeAngelo pled guilty to multiple charges, and was sentenced to life in prison with no chance of parole.

The book's title is a reference to a threat spoken by DeAngelo during his 1976 attack upon Kris Pedretti, his tenth known victim, then aged 15. She recalled his statement as: "Do what I say or I'll kill you and be gone in the dark".

== Development ==
After becoming interested in the crimes of what was then known as the "East Area Rapist" (among other names) McNamara wrote a 2013 Los Angeles magazine article about the serial killer, and ultimately signed a book deal with HarperCollins to write about the case.

McNamara is credited with coining the moniker Golden State Killer to refer to the criminal who had previously been referred to by various other names including the East Area Rapist, Original Night Stalker, Visalia Ransacker, East Bay Rapist, and Diamond Knot Killer. McNamara's coining of the Golden State Killer moniker is credited with heightening awareness of the then-unidentified serial killer who operated throughout California in the early 1970s to mid-1980s.

McNamara died in her sleep on April 21, 2016, at the age of 46 due to an accidental prescription drug overdose in conjunction with undiagnosed atherosclerosis. It was later disclosed she suffered with opioid addiction. Her book was about two-thirds completed at her death. The book was completed after McNamara's death by crime writer Paul Holes, investigative journalist Bill Jensen, and McNamara's widower, comedian Patton Oswalt. Jensen later explained that, while McNamara had completed numerous chapters for the book, they were not in any particular order in her computer files; consequently, he, Holes, and Oswalt mainly focused on sequencing her material and filling in gaps from her voluminous notes and copies of police documents.

The book was McNamara's debut and was released on February 27, 2018, and immediately went to the top of The New York Times Best Seller list for non-fiction. The book remained on the list for 15 weeks.

I'll Be Gone in the Dark contains an introduction by the American writer Gillian Flynn and an afterword by Oswalt.

== Impact ==
On April 25, 2018, the Sacramento Sheriff announced the April 24 arrest of a suspect in the Golden State Killer case: 72-year-old Joseph James DeAngelo (born November 8, 1945). DeAngelo, a former police officer in Auburn and Exeter, California, was arrested and charged with six counts of first-degree murder. Authorities in Sacramento, Orange, Santa Barbara, and Ventura counties prepared charges against DeAngelo for all 12 of the murders in the Golden State Killer case. The sheriff credited McNamara's dedication to the Golden State Killer case for raising publicity, but added that her work did not directly generate any critical tips or information that led to DeAngelo's arrest.

The book and McNamara's work on the case are frequently discussed in the true crime podcast My Favorite Murder, which boasts a large fan base of true crime aficionados. The debut episode of the show, "Episode 1: My Firstest Murder," featured the case as well as a discussion of McNamara's work. Prior to the arrest, "Episode 115: I'll Be Gone in the Dark at Skylight Books" featured Oswalt and Jensen discussing the book and their roles in finishing the project following McNamara's death. In that episode Oswalt discussed McNamara's writing process, including making "era-appropriate playlists to help her get into a proper mindset". Oswalt described the finishing of the book as a bittersweet experience: "It's another part of her that's kind of gone. In a very sick way, not having the book done—and us working on it—meant she was still here."

Jensen appeared on the My Favorite Murder episode "Golden State Serial Killer Caught", on April 26, 2018, immediately after the arrest was made, and discussed the case and his work on the book following McNamara's death. The episode "Surprise! It's Paul Holes" also featured Jensen and Holes discussing the case and the impact of McNamara's work.

== Adaptation ==
In April 2018, HBO announced they had purchased the rights for I'll Be Gone in the Dark and were developing it into a documentary series. Filming for the series began April 24, 2018, directed in part by Academy Award-nominee and Emmy-winner Liz Garbus. The documentary premiered June 28, 2020.

== See also ==
- 2018 in literature
