= Give Me the Ball! =

2026 American documentary film

- Directed by: Liz Garbus; Elizabeth Wolff
- Produced by: Liz Garbus; Elizabeth Wolff; Dominic Crossley-Holland; Dan Cogan; Chris James; Gentry Kirby; Helen Russell; Andrew Mayz
- Starring: Billie Jean King
- Cinematography: Tony Hardmon; Thorsten Thielow
- Edited by: Joshua L Pearson
- Music by: Laura Karpman
- Release dates: January 26, 2026 (Sundance); November 22, 2026 (ESPN)
- Running time: 101 minutes
- Country: United States
- Language: English

Give Me the Ball! is a 2026 American documentary film directed by Liz Garbus and Elizabeth Wolff. The film is an intimate portrait of tennis champion and social activist Billie Jean King, examining her impact on sports and culture through archival footage and candid interviews. The film is an ESPN Films 30 for 30 documentary produced by Ridley Scott Associates and Story Syndicate, in association with Elton John's Rocket Sports. It premiered at the Sundance Film Festival on January 26, 2026, and will air on ESPN on November 22, 2026.

== Premise ==
The documentary uses rare archival material and interviews with King and those closest to her to trace her impact on sports and culture. With a particular focus on 1973—a pivotal year when King was at the apex of both her tennis career and the women's movement—the film reveals the personal cost of her fight for equity and how she prioritized changing the world over her own wellbeing.

== Production ==
The documentary is produced by Garbus and Wolff's Story Syndicate, Ridley Scott Associates, and Rocket Sports, which was co-founded by Elton John. It is an ESPN Films 30 for 30 documentary, with a television premiere date to be announced.

Speaking about the project, Garbus stated: "We need heroes. We need people who have fought the hard fights and who have come through the other side, who have made sacrifice but feel enormous pride in that sacrifice."

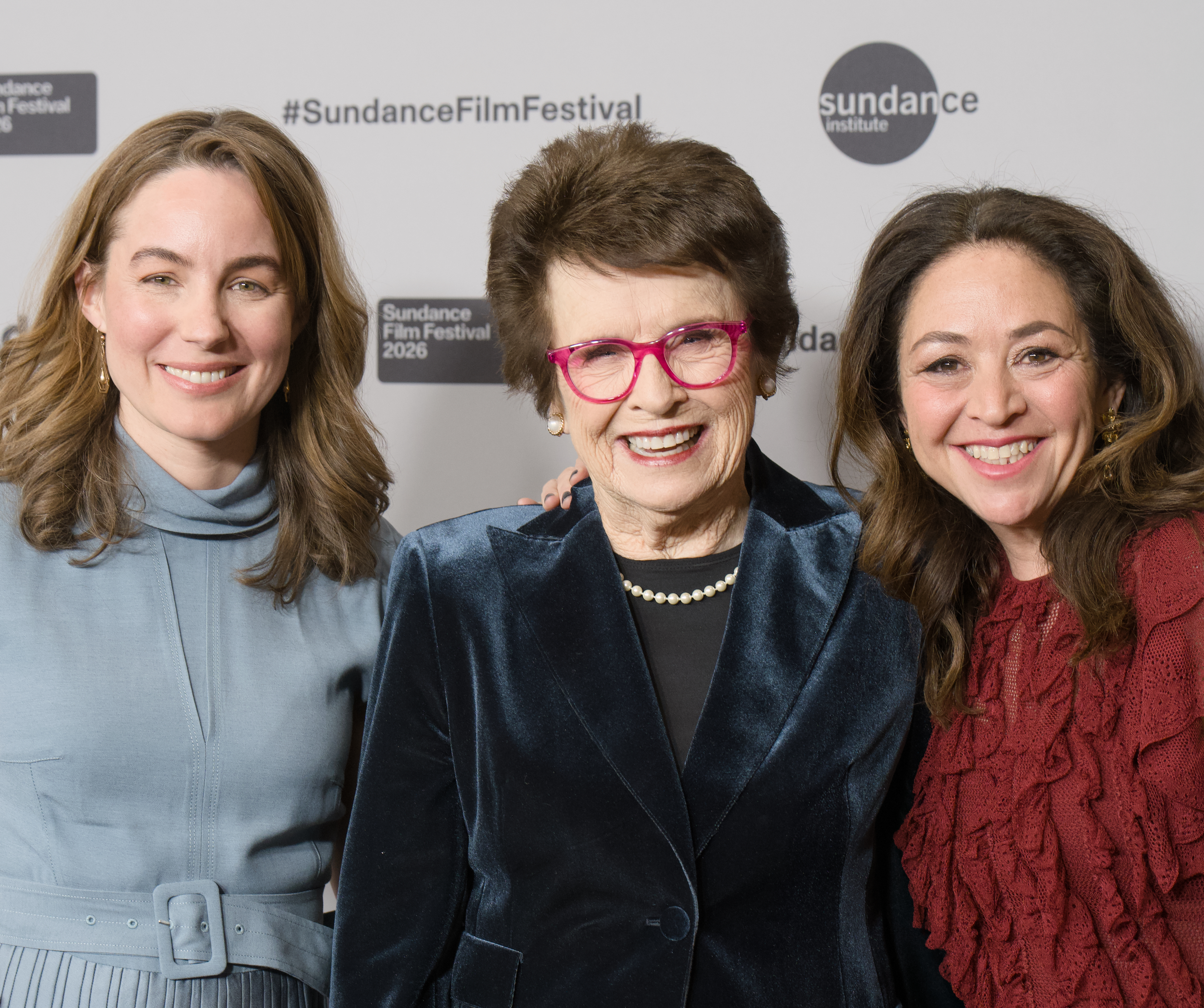
Wolff, King, and Garbus at the premiere of Give Me the Ball! in 2026

== Release ==
Give Me the Ball! premiered at the Sundance Film Festival in January 2026. The festival listing states the film was available in person only. The film will release on ESPN at 8:30pm ET on November 22, 2026. The film will also receive a limited theatrical release.

== Reception ==
On the review aggregator website Rotten Tomatoes, 100% of 14 critics' reviews are positive, with an average rating of 8.3/10. Metacritic, which uses a weighted average, assigned the film a score of 86 out of 100, based on seven critics, indicating "universal acclaim".

David Rooney of The Hollywood Reporter wrote, "King makes for a wonderful documentary subject, inspiring even for folks not particularly invested in sports, and this buoyant, massively entertaining and masterfully assembled film is exactly the glowing tribute she deserves."

== See also ==
- Battle of the Sexes (2017 film)
