= Elizabeth Wolff =

American documentary film director and producer (born 1984)

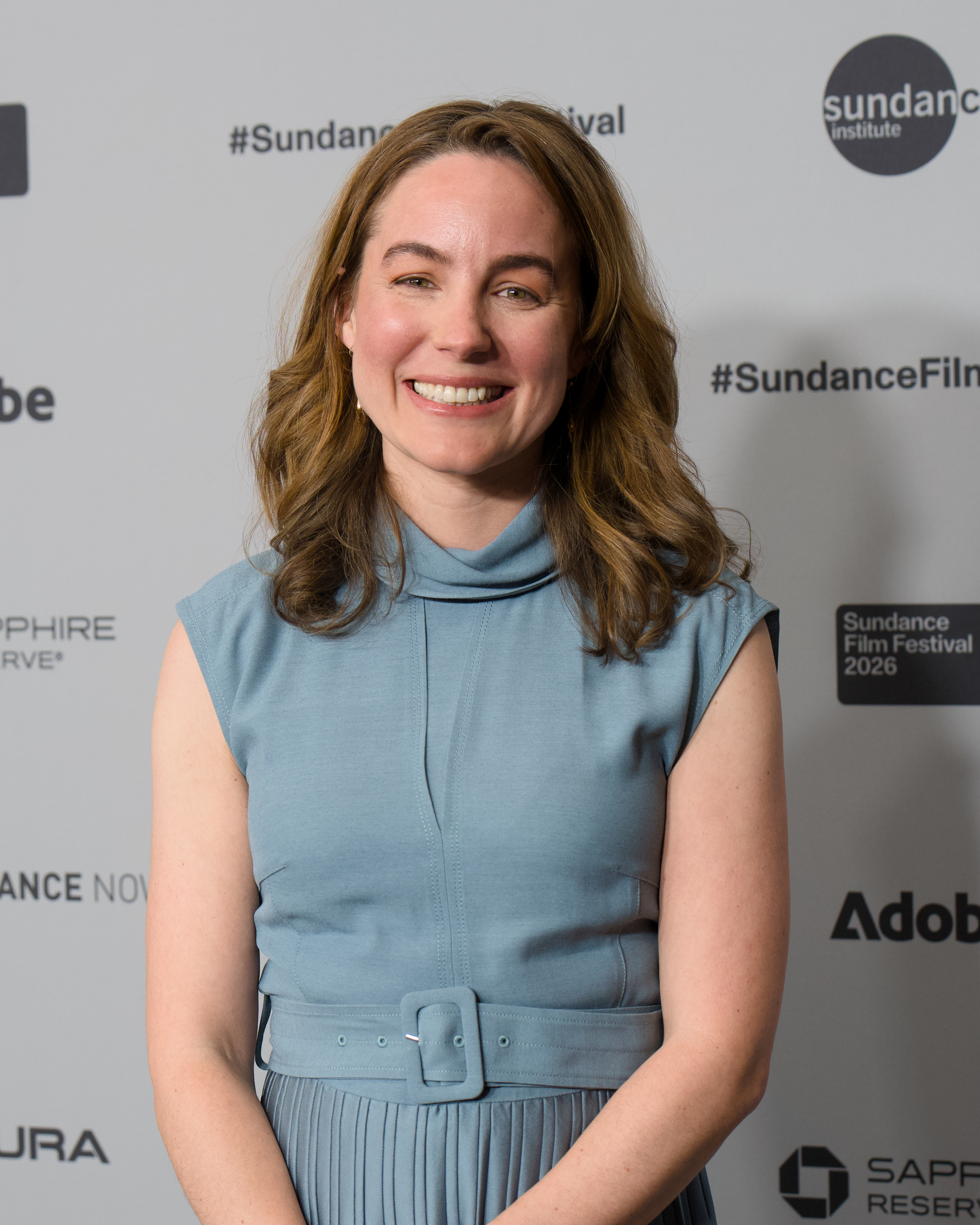
- Wolff in 2026
- Born: Elizabeth Anthoine Wolff; January 9, 1984 (age 42)
- Education: Wesleyan University
- Occupation: Documentary filmmaker
- Website: Official website

Elizabeth Anthoine Wolff (born January 9, 1984) is an American documentary film director and producer. Her work includes Bobby Kennedy for President (2018), I'll Be Gone in the Dark (2020), Gone Girls: The Long Island Serial Killer (2023), and Give Me the Ball! (2025).

== Early life and education ==
Wolff grew up in New York City. She is the daughter of writer Michael Wolff and lawyer Alison Anthoine. She is a graduate of The Brearley School and majored in history and English at Wesleyan University. Wolff's sister is Susanna Wolff, a TV writer and a "Shouts & Murmurs" contributor at The New Yorker.

== Career ==
Wolff began her career as a reporter for the New York Post and a freelance journalist for New York magazine. In 2014, Wolff created and produced Dark Horse Nation, a TV show for The History Channel about Dark Horse Brewery. In 2018, she produced Bobby Kennedy for President for Netflix. In 2020, she produced the HBO series I'll Be Gone in the Dark and directed three of the series' seven episodes alongside Liz Garbus.

In 2023, Wolff produced Gone Girls: The Long Island Serial Killer for Netflix, directed by Liz Garbus. In 2023, Wolff was named one of Doc NYC's 40 Under 40 of up and coming documentary filmmakers. In 2025, Wolff directed and produced her first feature-length documentary, Give Me the Ball!, an ESPN 30 for 30 production about world champion tennis player and social activist Billie Jean King, produced by Ridley Scott Associates and Story Syndicate, in association with Elton John's Rocket Sports. The film premiered in January 2026 at the Eccles Theater at the Sundance Film Festival.

== Filmography ==
Year	Film/Series	Director	Producer	Network/Streamer/Distributor
2011	Rocco's Dinner Party	No	Yes	Bravo (American TV network)
2013	Restaurant Divided	No	Yes	Food Network
2014	Dark Horse Nation	No	Executive	History Channel
2016	American Idol	No	Yes	American Broadcasting Company
2017	The Gospel According to André	No	Consulting	Magnolia Pictures
2018	Bobby Kennedy for President	No	Yes	Netflix
2018	Mars (TV series)	No	Yes	History Channel
2020	I'll Be Gone in the Dark (TV series)	Yes	Yes	HBO
2021	Among the Stars	No	Yes	Disney
2024	Churchill at War	No	Yes	Netflix
2025	Gone Girls: The Long Island Serial Killer	No	Co-executive	Netflix
2026	Give Me the Ball!	Yes	Yes	Disney

== Selected honors and awards ==
- DOC NYC 40-Under-40 Class of 2023
