= Paul Holes =

American former cold-case investigator

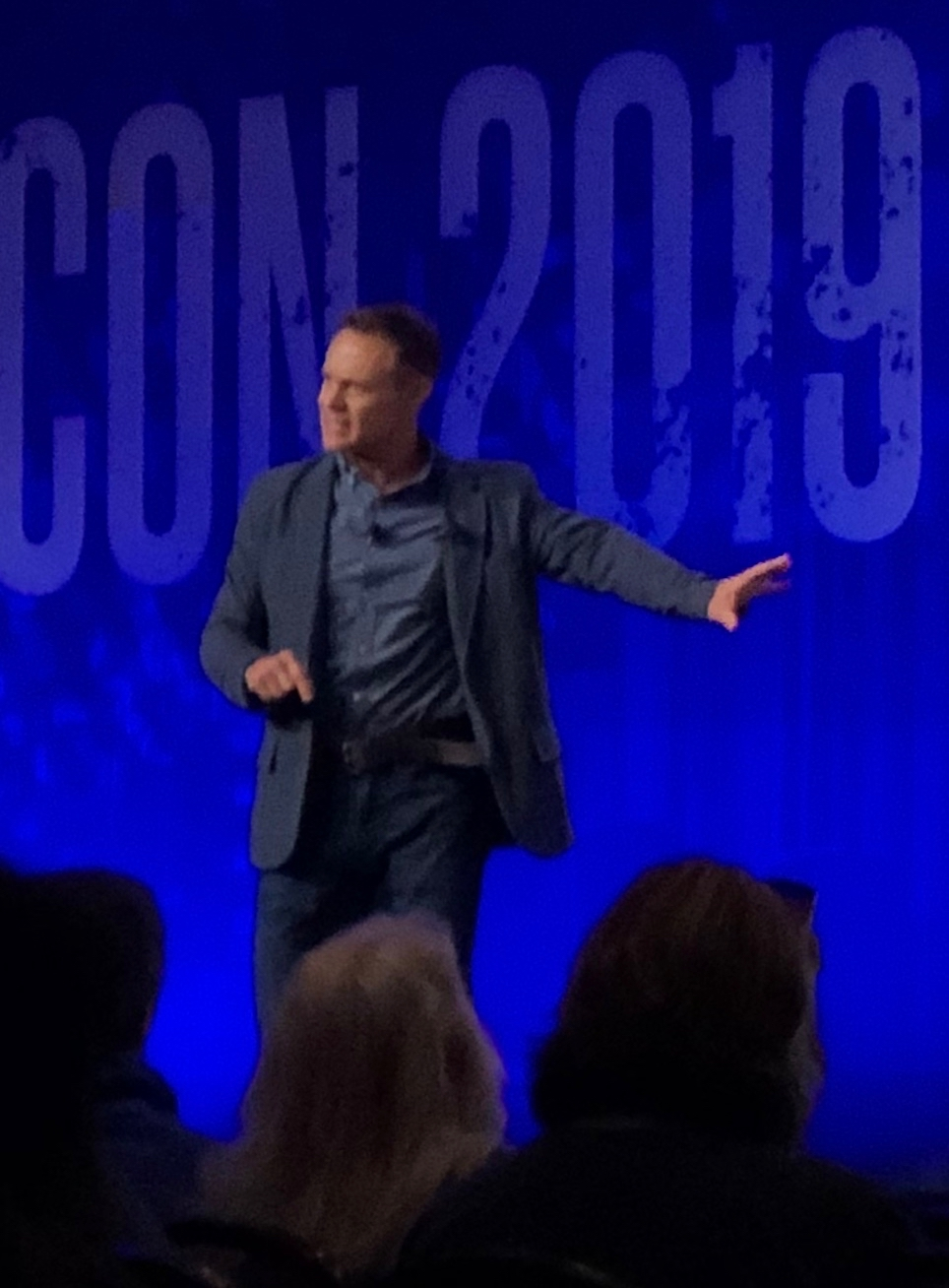
- Holes in 2019
- Born: March 15, 1968 (age 58); MacDill AFB, Florida, U.S.
- Occupations: Cold-case investigator, sheriff, writer, podcaster
- Years active: 1994–Present

Paul Holes (born March 15, 1968) is an American former cold-case investigator for the Contra Costa County Sheriff's Office. Holes is known for his contributions to solving the Golden State Killer case using advanced methods of identifying the killer with DNA and genealogy technology. Since retiring in March 2018, Holes has contributed to books, television, and podcasts about the Golden State Killer and true crime.

== Early life ==
Holes was born to devoutly Catholic parents. His family moved several times in his childhood due to his father working in the United States Air Force. He studied at the University of California, Davis, from 1986 to 1990. There he received his Bachelor of Science in biochemistry. His interest in scientific investigation of crimes was sparked during childhood by the television series Quincy, M.E. (1976-1983).

== Career ==
=== Investigative work ===
Holes was sworn in as an investigator for the Contra Costa County Sheriff's Office in Martinez, California, in 1994. In the same year, Holes first discovered the cold case files of the East Area Rapist (EAR). His interest in the case was ignited and he remained close to the files, reviewing them any chance he had between active cases in Contra Costa County until a DNA break in 2001 expanded the case even further. When DNA from the EAR matched a string of unsolved California murders committed by a killer dubbed the "Original Night Stalker" (ONS) the case again gained traction. Holes struck up a friendship with journalist Michelle McNamara, who coined the term Golden State Killer (GSK) to publicize the connection between the EAR-ONS cases.

In the meantime, Holes helped investigate dozens of cases including those of convicted murderers Philip Joseph Hughes Jr. and Roger Kibbe, and looking into if Phillip Garrido was connected to other unsolved crimes after he was identified as the kidnapper of Jaycee Dugard.

After years of gathering evidence for the GSK cases and using as many DNA samples as he could without depleting the evidence, Holes made contact with genealogist and scientist Barbara Rae-Venter. Rae-Venter used DNA from the GSK cases to construct a genetic profile of the suspect and create a family tree that was detailed enough to narrow down the suspects to Joseph James DeAngelo.

In March 2018, Holes visited the Citrus Heights home of DeAngelo on his final day as an investigator before his retirement. Holes watched the home for the activity of DeAngelo, who at the time was only a leading suspect tied to the Golden State Killer rapes and murders. Holes decided not to approach the home for fear of causing a disturbance or tipping off DeAngelo of any suspicion of his involvement as a suspect in the case. Using discarded DNA samples from DeAngelo's home, detectives were able to match his DNA to that known to be from the Golden State Killer. DeAngelo was later taken into custody by the Sacramento Police on April 24, 2018.

While researching the EAR case, some investigators began to suspect that another high profile unsolved case, the Visalia Ransacker, and the EAR were the same person based on evidence similarity. However, unlike the Golden State Killer case, no current DNA link existed. In a 2017 interview, Holes was skeptical of the link between the two, based on credible witness descriptions, but changed his mind after the DeAngelo arrest.

=== Podcasts ===
In 2019, Holes and investigative journalist Billy Jensen released a true crime podcast called The Murder Squad that explored evidence and discussions of unsolved murders, unidentified remains, and missing persons cases. The weekly podcast was a production of Exactly Right, a podcast network created by Karen Kilgariff and Georgia Hardstark, hosts of My Favorite Murder. The podcast was cancelled by the network in May 2022.

In September 2022, Holes and journalist Kate Winkler Dawson started the true crime podcast Buried Bones on the Exactly Right Network.

== Personal life ==
Holes has been married twice. His first marriage was to a high school girlfriend, which resulted in two children. The couple divorced due, in part, to religious differences and Holes's admitted obsessive focus on his career. Holes's second wife was also a criminal investigator, and they had two children.

== In the media ==
Holes came to the public's attention through his investigation of the Golden State Killer with Michelle McNamara, who coined that nickname Golden State Killer, and through his appearances on the My Favorite Murder podcast.

Holes has been published and featured in many media outlets in discussion with the Golden State Killer leading up to and following DeAngelo's arrest.

2000

- Cold Case Files: Season 2, episode 22

2009

- MysteryQuest: Season 1, episode 3
- THS Investigates: The Original Night Stalker

2016

- Crime Watch Daily: Season 2, episode 52

2017

- 48 Hours: Season 30, episode 34
- 48 Hours on ID: Season 8, episode 20
- On the Case with Paula Zahn: Season 15, episode 3
- Casefile True Crime Podcast: Case 53: EAR/ONS; Bonus episode #2: Interview with Paul Holes

2018

- The Golden State Killer: It's Not Over: Season 1, episodes 1–4
- Evil Has a Name: The Untold Story of the Golden State Killer Investigation: audiobook writer, narrator

2018-2019

- Unmasking a Killer: Season 1, episodes 1–7

2019-2020

- The DNA of Murder with Paul Holes

2020

- I'll Be Gone In The Dark

2021

- The Riddle of Emmon Bodfish: audiobook writer, narrator
- A Devil in the Valley: audiobook writer, narrator

2022

- Unmasked: My Life Solving America's Cold Cases: memoir

2023

- Real Life Nightmare, Season 4
