= Joseph James DeAngelo =

American serial rapist and serial killer (born 1945)

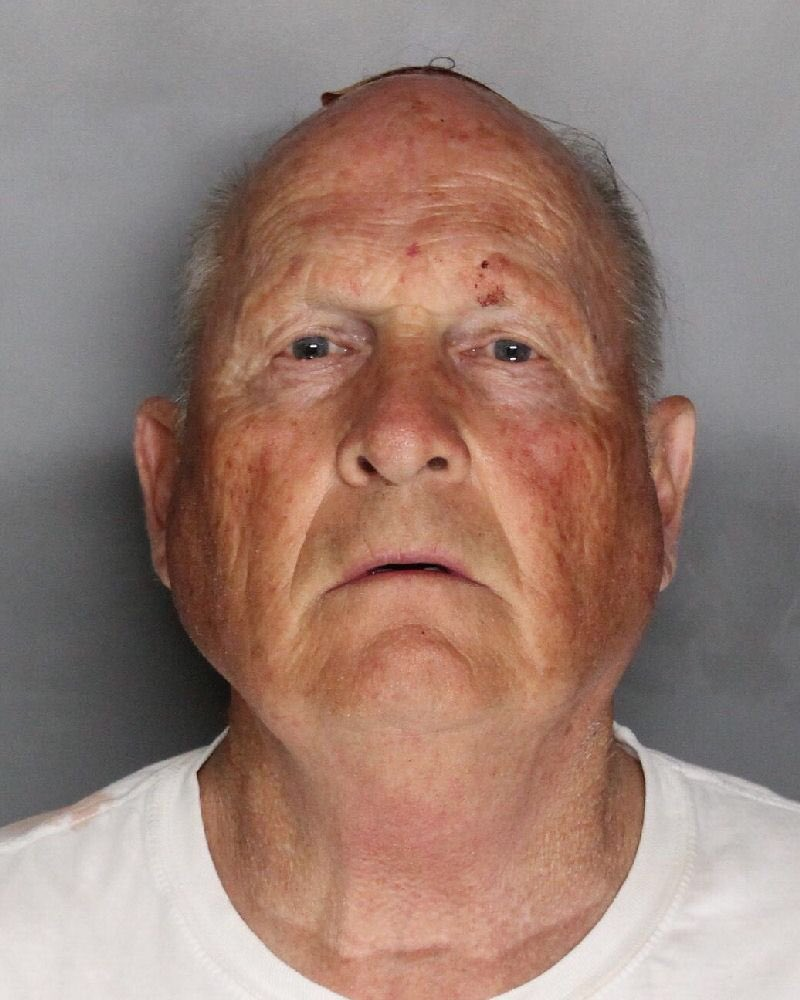
- Mug shot of DeAngelo in 2018
- Born: Joseph James DeAngelo Jr. November 8, 1945 (age 81); Bath, New York, U.S.
- Other names: Visalia Ransacker; East Area Rapist; East Side Rapist; East Bay Rapist; Creek Bed Killer; Diamond Knot Killer; Original Night Stalker; EARONS; Golden State Killer
- Occupations: Police officer (1973–1979); Mechanic
- Height: 5 ft 10 in (1.78 m)
- Spouse: Sharon Huddle (m. 1973; div. 2019)
- Children: 3
- Status: Incarcerated at California State Prison, Corcoran
- Convictions: First-degree murder with special circumstances (13 counts); Kidnapping (13 counts)
- Penalty: 13 consecutive life sentences without the possibility of parole plus 8 years

Details
- Victims: 13 murdered; 51+ raped; 220+ burglarized (120+ as Visalia Ransacker, 100+ as East Area Rapist)
- Span of crimes: 1974–1986
- Country: United States
- State: California
- Weapons: Various weapons, including a Miroku revolver
- Date apprehended: April 24, 2018

Joseph James DeAngelo Jr. (born November 8, 1945) is an American serial killer, serial rapist, and former police officer known as the Golden State Killer, the Original Night Stalker, the East Area Rapist, and the Visalia Ransacker, who committed thirteen murders and numerous rapes and burglaries across California between 1974 and 1986. DeAngelo's crimes began in Northern California, where he committed a minimum of 120 burglaries and one murder in the San Joaquin Valley, before moving to Sacramento County, where he committed at least 51 rapes and two more murders from 1976 to 1979. In Southern California, DeAngelo murdered at least ten people from 1979 until 1986 before going dormant.

After committing a series of highly publicized burglaries in and around Visalia, DeAngelo escalated to raping victims in East Sacramento and was additionally linked to attacks in Stockton, Modesto, and Contra Costa County. He committed serial murders in Santa Barbara, Ventura, and Orange counties from 1979 to 1986. DeAngelo is believed to have taunted and threatened both victims and police via obscene phone calls and possibly written communications.

During the decades-long investigation, several suspects were cleared through DNA evidence, alibis or other investigative methods. In 2001, DNA testing indicated that the "East Area Rapist" and the "Original Night Stalker" were the same person, resulting in the combined acronym EARONS. The case was a factor in the establishment of California's DNA database, which collects DNA from all accused and convicted felons in California and has been called second only to Virginia's in effectiveness in solving cold cases. In an attempt to increase awareness, crime writer Michelle McNamara coined the name "Golden State Killer" in the 2010s.

In 2016, the Federal Bureau of Investigation (FBI) and local law enforcement agencies held a news conference to announce a renewed nationwide effort, offering a $50,000 reward for the Golden State Killer's capture. On April 24, 2018, California authorities charged 72-year-old DeAngelo with eight counts of first-degree murder on the basis of DNA evidence; investigators had identified members of DeAngelo's family through forensic genetic genealogy. This was also the first announcement connecting the Visalia Ransacker crimes to DeAngelo.

Owing to California's statute of limitations on pre-2017 rape cases, DeAngelo could not be charged with the rapes he had committed in the 1970s; but he was charged in August 2018 with thirteen related kidnapping and abduction attempts. On June 29, 2020, DeAngelo pleaded guilty to multiple counts of murder and kidnapping. As part of a plea bargain that spared him the death penalty, DeAngelo also admitted to numerous crimes with which he had not been formally charged, including rapes. On August 21, 2020, DeAngelo was sentenced to life imprisonment without the possibility of parole.

== Personal life ==
=== Early life and education ===
Joseph James DeAngelo Jr. was born on November 8, 1945, in Bath, New York, to Kathleen "Kay" Louise DeGroat and Joseph James DeAngelo Sr, a sergeant in the United States Army. He was regularly beaten by both parents throughout his childhood. When he was a child, DeAngelo's family lived in West Germany where his father was stationed. There, DeAngelo was forced to witness the rape of one of his sisters by two airmen in a U.S. Air Force base warehouse.

Between 1959 and 1960, DeAngelo attended Mills Junior High School in Rancho Cordova, California. Beginning in 1961, he attended Folsom High School, from which he later received a GED certificate in 1964. He played on the school's junior varsity baseball team. According to prosecutors, DeAngelo committed burglaries, mail theft, and tortured and killed animals during his teenage years.

=== Military service and early training ===
DeAngelo joined the United States Navy in September 1964 and served for 22 months during the Vietnam War as a damage controlman aboard the cruiser USS Canberra and the destroyer tender USS Piedmont. Beginning in August 1968, he attended Sierra College in Rocklin, California; he graduated with an associate degree in police science with honors. He enrolled at Sacramento State University in 1971, earning a bachelor's degree in criminal justice. DeAngelo later took postgraduate courses and additional police training at the College of the Sequoias in Visalia, and completed a 32-week police internship with the Roseville Police Department.

=== Police officer ===
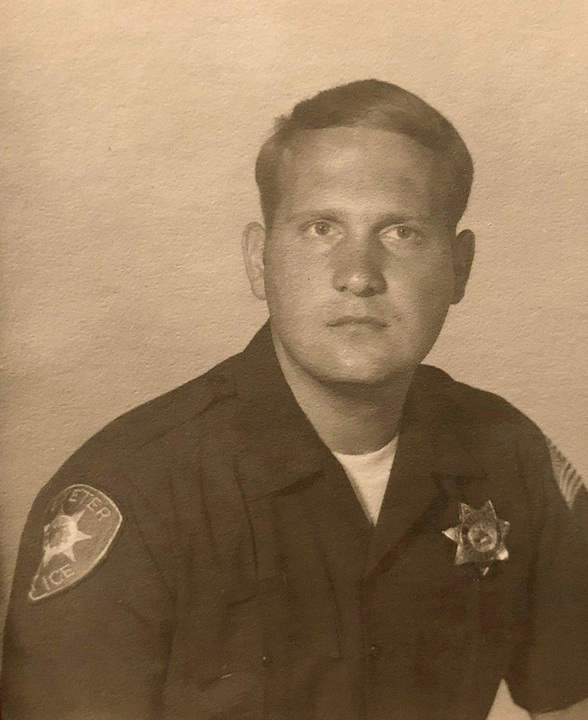
Photograph released by the Santa Barbara County Sheriff's Office showing DeAngelo, who joined the Exeter Police Department in 1973

From May 1973 to August 1976, DeAngelo served as a burglary-unit police officer in Exeter, having relocated from Citrus Heights. He assisted in the search for himself as the Visalia Ransacker. He then worked in Auburn from August 1976 to July 1979. Nick Willick, who would later become Chief of Police, stated he was an unremarkable officer. DeAngelo also had a habit of standing too close to other officers and citizens, which made people uneasy and was potentially dangerous for himself as someone could have grabbed his gun. When Willick pointed this out to him and when other officers gave him basic policing advice, DeAngelo did not handle the criticism well and sulked. In July 1979, he was arrested for shoplifting a hammer and dog repellent. During the arrest he defecated himself, feigned a heart attack and fought store security. When deputies arrived, he rolled around on the chair he was tied to feigning madness, before admitting it was an act. He received a six-month probation sentence and was fired that October.

During the termination process, DeAngelo allegedly stalked Chief Willick's home. Willick's daughter told Willick that a man had shone a flashlight into her room; however, he dismissed it. DeAngelo countered his termination by saying that Willick had harassed him, and bringing a work-related stress claim against the city. DeAngelo was required to see a therapist for his claim; he told the therapist that due to his distress he had gone to Willick's house intending to kill him, but was unable to locate Willick's window. Willick did not take this seriously, assuming it was a ploy by DeAngelo to boost his case for disability pay. Once DeAngelo was identified as a potential suspect on March 14, 2018, investigator Paul Holes contacted Willick, who told him this story; Holes realized then that DeAngelo was definitely the perpetrator they were looking for.

=== Marriage and relationships ===
In May 1970, DeAngelo became engaged to nursing student Bonnie Jean Colwell, a classmate at Sierra College. She ended the relationship in 1971 after he became manipulative and abusive, culminating in his demand she help him cheat on a test for a psychology class he was failing. After the breakup, he attempted to force her to marry him by threatening her with a gun.

In November 1973, he married future attorney Sharon Marie Huddle of Citrus Heights in a ceremony held in Auburn. In 1980, they purchased a house in Citrus Heights, where he would eventually be arrested decades afterward. The couple also bought a second home in Long Beach and lived there for much of the 1980s. They had three daughters and later separated.

In July 2018, several months after DeAngelo's arrest, Huddle filed for a divorce, which was finalized the following year. Neither she nor their children suspected he had committed serious crimes. His eldest daughter described him as a "perfect father", while his wife accepted his explanations for being away from home. He was living with a daughter and granddaughter at the time of his arrest.

=== Other employment ===
DeAngelo's employment during the 1980s is unclear; it is suspected that he worked as a computer engineer and as a cashier. From 1990 until his retirement in 2017, he worked as a truck mechanic at a Save Mart Supermarkets distribution center in Roseville. He was arrested in 1996 for failing to pay for gasoline, but the charge was dismissed.

=== Loud outbursts ===
DeAngelo's brother‑in‑law stated that DeAngelo would casually bring up the East Area Rapist in conversation around the time of the original crimes. Neighbors also reported that he frequently engaged in loud, profane outbursts. One neighbor said that his family received a phone message from DeAngelo threatening to "deliver a load of death" because of their barking dog.

== Crimes ==
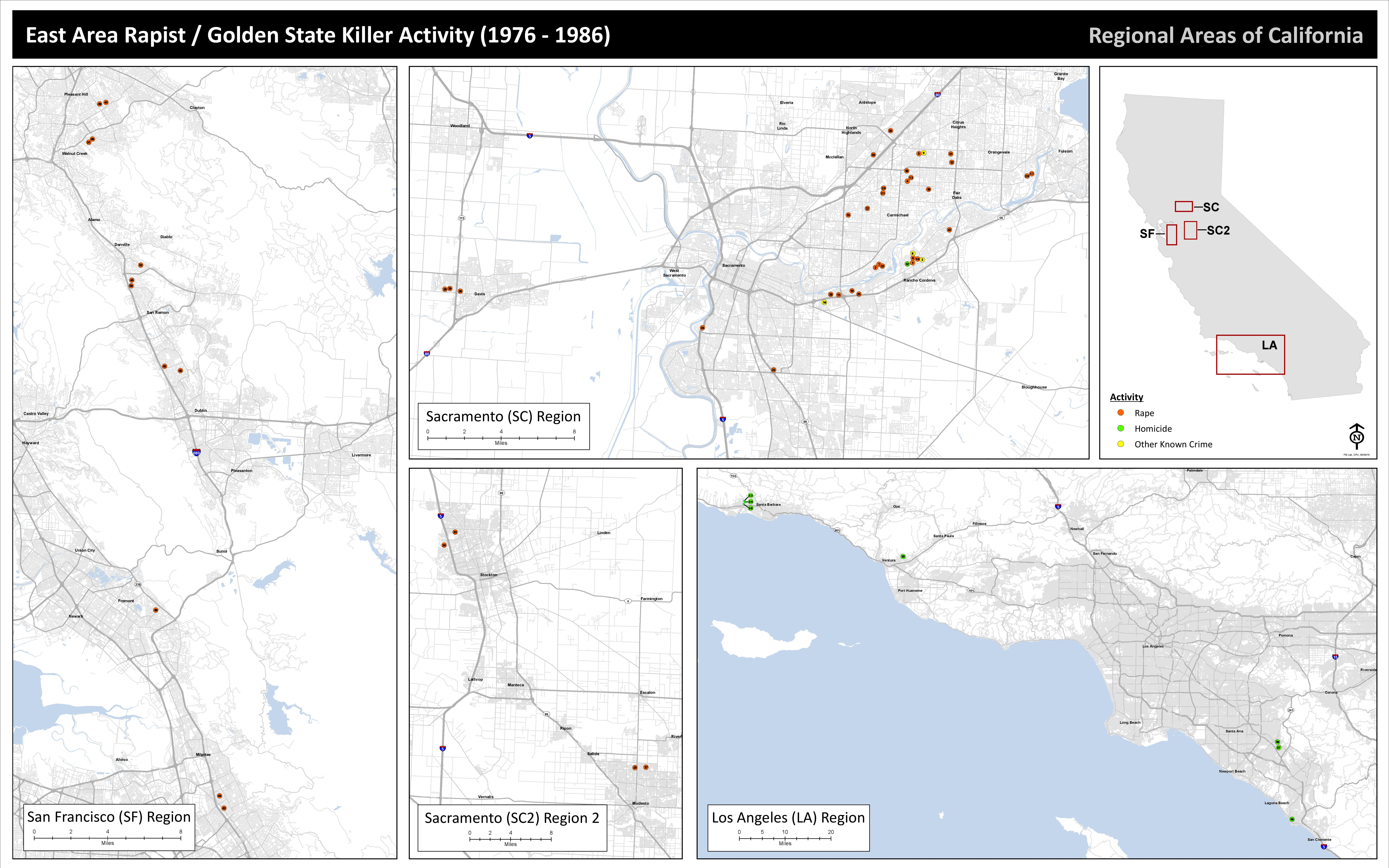
Map showing locations of attacks by region of the East Area Rapist in California

DNA evidence linked DeAngelo to eight murders in Goleta, Ventura, Dana Point, and Irvine; two other murders in Goleta, lacking DNA evidence, were linked by modus operandi. DeAngelo pleaded guilty to three other murders: two in Rancho Cordova and one in Visalia. He also committed more than 50 known rapes in the California counties of Sacramento, Contra Costa, Stanislaus, San Joaquin, Alameda, Santa Clara, and Yolo; and he was linked to hundreds of incidents of thefts, burglaries, vandalism, peeping, stalking, and prowling.

=== Visalia Ransacker (1974–1975) ===
It was long suspected that the East Area Rapist used the community of Visalia as a training ground for his earliest crimes. Earlier Visalia crimes dating back as early as May 1973 and other sprees like that of the "Cordova Cat Burglar", during which he killed several dogs by blunt force, and the "Exeter Ransacker", as well as Visalia burglaries that took place after the shooting of Detective William McGowen (see below under "Shootings"), are now suspected to be linked also. Over a period of 20 months, DeAngelo is believed to have been responsible for one murder and around 120 burglaries.

In late April 2018, the Visalia chief of police stated that while there was no DNA linking DeAngelo to the Central Valley cases, his department had other evidence that played a role in the investigation; and he was "confident that the Visalia Ransacker has been captured". Though the statutes of limitations for the burglaries have each expired, DeAngelo was formally charged on August 13, 2018, with the first degree murder of Claude Snelling in 1975. In 2020, DeAngelo pleaded guilty to the Snelling murder.

==== Burglaries ====
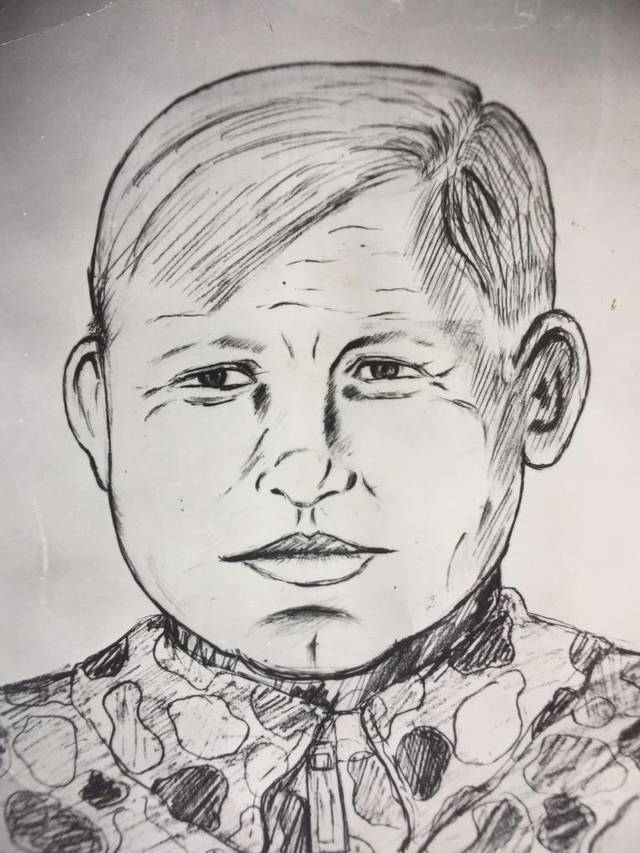
A composite sketch of the Visalia Ransacker

The first recorded ransacking occurred on March 19, 1974, when a sum of $50 in coins was stolen from a piggy bank. Most of the Ransacker's activities involved breaking into houses, rifling through or vandalizing the owner's possessions, scattering women's underclothes and stealing a range of low-value items while often ignoring banknotes and higher-valued items in plain sight. The Ransacker would also often arrange or display items in the house. Items emptied included piggy banks and coin jars; and stolen items often included Blue Chip Stamps, foreign or historic coins, and personal items (such as single earrings, cuff-links, rings, or medallions) but also included six weapons and various types of ammunition. There were 12 separate incidents on November 30, 1974. Common characteristics of the burglaries included:

- climbing fences and moving through established routes such as parks, walkways, ditches, and trails
- attempting to pry open multiple points of entry, particularly windows
- leaving multiple points of escape open, especially windows, as well as the house, garage, and garden doors
- moving removed window screens onto beds or into bedrooms
- placing "warning items" such as dishes or bottles against doors and on door handles
- wearing gloves (given the absence of fingerprint evidence)

==== Shootings ====
On September 11, 1975, DeAngelo broke into the home of Claude Snelling, 45. Snelling, a journalism professor at the College of the Sequoias, had previously chased a prowler discovered under his 16-year-old daughter's bedroom window around 10:00 p.m. on February 5, 1975. On September 11, he was awakened around 2:00 a.m. by strange noises. Upon leaving his bedroom, Snelling ran through the open back door and confronted a ski-masked intruder in his carport attempting to kidnap his daughter, who had been subdued with threats of being stabbed or shot. Snelling was then shot twice, staggered back into the house to his wife, and later died. After the shooting, the assailant punched and kicked the daughter, leaving her on the ground, and fled the scene. A stolen bicycle, linked to the assailant, was found nearby at 615 Redwood Street. After the murder, Beth Snelling, 16, underwent hypnosis in order to gather further details. The Visalia police also committed more resources to apprehending the Ransacker, and a $4,000 reward was posted. Nighttime stakeouts were set up near houses that he had previously prowled, but the ransackings continued.

Around 8:30 p.m. on December 12, 1975, a masked man entered the back yard of a house at 1505 W. Kaweah Avenue, near where the Ransacker had been reported to frequent. When Detective William McGowen (on stakeout inside the garage) attempted to detain the man, the suspect shrieked, removed his mask, and feigned surrender after McGowen fired a warning shot. However, after jumping the fence to the house at 1501, he pulled out a revolver with his left hand and fired once near McGowen's face, shattering his flashlight. Nearby officers rushed to aid McGowen, and the shooter was able to escape. Items collected as evidence included the flashlight, tennis shoe tracks, and dropped loot, namely Blue Chip Stamps and a sock full of coins. McGowen stated he had previously seen the perpetrator before, most likely since DeAngelo assisted in the search for the Visalia Ransacker as a sergeant.

=== East Area Rapist (1976–1979) ===
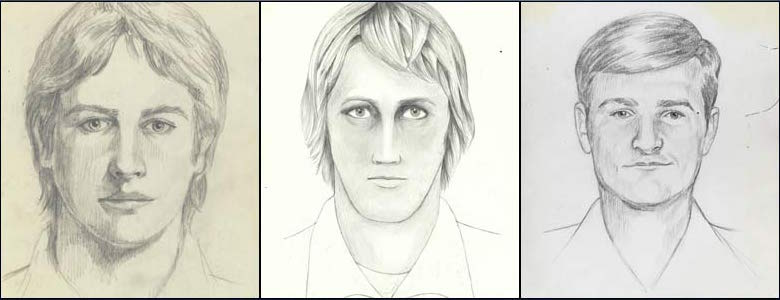
Three sketches on which the FBI focused when it reopened the case in June 2016

DeAngelo moved to the Sacramento area in 1976, where his crimes escalated from burglary to rape. The crimes initially centered on the then-unincorporated areas of Carmichael, Citrus Heights, and Rancho Cordova, east of Sacramento.

On December 18, 1976, DeAngelo entered into the home of his tenth victim, 15-year-old Kris Pedretti, who was home alone while her parents were at a Christmas party. At 6:00 pm, as she played the piano, DeAngelo, wearing a ski mask, put a knife to her throat and said to her, "Do what I say or I'll kill you and be gone in the dark," the phrase that would later serve as the title of Michelle McNamara's book on the case. For more than two hours, he raped her three times. According to Pedretti, "He alternated leaving me outside, naked in the winter cold, and bringing me in different rooms where he raped me." He ultimately left her on a couch in front of a fireplace, leaving her blindfolded, bound, and gagged, before leaving. She freed herself and called neighbors for help. Pedretti described the renewed humiliation that she felt when police asked her intimate questions that she was not equipped to answer as a 15-year-old, and again when a rape kit was administered. She referred to these interactions as the second and third victimizations that she endured that evening.

DeAngelo's initial modus operandi was to stalk middle-class neighborhoods at night in search of women who were alone in one-story homes, usually near a school, creek, trail or other open space that would provide a quick escape. He was seen a number of times but always successfully fled; on one occasion, he shot and seriously wounded a young pursuer.

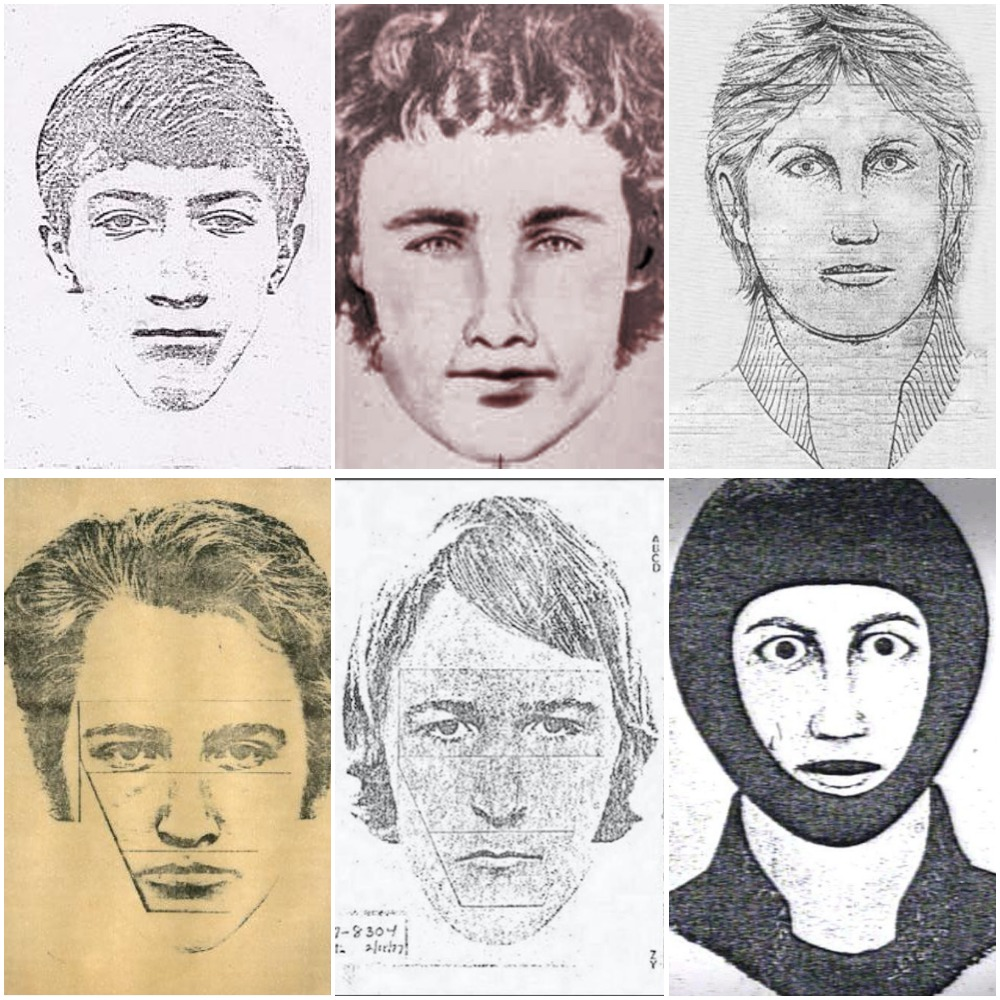
Various sketches of East Area Rapist

Most victims had seen or heard a prowler on their property before the attacks, and many had experienced break-ins. Police believed that the offender would conduct extensive reconnaissance in a targeted neighborhood—looking into windows and prowling in yards—before selecting a home to attack. It was believed that he sometimes entered the homes of future victims to unlock windows, unload guns, and plant ligatures for later use. He frequently telephoned future victims, sometimes for months in advance, to learn their daily routines.

Although DeAngelo originally targeted women alone in their homes or with children, he eventually preferred attacking couples. This change in modus operandi is believed to be a direct result of media reports claiming he only attacked women alone in the home. His usual method was to break in through a window or sliding glass door and awaken the sleeping occupants with a flashlight, threatening them with a handgun. Victims were subsequently bound with ligatures (often shoelaces) that he found or brought with him, then blindfolded and gagged with towels that he had ripped into strips. The female victim was usually forced to tie up her male companion before she was bound. The bindings were often so tight that the victims' hands were numb for hours after being untied. He then separated the couple, often stacking dishes on the man's back and threatening to kill everyone in the house if he heard them rattle. He would then move the woman to the living room and rape her repeatedly. A decade later, police reported that DeAngelo repeatedly said, "I hate you, Bonnie" (the name of his former fiancée) during a 1978 rape, the 37th attack. DeAngelo sometimes spent hours in the home ransacking closets and drawers, eating food in the kitchen, drinking beer, raping the woman again, or making additional threats. Victims sometimes thought he had left the house before he "jump[ed] from the darkness".

==== Attacks ====
#	Date	Time	Location	County	Ref.
1	Friday, June 18, 1976	4:00 a.m.	Rancho Cordova	Sacramento	
2	Monday, July 18, 1976	2:00 a.m.	Carmichael	Sacramento	
3	Sunday, August 30, 1976	3:20 a.m.	Rancho Cordova	Sacramento	
4	Saturday, September 4, 1976	11:30 p.m.	Carmichael	Sacramento	
5	Tuesday, October 5, 1976	6:45 a.m.	Citrus Heights	Sacramento	
6	Saturday, October 9, 1976	4:30 a.m.	Rancho Cordova	Sacramento	
7	Monday, October 18, 1976	2:30 a.m.	Carmichael	Sacramento	
8	Monday, October 18, 1976	11:00 p.m.	Rancho Cordova	Sacramento	
9	Wednesday, November 10, 1976	7:30 p.m.	Citrus Heights	Sacramento	
10	Saturday, December 18, 1976	7:00 p.m.	Carmichael	Sacramento	
11	Tuesday, January 18, 1977	11:00 p.m.	Sacramento	Sacramento	
12	Monday, January 24, 1977	12:00 a.m.	Citrus Heights	Sacramento	
13	Monday, February 7, 1977	6:45 a.m.	Carmichael	Sacramento	
14	Wednesday, February 16, 1977	10:30 p.m.	Sacramento	Sacramento	
15	Tuesday, March 8, 1977	4:00 a.m.	Arden-Arcade	Sacramento	
16	Friday, March 18, 1977	10:45 p.m.	Rancho Cordova	Sacramento	
17	Saturday, April 2, 1977	3:20 a.m.	Orangevale	Sacramento	
18	Friday, April 15, 1977	2:30 a.m.	Carmichael	Sacramento	
19	Tuesday, May 3, 1977	3:00 a.m.	Sacramento	Sacramento	
20	Thursday, May 5, 1977	2:40 a.m.	Orangevale	Sacramento	
21	Saturday, May 14, 1977	3:45 a.m.	Citrus Heights	Sacramento	
22	Tuesday, May 17, 1977	1:30 a.m.	Carmichael	Sacramento	
23	Saturday, May 28, 1977	1:00 a.m.	Parkway	Sacramento	
24	Tuesday, September 6, 1977	1:30 a.m.	Stockton	San Joaquin	
25	Saturday, October 1, 1977	1:30 a.m.	La Riviera	Sacramento	
26	Friday, October 21, 1977	3:00 a.m.	Foothill Farms	Sacramento	
27	Saturday, October 29, 1977	1:45 a.m.	Arden-Arcade	Sacramento	
28	Thursday, November 10, 1977	3:00 a.m.	Sacramento	Sacramento	
29	Friday, December 2, 1977	11:30 p.m.	Foothill Farms	Sacramento	
30	Saturday, January 28, 1978	10:15 p.m.	Carmichael	Sacramento	
31	Saturday, March 18, 1978	11:00 p.m.	Stockton	San Joaquin	
32	Friday, April 14, 1978	10:00 p.m.	Sacramento	Sacramento	
33	Monday, June 5, 1978	2:30 a.m.	Modesto	Stanislaus	
34	Wednesday, June 7, 1978	3:55 a.m.	Davis	Yolo	
35	Friday, June 23, 1978	1:30 a.m.	Modesto	Stanislaus	
36	Saturday, June 24, 1978	3:15 a.m.	Davis	Yolo	
37	Thursday, July 6, 1978	2:50 a.m.	Davis	Yolo	
38	Saturday, October 7, 1978	2:30 a.m.	Concord	Contra Costa	
39	Friday, October 13, 1978	4:30 a.m.	Concord	Contra Costa	
40	Saturday, October 28, 1978	4:30 a.m.	San Ramon	Contra Costa	
41	Saturday, November 4, 1978	3:30 a.m.	San Jose	Santa Clara	
42	Saturday, December 2, 1978	4:30 a.m.	San Jose	Santa Clara	
43	Saturday, December 9, 1978	2:00 a.m.	Danville	Contra Costa	
44	Monday, December 18, 1978	6:30 p.m.	San Ramon	Contra Costa	
45	Tuesday, March 20, 1979	5:00 a.m.	Rancho Cordova	Sacramento	
46	Wednesday, April 4, 1979	1:00 a.m.	Fremont	Alameda	
47	Saturday, June 2, 1979	11:30 p.m.	Walnut Creek	Contra Costa	
48	Monday, June 11, 1979	4:00 a.m.	Danville	Contra Costa	
49	Monday, June 25, 1979	4:00 a.m.	Walnut Creek	Contra Costa	
50	Thursday, July 5, 1979	3:45 a.m.	Danville	Contra Costa	

==== Maggiore murders ====
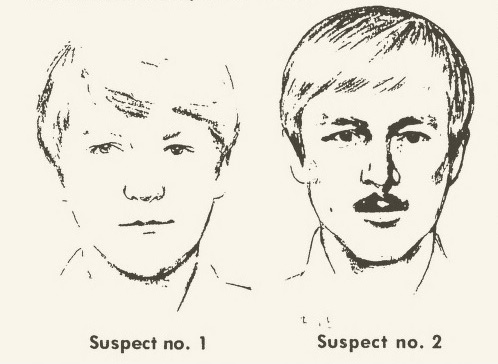
Sketches of two suspects in the Maggiore murders

A young Sacramento couple—21-year-old Brian Keith Maggiore, a military soldier at Mather Air Force Base, and his 20-year-old wife Katie Lee Maggiore—were walking their dog in the Rancho Cordova area on the night of February 2, 1978, near where five East Area Rapist attacks had occurred. The Maggiores fled after a confrontation in the street but were chased down and shot to death. Some investigators suspected that they had been murdered by the East Area Rapist because of their proximity to the other attacks' locations, and a shoelace was found nearby. The FBI announced on June 15, 2016, that it was confident that the East Area Rapist had murdered the Maggiores. On June 29, 2020, DeAngelo entered a plea of guilty to these murders.

=== Original Night Stalker (1979–1986) ===
Shortly after the rape committed on July 5, 1979, DeAngelo moved to Southern California and began killing his victims, first striking in Santa Barbara County in October. The attacks lasted until 1981, with a lone 1986 attack. Only the couple in the first attack survived, alerting neighbors and forcing the intruder to flee; the other victims were murdered by gunshot or bludgeoning. Since DeAngelo was not linked to these crimes for decades, he was known as the Night Stalker by Santa Barbara County investigators. The other murders in Ventura, Irvine and Dana Point were linked together through DNA evidence prior to 2000, and the assailant was renamed the Original Night Stalker after serial killer Richard Ramirez had been designated with the former nickname.

Crimes
#	Date	Victim(s)	Location	County
1	Monday, October 1, 1979	Unknown names (attempted murder; botched attack)	Queen Ann Lane, Goleta	Santa Barbara
2	Sunday, December 30, 1979	Robert Offerman and Debra Manning	Goleta	Santa Barbara
3	Thursday, March 13, 1980	Charlene and Lyman Smith	Ventura	Ventura
4	Tuesday, August 19, 1980	Keith and Patrice Harrington	Dana Point	Orange
5	Friday, February 6, 1981	Manuela Witthuhn	Irvine	Orange
6	Monday, July 27, 1981	Cheri Domingo and Gregory Sanchez	Goleta	Santa Barbara
7	Sunday, May 4, 1986	Janelle Cruz	Irvine	Orange

==== 1979 ====
On October 1, an intruder broke in and tied up a Goleta couple. Alarmed at hearing him say, "I'll kill 'em" to himself, the man and woman tried to escape when he left the room, and the woman screamed. Realizing that the alarm had been raised, the intruder fled on a bicycle. A neighbor (an FBI agent) responded to the noise and pursued the perpetrator, who abandoned the bicycle and a knife and escaped on foot through backyards.

On December 30, 44-year-old orthopedic surgeon Dr. Robert Offerman and 35-year-old clinical psychologist Dr. Debra Alexandria Manning were found shot to death in the bedroom of Offerman's condominium on Avenida Pequena in Goleta. Manning had also been raped. Two of her rings were found hidden between the mattress and bed frame near her body. Offerman's bindings were untied, indicating that he had lunged at the attacker. Neighbors had heard gunshots. Paw prints of a large dog were found at the scene, leading to speculation that the killer may have brought one with him. The dog was later determined stolen. The killer ate leftover Christmas turkey from Offerman's refrigerator, leaving the remnants in the kitchen. There was also evidence the killer had broken into the vacant adjoining condo and stolen a bicycle, later found abandoned on a street north of the scene, from a third residence in the complex.

==== 1980 ====
On March 13, 33-year-old interior designer Charlene Smith and 43-year-old attorney Lyman Smith were murdered in their Ventura home. Charlene had also been raped. A log from a woodpile on the side of the house was used to bludgeon the victims to death. They were discovered three days later by Lyman's 12-year-old son when he stopped by to mow the lawn. The bedroom alarm clock was still going off. Their wrists and ankles had been bound with drapery cord. An unusual Chinese knot, a diamond knot, was used on Charlene's wrists; the same knot was noted in the East Area Rapist attacks, at least one confirmed case of which was publicly known. The murderer was, therefore, briefly given the name Diamond Knot Killer.

On August 19, 24-year-old Keith Eli Harrington and 27-year-old Patrice Anne Harrington were found bludgeoned to death in their home on Cockleshell Drive in Dana Point's Niguel Shores gated community. Patrice Harrington had also been raped. She was bludgeoned so severely that her face and skull were pulverized. Although there was evidence that the Harringtons' wrists and ankles were bound, no murder weapon or ligatures were found at the scene. The Harringtons had been married for three months at the time of their deaths. Patrice was a pediatric nurse in Irvine, and Keith was a fourth year medical student at UC Irvine. He was on course to graduate early in December 1980. Keith's brother Bruce later spent nearly $2 million supporting California Proposition 69, authorizing DNA collection from all California felons and certain other criminals.

==== 1981 ====
On February 6, 28-year-old Manuela Witthuhn was raped and murdered in her Irvine home. Although Witthuhn's body had signs of being tied before she was bludgeoned, no murder weapon or ligatures were found. At the time of the attack, her husband David was in the hospital due to an illness, leaving her alone. Manuela's murder haunted David thereafter, in part because the killer continued to stalk him and called the house several times after the murder, and also because police and neighbors suspected him as Manuela's killer. This suspicion heightened when David married a sympathetic co-worker named Rhonda not long after the murder. David became an alcoholic, and his second marriage ended after nearly a decade when Rhonda Witthuhn divorced him. Years later he was exonerated by DNA testing. He died in 2008.

On July 27, 35-year-old Cheri Domingo and 27-year-old Gregory Sanchez became the Original Night Stalker's tenth and eleventh murder victims. Both were attacked in Domingo's residence on Toltec Way in Goleta (several blocks south of Robert Offerman's condominium), where Domingo was living temporarily; it was owned by a relative and up for sale. The offender entered the house through a small bathroom window. Sanchez was shot and bludgeoned. Some believe that he may have realized he was dealing with the man responsible for the Offerman–Manning murders and tried to tackle the killer rather than be tied up. Again, no neighbors responded to the gunshot. Sanchez's head was covered with clothes pulled from the closet. Domingo was raped and bludgeoned, and died of head injuries; bruises on her wrists and ankles indicated that she had been tied, although the restraints were missing. A piece of shipping twine was found near the bed, and fibers from an unknown source were scattered over her body. Authorities believed at the time that the attacker may have worked as a painter or in a similar job at the Calle Real Shopping Centre.

Since only one further murder—the target being a lone woman and not a couple—has been attributed to DeAngelo, Paul Holes later speculated that the experience of fighting with Sanchez, a "significantly larger male", may have frightened DeAngelo and deterred him from committing more murders.

==== 1986 ====
On May 5, 18-year-old Janelle Lisa Cruz was found dead after she was raped and bludgeoned in her Irvine home. Her family was on vacation in Mexico at the time of the attack. The house was for sale and her body was discovered by a realtor who stopped by to show the house to a prospective buyer. Janelle's body was found on her bed, beaten beyond recognition, with her teeth found in both her hair and lungs. A pipe wrench, reported missing by Cruz's stepfather, was thought to be the murder weapon.

=== Other suspected murders ===
After DeAngelo was arrested, he was also suspected of committing the 1974 Visalia rape and murder of Jennifer Armour, the 1975 Exeter rape and murder of Donna Jo Richmond, and a 1978 murder of a woman and her son in Simi Valley, but was cleared as a suspect in all four murders by DNA testing. Victoria Police ruled out a link between DeAngelo, who docked in Australia during his Navy service, and the Melbourne serial child rapist and murderer known as "Mr Cruel".

==== Unsuccessful attempts to link perpetrators ====
The lack of communication between departments made linking the perpetrator difficult. In addition, sharing information was territorial, with agencies not wanting other agencies solving their own cases. According to one deputy, The Sacramento Sheriff's Department wanted the glory of catching him, and egos were in the way. Carol Daly also stated there was competition with the various divisions. The department had linked four attacks by September 1976, but told the media not to report on it until October.

Visalia PD Detective Bill McGowen, who was shot at during the VR Crime Spree, went to Sacramento to determine if the EAR was the same perpetrator on May 18, 1977. At this point 23 rapes had occurred. After the Maggiore murders, the Sacramento County Sheriff's Office adamantly denied a link and accused Visalia investigators of looking for publicity.

After the first murders of Dr. Robert Offerman and Dr. Debra Manning, some law enforcement suspected that the EAR was responsible. Sergeant Jim Bevins of the Sacramento Sheriff's Department who headed the EAR Taskforce, along with Richard Shelby both believed it was the East Area Rapist. Bevins first called the Santa Barbara's Sheriff's who denied the murders outright. Larry Crompton of the Contra Costa County EAR Taskforce attempted to contact the Santa Barbara's Sheriff's next and the same thing happened. Crompton would learn of them in March, three months later. Crompton alleges that this was due to Ronald Reagan owning a ranch in Santa Barbara County and not wanting the media attention. An LA times article confirms this, with the added detail that the Sheriffs had just finished handling the public outrage of Thor Christiansen. Kim Stewart, a detective with the Santa Barbara Sheriff stated similar, saying the Sheriff's department made a deal with a board of realtors to not publicize certain crimes. The Santa Barbara Sheriff's office later attempted to link the couple slayings as a "Night Stalker", however the Ventura and Orange County authorities were not convinced.

In 1997, Paul Holes contacted Crompton, who shared his theory that the Offerman-Manning murders were the work of the EAR. When Holes tried contacting the Santa Barbara Sheriffs office, they denied having any cases resembling the case, and flat-out stated they were unrelated. However, they did direct Holes with the Irvine Police department, who they knew were doing something with DNA. However, since Holes' lab was using older PCR technology, and the Irvine lab newer STR tech, Holes wasn't able to make the connection at the time.

== Communications ==
=== Written ===
==== "Excitement's Crave" poem ====
In December 1977, someone claiming to be the East Area Rapist sent a poem, "Excitement's Crave", to The Sacramento Bee, the Sacramento mayor's office, and television station KVIE. On December 11, a masked man eluded pursuit by law-enforcement personnel after alerting authorities by telephone that he would strike on Watt Avenue that night:

Excitement's Crave

All those mortal's surviving birth
Upon facing maturity,
Take inventory of their worth
To prevailing society.

Choosing values becomes a task;
Oneself must seek satisfaction.
The selected route will unmask
Character when plans take action.

Accepting some work to perform
At fixed pay, but promise for more,
Is a recognized social norm,
As is decorum, seeking lore.

Achieving while others lifting
Should be cause for deserving fame.
Leisure tempts excitement seeking,
What's right and expected seems tame.

"Jessie James" has been seen by all,
And "Son of Sam" has an author.
Others now feel temptations call.
Sacramento should make an offer.

To make a movie of my life
That will pay for my planned exile.
Just now I'd like to add the wife
Of a Mafia lord to my file.

Your East Area Rapist
And deserving pest.
See you in the press or on T.V.

==== Homework pages and punishment map (December 9, 1978) ====
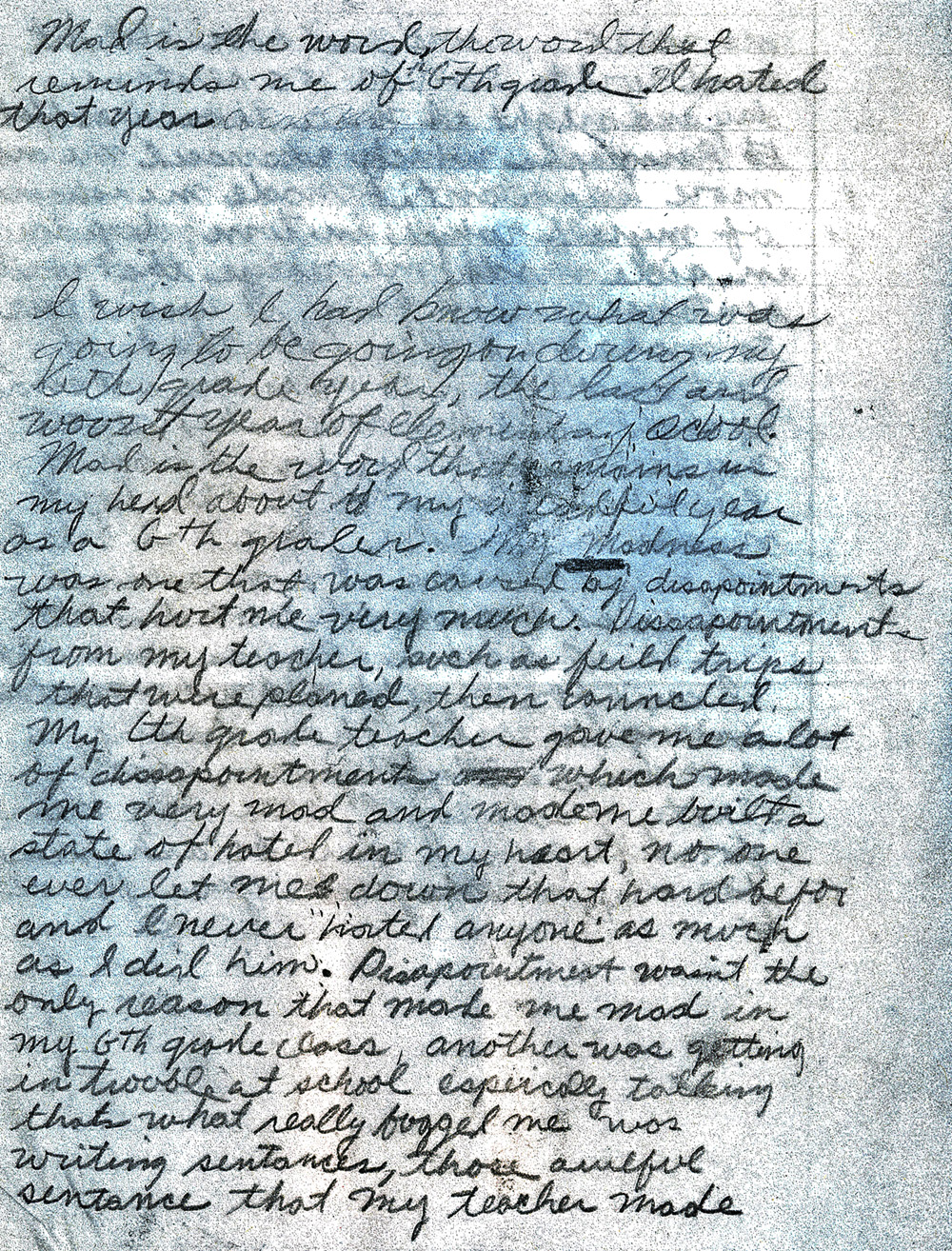
Front of "Mad is the Word"

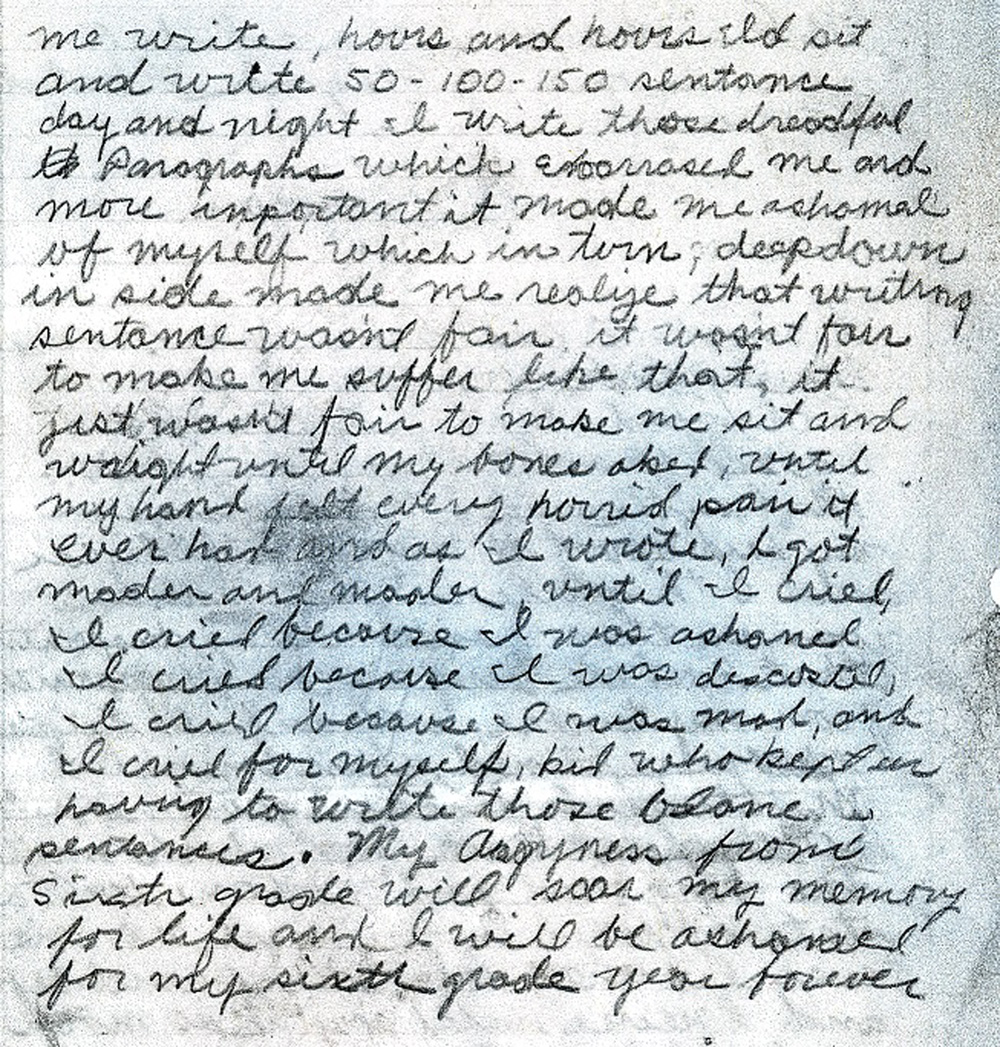
Reverse of "Mad is the Word"

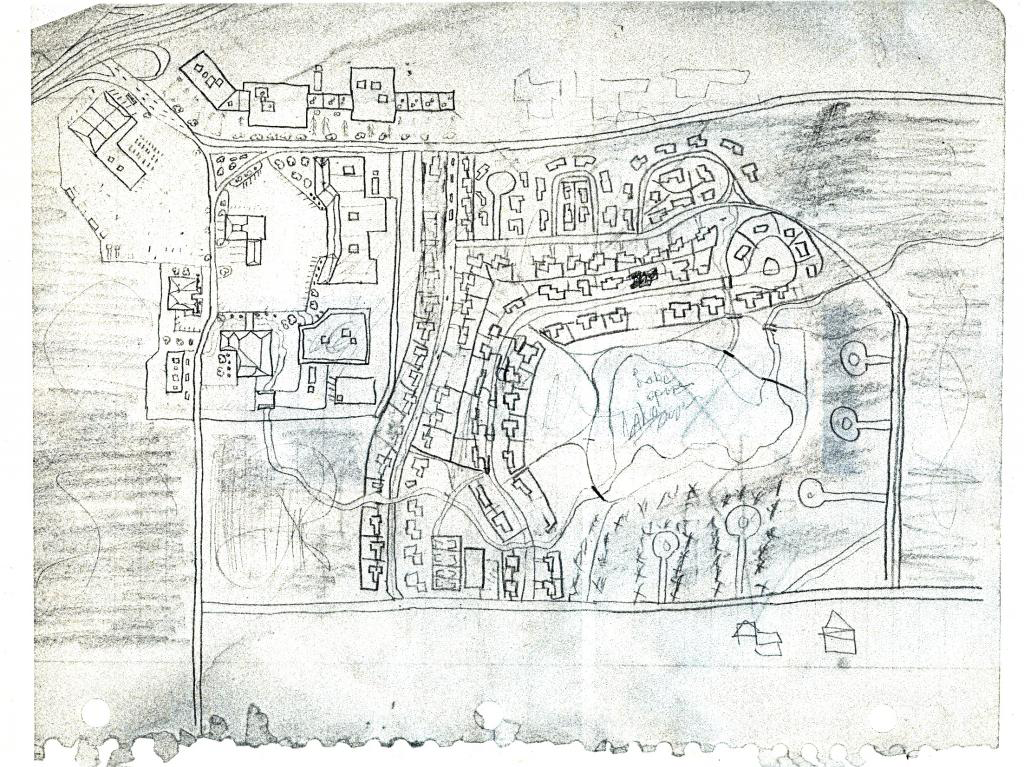
Front of the "punishment" map

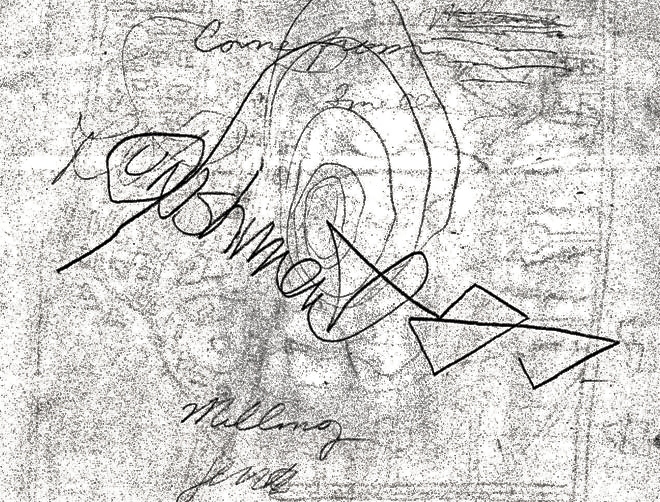
Reverse of the map, with the word "punishment" scrawled across the page

During the investigation in Danville of the 42nd attack, investigators discovered three sheets of notebook paper near where a suspicious vehicle had reportedly been parked. They believe the pages were dropped accidentally, perhaps by falling out of a bag. The first sheet appears to be a homework essay on General George Armstrong Custer.

The second sheet contains a journal-style entry describing a teacher who made students write lines, which the author found humiliating:

"Mad is the word, the word that reminds me of 6th grade. I hated that year ... I wish I had know what was going to be going on during my 6th-grade year, the last and worst year of elementary school. Mad is the word that remains in my head about my dreadful year as a 6th grader. My Madness was one that was caused by disapointments that hurt me very much. Dissapointments from my teacher, such as feild trips that were planed, then canncled. My 6th-grade teacher gave me a lot of dissapointments which made me very mad and made me built a state of hatred in my heart, no one ever let me down that hard before and I never hated anyone as much as I did him. Disapointment wasn't the only reason that made me mad in my sixth-grade class, another was getting in trouble at school espeically talking thats what really bugged me was writing sentances, those awful sentance that my teacher made ... me write, hours and hours Id sit and write 50-100-150 sentance day and night I write those dreadful Paragraphs which embarrased me and more inportant it made me ashamed of myself which in turn, deep down in side made me realize that writing sentance wasn't fair it wasn't fair to make me suffer like that, it just wasn't fair to make me sit and wright until my bones aked, until my hand felt every horrid pain it ever had and as I wrote, I got mader and mader until I cried, I cried because I was ashamed I cried because I was discusted, I cried because I was mad, and I cried for myself, kid who kept on having to write those dane sentances. My Angryness from Sixth grade will scar my memory for life and I will be ashamed for my sixth grade year forever"

On the last sheet was a hand-drawn map of what appears to be a suburban neighborhood, with the word "punishment" scrawled across the reverse side. Investigators were unable to identify the area depicted in the map, although the artist clearly had knowledge of architectural layout and landscape design. According to Detective Larry Pool, the map is a fantasy location representing the rapist's desired striking ground.

=== Phone calls ===
==== "I'm the East Side Rapist" (March 18, 1977) ====
On March 18, 1977, the Sacramento County Sheriff's Office received three calls from a man claiming to be the East Area Rapist; none were recorded. The first two calls, received at 4:15 and 4:30 p.m., were identical and ended with the caller laughing and hanging up. During the third call, received at 5:00 p.m., the man on the other line said: "I'm the East Side Rapist and I have my next victim already stalked and you guys can't catch me."

==== "You're never gonna catch me" (December 2, 1977) ====
A man claiming to be the rapist called the Sacramento Police Department, saying: "You're never gonna catch me, East Area Rapist, you dumb fuckers; I'm gonna fuck again tonight. Be careful!" The call was recorded and later released.

==== "It's me again" (December 9, 1977) ====
At approximately 5:40 p.m. on December 9, 1977, the twenty-first rape victim received a phone call at her residence. After a few moments of silence, she said: "Hello?", to which a male voice on the other line responded in a hoarse whisper: "Merry Christmas. It's me again", before rapidly hanging up. The victim later told investigators that she "knew it was [the rapist]" and that she'd "never forget his voice."

==== "Watt Avenue" (December 10, 1977) ====
Shortly before 10:00 p.m. on December 10, 1977, Sacramento authorities received two identical calls, saying, "I am going to hit tonight. Watt Avenue." Both were recorded, and the caller was identified as the same person who placed the call on December 2. Law-enforcement patrols were increased that night; and at 2:30 a.m., a masked man eluded officers after being seen bicycling on the Watt Avenue bridge. When spotted again at 4:30 a.m., he discarded the bicycle and fled on foot.

==== "Gonna kill you" (January 2, 1978) ====
The first known rape victim received a wrong-number call asking for "Ray" on January 2, 1978. The call was recorded, and police suspect that it may have been the same caller who made a threatening call to her later that evening. That call was also recorded and identified by the victim as the voice of her assailant. The caller said, "Gonna kill you ... gonna kill you ... gonna kill you ... bitch ... bitch ... bitch ... bitch ... fuckin' whore."

==== Counseling service (January 6, 1978) ====
A man claiming to be the East Area Rapist called the Contact Counseling Service and said, "I have a problem. I need help because I don't want to do this anymore." After a short conversation, the caller said, "I believe you are tracing this call" and hung up.

==== Later calls (1982–1991) ====
In October 1982, a previous victim received a call at her place of work—a Denny's restaurant—during which the caller threatened to rape her again. According to Contra Costa County investigator Paul Holes, the caller must have chanced to patronize the restaurant and recognized his victim there.

In 1991, a previous victim received a phone call from the perpetrator and spoke with him for one minute. She could hear a woman and children in the background, leading to speculation that he had a family.

==== Final call (2001) ====
On April 6, 2001, one day after The Sacramento Bee linked the Original Night Stalker and the East Area Rapist, a victim of the rapist received a call from him. He asked, "Remember when we played?"

== Investigation ==
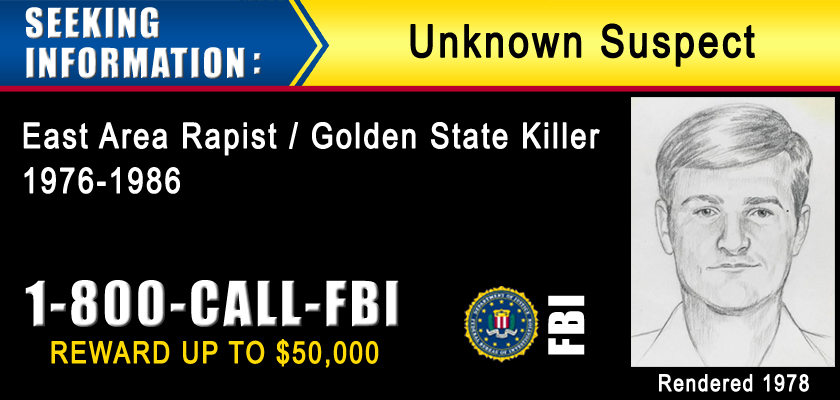
Billboard advertisement appealing for information (2016)

Before officially connecting the Original Night Stalker to the East Area Rapist in 2001, some law-enforcement officials (particularly from the Sacramento County Sheriff's Department) sought to link the Goleta cases as well. The links were primarily due to similarities in modus operandi. One of the already-linked Original Night Stalker double murders occurred in Ventura, 40 miles (64 km) southeast of Goleta; and the remaining murders were committed in Orange County, an additional 90 miles (140 km) southeast. In 2001, several rapes in Contra Costa County believed to have been committed by the East Area Rapist were linked by DNA to the Smith, Harrington, Witthuhn, and Cruz murders. A decade later, DNA evidence indicated that the Domingo–Sanchez murders were also committed by the East Area Rapist (also identified as the Golden State Killer).

On June 15, 2016, the FBI released further information related to the crimes, including new composite sketches and crime details; a $50,000 reward was also announced. The initiative included a national database to support law enforcement's investigating of the crimes and to handle tips and information.

Identification of DeAngelo began in December 2017 by officials, led by detective Paul Holes and FBI lawyer Steve Kramer. They hit a roadblock when then District Attorney Tony Rackauckas rejected their request for a DNA sample, directing the Irvine PD to not release the sample. A pristine sample from the Smith murder was taken from a duplicate rape kit, something uniquely done by Ventura's medical examiner. Once they uploaded the killer's DNA profile from a Ventura County rape kit to the personal genomics website GEDmatch. The website identified 10 to 20 people who had the same great-great-great-grandparents as the Golden State Killer; a team of five investigators working with genealogist Barbara Rae-Venter used this list to construct a large family tree. From this tree, they established two suspects; one was ruled out by a relative's DNA test, leaving DeAngelo the main suspect.

Eventually, "through the use of genetic genealogy searching on GEDmatch, investigators identified distant relatives of DeAngelo—including family members directly related to his great-great-great-great grandfather dating back to the 1800s. Based on this information, investigators built about 25 different family trees. The tree that eventually linked to [DeAngelo] alone contained approximately 1,000 people. Over the course of a few months, investigators used other clues like age, sex, and place of residence to rule out suspects populating these trees, eliminating suspects one by one until only DeAngelo remained."

On April 18, 2018, a DNA sample was surreptitiously collected from the door handle of DeAngelo's car; another sample was later collected from a tissue found in DeAngelo's curbside garbage can. Both were matched to samples associated with Golden State Killer crimes. Since DeAngelo's arrest, some commentators have raised concerns about the ethics of the secondary use of personally identifiable information. During the investigation, several people were considered and later eliminated as suspects:

- Brett Glasby, from Goleta, was considered a suspect by Santa Barbara County investigators. He was murdered in Mexico in 1982 before the murder of Janelle Cruz, eliminating him as a suspect.
- Paul "Cornfed" Schneider, a high-ranking member of the Aryan Brotherhood, was living in Orange County when the Harringtons, Manuela Witthuhn, and Janelle Cruz were killed. A DNA test cleared him in the 1990s.
- Joe Alsip, a friend and business partner of the victim Lyman Smith. Alsip's pastor said that Alsip had confessed to him during a family-counseling session. Alsip was arraigned for the Smith murders in 1982, but the charges were later dropped, and his innocence was confirmed by DNA testing in 1997.
- Gregory Gonzalez, from Garden Grove, attended the same drug rehabilitation class that Janelle Cruz was enrolled in. An informant told police that Gonzalez confessed to killing her and he was arrested, but charges were dropped a year later when a blood test confirmed his innocence.

== Arrest, trial and incarceration ==
On the afternoon of April 24, 2018, Sacramento County Sheriff's deputies arrested DeAngelo in the side yard of his Sacramento home. He was charged with eight counts of first-degree murder with special circumstances. On May 10, the Santa Barbara County District Attorney's office charged DeAngelo with four additional counts of first-degree murder.

According to Sacramento County prosecutor Thien Ho, DeAngelo said the following to himself while alone in a police interrogation room after his arrest in April 2018: "I didn't have the strength to push him out. He made me. He went with me. It was like in my head, I mean, he's a part of me. I didn't want to do those things. I pushed Jerry out and had a happy life. I did all those things. I destroyed all their lives. So now I've got to pay the price." Prosecutors believe this was a tactic to manipulate police, or to establish an insanity defense. DeAngelo had admitted to using a similar tactic when he was arrested for shoplifting in 1979. Detectives ignored DeAngelo's initial requests to speak to an attorney, later citing a legal theory that this potential Miranda violation would be justified, with the understanding that prosecutors could not use the interview against the defendant in court.

DeAngelo could not be charged with rapes or burglaries, as the statute of limitations had expired for those offenses, but he was charged with 13 counts of murder and 13 counts of kidnapping. DeAngelo was arraigned in Sacramento on August 23, 2018. In November 2018, prosecutors from six involved counties collectively estimated that the case could cost taxpayers $20 million and last 10 years. At an April 10, 2019, court proceeding, prosecutors announced that they would seek the death penalty, and the judge ruled that cameras could be allowed inside the courtroom during the trial.

On March 4, 2020, DeAngelo offered to plead guilty if the death penalty was excluded as a possible sentence, which was not accepted at the time. On June 29, as part of a plea bargain to avoid the death penalty, DeAngelo pleaded guilty to 13 counts of first-degree murder and special circumstances (including murder committed during burglaries and rapes), as well as thirteen counts of kidnapping. On August 21, 2020, DeAngelo received multiple consecutive life sentences without the possibility of parole.

DeAngelo offered a brief apology after listening to days of pre-sentencing victim impact statements: "I've listened to all your statements, each one of them, and I'm truly sorry to everyone I've hurt." In November 2020, DeAngelo was transferred to the North Kern State Prison. As of February 2025, DeAngelo is incarcerated in protective custody at California State Prison, Corcoran.

Prosecutors have speculated that DeAngelo's motive for his crimes was a desire for power and control over the victims, due to a feeling of powerlessness and inadequacy in his personal life.

== See also ==
- List of serial killers in the United States
- List of serial rapists by number of victims
- List of longest prison sentences
