= Los Angeles (magazine) =

American magazine

- December 2009 cover
- Editor-in-Chief: Jasmin Rosemberg
- Executive Director of Digital: Andrew Curry
- Creative Director: Ada Guerin
- Categories: Local magazine
- Frequency: Monthly
- Publisher: Chris Gialanella
- Founded: 1960
- Company: Engine Vision Media LLC
- Country: United States
- Based in: Los Angeles
- Language: English
- Website: lamag.com
- ISSN: 1522-9149
- OCLC: 60618447

Los Angeles, formerly known as Southern California Prompter, is a monthly magazine based in Los Angeles, California. It focuses on regional news, culture, lifestyle, entertainment, and fashion stories from Los Angeles and the broader Southern California area.

== History ==
The magazine was founded in 1960 by graduate student Geoff Miller and advertising executive David Brown. Originally named Southern California Prompter, it was renamed Los Angeles in 1961.

Miller was the editor-in-chief from 1974 to 1990 and later was the publisher until his retirement in 1994.

The magazine changed ownership several times. It was purchased by CHC in 1973, by ABC in 1977, and later by The Walt Disney Company. In 2000, Disney sold the magazine to Emmis Communications. On February 28, 2017, Hour Media LLC acquired the magazine from Emmis.

On December 5, 2022, attorneys Mark Geragos and Ben Meiselas acquired the magazine through Engine Vision Media, LLC. In April 2023, Chris Gialanella was appointed President and Publisher of Los Angeles, along with other regional publications. In November 2024, Andrew Curry became Executive Digital Editor, and Jasmin Rosemberg was named Editor-in-Chief.

== Digital presence ==
Since May 20, 1996, lamag.com has been the web version of the magazine, providing digital content related to local news and coverage of culture and food.

== Content and editorial ==
The magazine focuses on various aspects of life in Southern California, including culture and regional news.

As of 2024, the editorial team is led by editor-in-chief Jasmin Rosemberg, and the business side is led by publisher Christopher Gialanella.

== Events ==
Los Angeles organizes and participates in several events throughout the year, such as:

- The Food Event 2024.
- Best of Beauty Awards 2024.
- Concern Foundation's 48th Annual Block Party in collaboration with Los Angeles.
- LA Woman Happy Hour and Power Panel (2023).
- Pop-up dinners featuring chefs including Rocco DiSpirito and Giada De Laurentiis.
- The Super Lawyers Cocktail Party.
- Pride Month celebration events.
- Whiskey Festival 2024.

== Awards and recognition ==
Los Angeles has received four National Magazine Awards.

=== National Arts & Entertainment Journalism Awards ===
In 2024, Los Angeles was recognized at the National Arts and Entertainment Journalism Awards, winning first place in the Entertainment Publication's Print category for its issue "L.A. Stays in the Picture: The Movies We Call Home."

The complete list of awards received at the event includes:

Year	Award	Category	Recipient(s)	Placement
2024	National Arts & Entertainment Journalism Awards	Entertainment Publication, Print	Los Angeles	1st place
2024	National Arts & Entertainment Journalism Awards	Feature Photo	Elisabeth Caren, Ada Guerin (Portrait of Kris Jenner)	1st place
2024	National Arts & Entertainment Journalism Awards	Portrait Photo, Music/Arts	Irvin Rivera, Ada Guerin ("Margaret Cho - Ride or Die Bride")	2nd place
2024	National Arts & Entertainment Journalism Awards	Animation/Moving Graphic	Jen Rosenstein, Ada Guerin ("Smoove Operator—JB Smoove")	3rd place
2024	National Arts & Entertainment Journalism Awards	Commentary Analysis/Trend, Music, Online	Malina Saval ("Boaz, Bruce and 'Born to Run.'")	3rd place

=== SoCal Journalism Awards ===
Los Angeles has been recognized at the SoCal Journalism Awards.

==== 2024 awards ====
Year	Award	Category	Recipient(s)	Placement	Article/Cover/Graphic
2024	SoCal Journalism Awards	Personality Profile, Politics/Business/Arts Personalities	Michael Slenske	Winner	"Henry Taylor, L.A.'s Favorite Painter, Flips the Retrospective"
2024	SoCal Journalism Awards	Business Reporting	Michele McPhee	3rd place	"From Ring to Real Estate: Floyd Mayweather Exposes a Possible Megamansion Tax Scam"
2024	SoCal Journalism Awards	Lifestyle Feature	Jon Regardie	Winner	"How to Survive L.A. on Just $100K"
2024	SoCal Journalism Awards	Cover Art	Andre Miripolsky, Ada Guerin, Shirley Halperin	Winner	"Best of L.A."
2024	SoCal Journalism Awards	Page Design	Shirley Halperin, Ada Guerin, Neil Jamieson	Winner	"How to Survive L.A. on Just $100K"
2024	SoCal Journalism Awards	Best Issue	Los Angeles magazine team	3rd place	November 2023 issue
2024	SoCal Journalism Awards	Illustration	Ada Guerin, Irvin Rivera	3rd place	"Margaret Cho — Ride or Die Bride"
2024	SoCal Journalism Awards	Graphic Design	Neil Jamieson, Ada Guerin	Winner	"Operation Johnson"

==== 2023 awards ====
Year	Award	Category	Recipient(s)	Placement	Article/Cover
2023	SoCal Journalism Awards	Personality Profile	Los Angeles	Winner	"Jeremy Renner Rises Again"
2023	SoCal Journalism Awards	Investigative Reporting	Los Angeles	Winner	"Hollywood's Bleeding: Inside the City's Homeless Crisis"
2023	SoCal Journalism Awards	Lifestyle Feature	Los Angeles	Winner	"The Best Cocktails in L.A."
2023	SoCal Journalism Awards	Cover Art	Los Angeles	Winner	"Best of L.A."
2023	SoCal Journalism Awards	Page Design	Los Angeles	Winner	"The Future of Fashion"
2023	SoCal Journalism Awards	Best Issue	Los Angeles magazine team	3rd place	November 2022 issue

==== 2022 awards ====
Year	Award	Category	Recipient(s)	Placement	Article/Cover
2022	SoCal Journalism Awards	Personality Profile, Politics/Business/Arts Personalities	Los Angeles	Winner	"The Maverick Mayor"
2022	SoCal Journalism Awards	Business Reporting	Los Angeles	Winner	"How Hollywood is Losing Billions"
2022	SoCal Journalism Awards	Lifestyle Feature	Los Angeles	Winner	"How to Survive L.A. on Just $100K"
2022	SoCal Journalism Awards	Cover Art	Los Angeles	Winner	"L.A.'s Power Players"
2022	SoCal Journalism Awards	Best Issue	Los Angeles magazine team	3rd place	September 2021 issue

==== 2021 awards ====
Year	Award	Category	Recipient(s)	Placement	Article/Cover
2021	SoCal Journalism Awards	Personality Profile	Los Angeles	Winner	"The Comeback King"
2021	SoCal Journalism Awards	Investigative Reporting	Los Angeles	Winner	"L.A.'s Homeless Epidemic"
2021	SoCal Journalism Awards	Business Reporting	Los Angeles	Winner	"The Real Estate Boom"
2021	SoCal Journalism Awards	Cover Art	Los Angeles	Winner	"L.A. Confidential"
2021	SoCal Journalism Awards	Best Issue	Los Angeles magazine team	3rd place	December 2020 issue

=== Industry recognition and affiliations ===
As of 2013, the magazine was a member of the City and Regional Magazine Association.
