= Paul Conway =

Paul Conway may refer to:

- Paul Conway (butcher) (born 1978), Scottish butcher
- Paul Conway (archivist) (born 1953), American academic
- Paul Conway (soccer) (born 1970), American soccer (football) player
- Paul T. Conway, former president of Generation Opportunity
