= Freedom Partners =

Former public advocacy organization

- Freedom Partners logo
- Founded: November 2011
- Dissolved: 2019
- Type: Chamber of commerce 501(c)(6)
- Tax ID no.: 45-3732750 (EIN)
- Location: Arlington, Virginia
- Members: 200
- Revenue: $255,674,218 (FY 2011)
- Formerly called: Association for American Innovation

Freedom Partners was a nonprofit 501(c)(6) organization headquartered in Arlington, Virginia. The organization, which was founded in 2011 under the name Association for American Innovation, was purposed to promote "the benefits of free markets and a free society." It was partially funded by the Koch brothers, and sponsored various Republican politicians and conservative groups. The group was dissolved in 2019 amidst a restructuring of the Koch family's giving.

== Membership ==
Freedom Partners was structured as a chamber of commerce and was composed of around 200 members who each paid a minimum US$100,000 in annual dues. In 2012, the organization raised $256 million.

The organization was partially funded by the Koch brothers, although it operated independently of Koch Industries. A majority of Freedom Partners board was made up of long-time employees of Koch entities.

== Activities ==
Freedom Partners gave grants worth a total of $236 million to conservative organizations including Tea Party groups like the Tea Party Patriots and organizations which opposed the Affordable Care Act prior to the 2012 election. In 2012, Freedom Partners made a grant of $115 million to the Center to Protect Patient Rights. Ahead of the 2012 presidential election, Freedom Partners donated $8.1 million to the Concerned Women for America Legislative Action Committee.

It awarded grants to advocacy organizations with the goal of raising public awareness about "important societal and economic issues".

== See also ==
- Americans for Prosperity
- KochPAC
- Stand Together
