= Paul T. Conway =

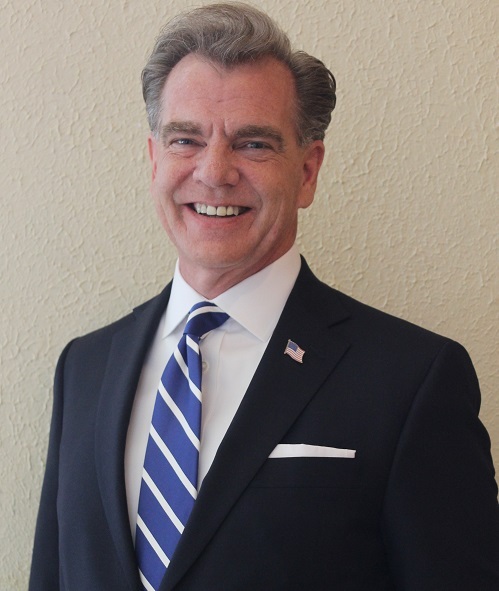

Paul T. Conway is the Chair of Policy and Global Affairs and the former president of the American Association of Kidney Patients. Conway is also the former president of Generation Opportunity. He was chief of staff for the United States Department of Labor under Secretary Elaine Chao, chief of staff at the United States Office of Personnel Management, and an agency chief at the United States Department of Homeland Security. He is a former deputy director of the Citizen Project at The Heritage Foundation.

== Department of Homeland Security ==
While at DHS, Conway served as Chief of Staff to the Federal Coordinator for Gulf Coast Rebuilding and twice as the Acting Federal Coordinator. He was awarded the Secretary's Silver Medal by Secretary Michael Chertoff.

== Generation Opportunity ==
Conway led Generation Opportunity, a Koch brothers-funded group whose focus was engaging Millennials, young Americans between the ages of 18 and 29, and mobilizing them on issues of importance, prior to and during their public rollout in June 2011 through November 2012. During Generation Opportunity’s first 18 months, from June 2011 through November 2012, its 28-person team contacted 250,000 people in person, generated 1.1 billion views of its social media content, and attracted 4 million Facebook fans. While Generation Opportunity focused on multiple issues of importance to young Americans, the issue of youth unemployment among Millennials dominated the discussion. Conway told the Hillsdale Natural Law Review that "the number one issue to them was the lack of full-time jobs... [T]hey blamed the President for that, not Congress", he said.

On November 13, 2012, the Hillsdale Natural Law Review wrote about the impact Generation Opportunity had on the 2012 election during its first eighteen months. “In 2008, Senator Barack Obama won the youth vote (18-29 year olds) by 34 points – 66%-32%. In 2012, Obama won the same demographic by only 23 points: 60%-37%. The youth vote swung 11 points in favor of the Republican ticket. No other demographic changed half this much between 2008 and 2012. Voters between the ages of 30 and 44 swung 1 point closer to Obama, while 5% of those 45-64 left him, along with 4% of seniors above 65. The youth vote swung against Obama despite the fact that more young people voted in 2012 than in 2008. In 2008, 66% of the 22 million Millennials who made it to the polls translated to 14.53 million votes. This year, 60% of 23 million Millennials voted for Obama, a total of 13.8 million. "By 2020, 38% of the electorate will be Millennials ... The drop in enthusiasm among young voters…is important." Due – at least in part – to Generation Opportunity’s hard work, President Obama "lost six points among the most critical base he had", said Conway, who praised young Americans as "very smart ... [and] able to connect the dots."

Starting in September 2013, Generation Opportunity began running online ads utilizing a "Creepy Uncle Sam", with the tagline "Don't let government play doctor". According to the group's president, Evan Feinberg, the ads are meant to promote an "opt-out" option, where young people would "...have to pay a fine, but that's going to be cheaper for you and better for you”.
