= Eric Black (disambiguation) =

Eric Black (born 1963) is a Scottish footballer.

Eric Black may also refer to:

- Eric Black (writer), American journalist
- Eric Black (Canadian football) (born 1999), American football player
