= Yeti (disambiguation) =

The Yeti, or Abominable Snowman, is a legendary apelike beast said to inhabit the Himalayan region of Nepal and Tibet.

Yeti may also refer to:

== People ==
- Yeti, a ring name of professional wrestler Ron Reis (b. 1970)
- Sarah Urist Green, often referred to as "the yeti" by her husband, John Green, in his YouTube videos

== Art, entertainment, and media ==
=== Fictional entities ===
- Yeti (comics), the codenames of two unrelated fictional Marvel Comics characters
- Yeti (Doctor Who), a fictional race of robots, also called Abominable Snowmen, in the Doctor Who universe
- Yeti (Monsters, Inc.), character in the Monsters, Inc. franchise

=== Music ===
- Yeti (album), a 1970 psychedelic rock album by Amon Düül II
- Yeti (band), a British indie rock band

=== Periodicals ===
- Yeti (magazine), a series of large-format music magazines featuring music contributions and interviews from predominantly indie artists
- The Yeti (magazine), an independent writing publication from Tallahassee, Florida
- The Yeti with Betty, a comic

=== Other art, media, and entertainment ===
- Yeti: Curse of the Snow Demon, a 2008 monster movie featured on the Sci Fi Channel
- The Yeti (film), a 2026 American horror film
- Yetisports, a Flash game
- Yeti, a combat robot competing in BattleBots
- "The Yeti", a 1963 episode of Bolek and Lolek

== Brands and enterprises ==
- Yeti (Japanese company), a Japanese visual novel video game company
- Yeti (American company), an American luxury cooler company
- Yeti, a USB microphone from Blue Microphones
- Yeti Cycles, American high end mountain bike brand

== Science and technology ==
- "Yeti crab", an informal name for the genus Kiwa (crustacean)

== Transportation ==
- Yeti, a diesel locomotive on the Snowdon Mountain Railway in Gwynedd, north-west Wales
- Delta Yeti, a mini SUV model built by the Italian car manufacturer Delta Veicoli Speciali
- Škoda Yeti, a mini SUV model built by the Czech car manufacturer Škoda Auto
- Yeti Airlines, an airline based in Nepal
- Yeti Cycles, a bicycle manufacturer in Golden, Colorado

== See also ==
- Abominable Snowman (disambiguation)
- The Yetties, an English folk music group
