= White House State Ballroom =

Under-construction expansion to the White House

Coordinates: 38°53′51.2″N 77°2′8.4″W

- The ballroom under construction in November 16, 2026

General information
- Status: Under construction
- Construction started: September 2025; 1 year ago

Design and construction
- Architect: Shalom Baranes

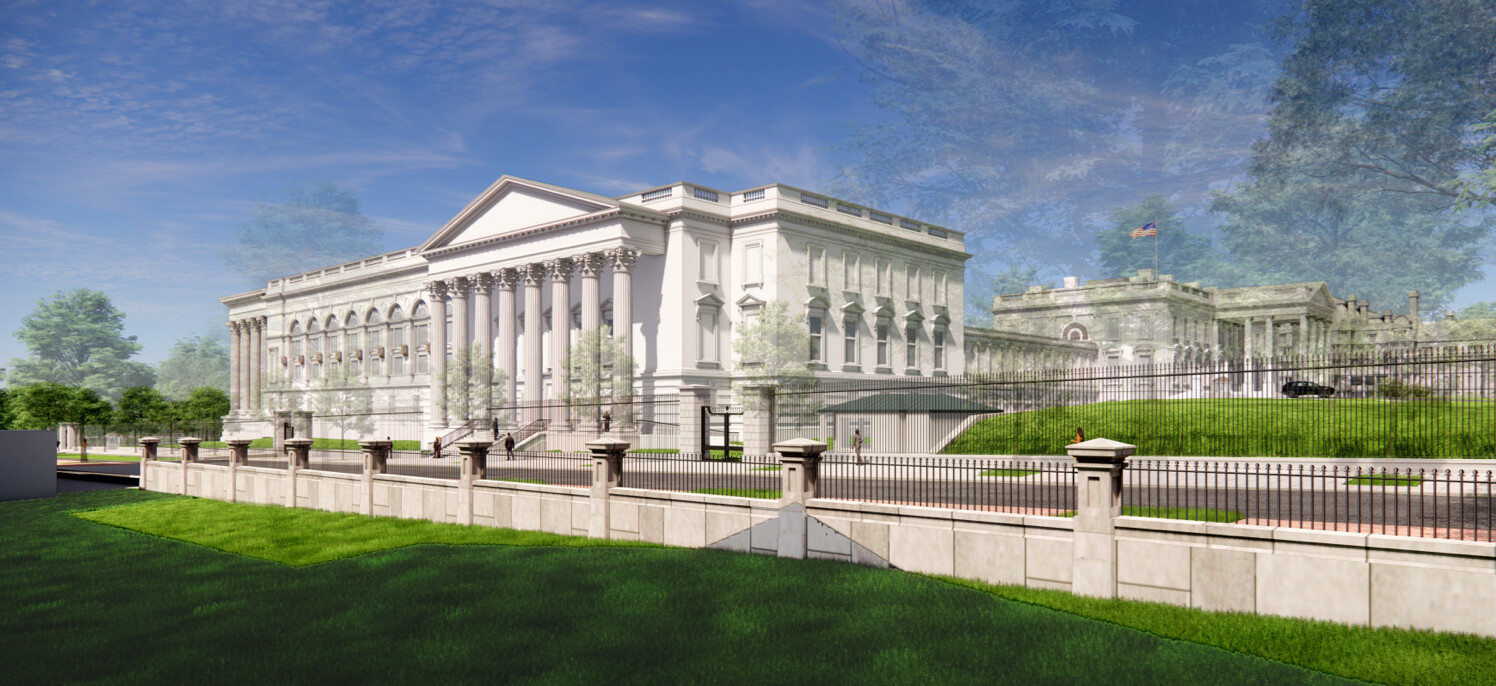
Rendering of planned ballroom viewed from the northeast

The White House State Ballroom is part of a new East Wing under construction at the White House, the official residence of the president of the United States. The new East Wing will replace the original East Wing, which was built in 1902 and torn down in October 2025 in preparation for the new wing's construction. The site, in Washington, D.C., has been under construction since September 2025.

Announced in July 2025 and planned to open in September 2028, the stated purpose of the White House State Ballroom is to add a venue with a higher seating capacity than the East Room for formal events such as state dinners, and to add a secure event space for future presidents. The new East Wing is being built atop an under-construction six-story bunker that will replace the Presidential Emergency Operations Center that was demolished with the original East Wing.

The project has been criticized for its funding, design, permitting process and destruction of historic architectural and landscape features. The National Capital Planning Commission approved the final project design in April 2026. The project's above-ground construction has faced legal challenges. As of August 31, 2026, the Supreme Court has allowed construction to continue.

== Background ==
Traditionally, formal events at the White House are held in the East Room of the Executive Residence, which has a seating capacity of 200 people, or in specially constructed tents on the White House grounds for state dinners. President Joe Biden held four of his six state dinners outdoors using tents. President Donald Trump described the tents used for events as "not a pretty sight". The tents, described by a former White House chef as "embarrassing" and as resulting in guests being "elbow to elbow", often cost $1 million or more for each event. During President Barack Obama's first term in office, at least as early as 2010, then-private citizen Trump spoke to senior advisor David Axelrod and expressed a desire to build a ballroom on White House grounds.

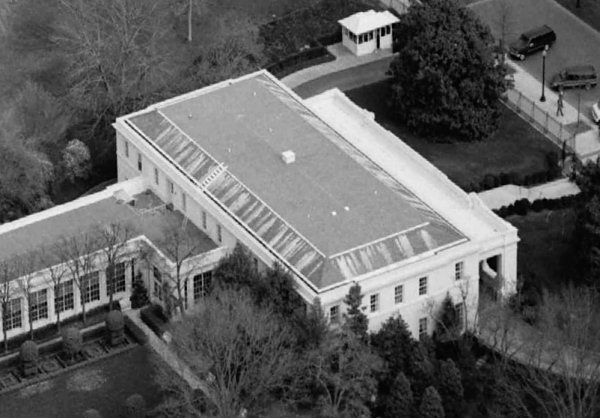
Aerial view of the East Wing of the White House in 1992

The first White House East Wing was designed by Charles Follen McKim and built in 1902 during the Theodore Roosevelt renovations as an entrance for formal and public visitors, on the site of the former East Terrace that was added during Thomas Jefferson's presidency and demolished in 1866. An expansion, including a second story, was instituted in 1942, during Franklin D. Roosevelt's presidency, primarily to cover the construction of an underground bunker, the Presidential Emergency Operations Center (PEOC).

The White House has undergone a number of other renovations and restorations in the roughly 230 years of its existence. A major above-ground structural change was the Truman Balcony in 1948. This was followed by the White House Reconstruction from 1949 to 1952 while President Harry S. Truman was in office. To save the then 150-year-old building from collapse, the entire interior structure of the Executive Residence was numbered and dismantled. Splitting beams and burned timbers damaged by the British in the War of 1812 were removed. The foundation of the outer walls was stabilized and reinforced. A basement and sub basement were dug, and then all four floors were reconstructed on a new steel frame inside the original sandstone walls. Since then, the White House Curator has overseen much smaller projects and redecorations in the actual Executive Residence. New features like swimming pools, tennis courts and bowling alleys were added by various presidents after Truman's renovation. A nuclear-proof bunker was built 60 feet (18 m) under the White House during the Obama administration, designed for dozens of people to survive for several weeks.

== Planning ==
Initial ground plan according to Newsweek reports on July 31, 2025

Updated plan of the East Wing from October 2025

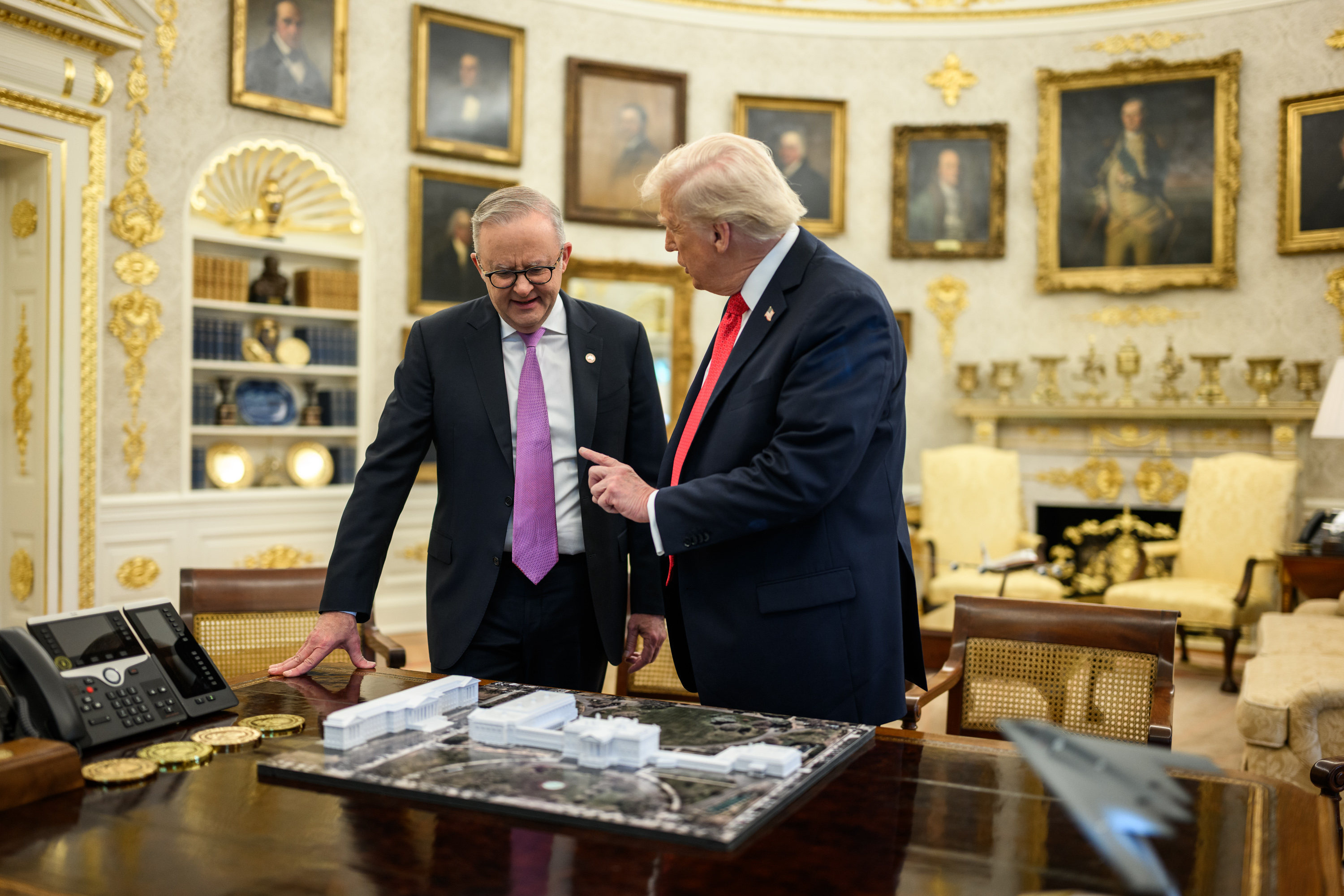
President Trump showing a model of the planned new East Wing to Australian prime minister Anthony Albanese on October 20, 2025

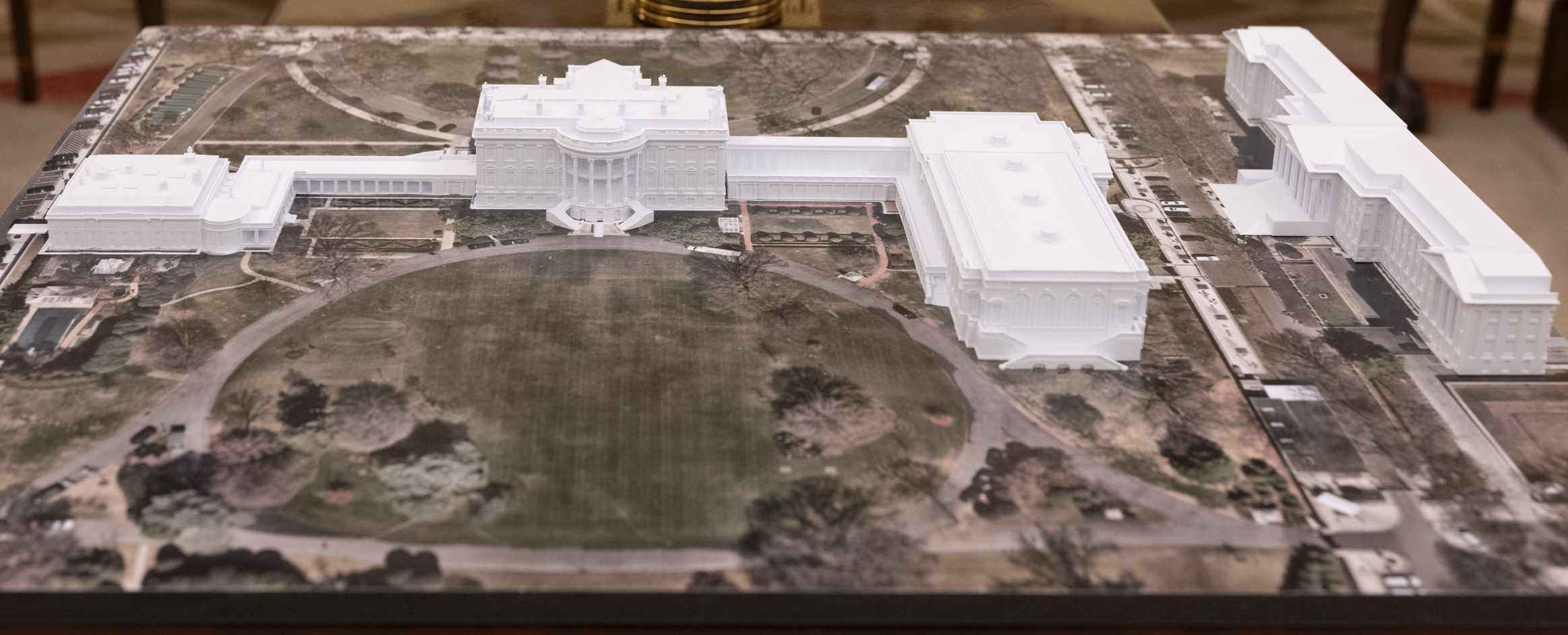
Model of the proposed East Wing/White House State Ballroom (photo released by the White House on October 22, 2025)

Architect James McCrery II, founder and principal of McCrery Architects, was hired on July 13, 2025, by Trump. Plans for the ballroom, to be built alongside a "modernized" East Wing, were announced by the White House on July 31, 2025. Even though the existing building was later demolished, Trump said the ballroom being constructed "won't interfere with the current building", would not be "touching it", and would pay "total respect to the existing building, which I'm the biggest fan of".

In July 2025, Trump appointed three loyalists to the National Capital Planning Commission (NCPC) including his former personal lawyer Will Scharf as chair. The Washington Post reported in August that the project had not yet been submitted for review to the NCPC as required by federal law, and that such approvals often took years. The administration claimed that a 1964 executive order allowed the president to bypass the commission, but after a Post reporter pointed out the legal requirement, the White House said the commission "will be a part of that process at the appropriate time".

A consortium led by Clark Construction was awarded the US$200M contract in August 2025. In September, with plans for the ballroom still not submitted, commission chair Will Scharf clarified during a public meeting of the NCPC that the approval process is only required for construction, not demolition or site preparation work. Initially expected to seat 650, in September Trump said this had been revised upward to 900, and in October he said it would be able to hold 999 people.

In October 2025, Trump fired all six members of the U.S. Commission of Fine Arts which would have advised on the project, and a White House official told USA Today they would be replaced with new members "more aligned with President Trump's America First Policies". The National Park Service completed an environmental assessment in late August that found "no significant impact" but noted that it would likely create "a visual imbalance" with the rest of the White House. The document was not made available to the public until it was revealed in court documents in December. Following its reveal, health experts interviewed by E&E News reported that the plan did not make any mention of asbestos remediation work during the demolition, and former NPS director Jon Jarvis stated there should have been a more in-depth environmental impact statement that would have required a public review period under the National Environmental Policy Act.

Also in October 2025, McCrery resigned after warning that Trump's preferred design would not meet fire and safety codes. Trump had replied: "I am the code." McCrery had also reportedly clashed with Trump over the increasing size of the ballroom and had missed deadlines because his workforce was too small. The White House announced his departure in December without giving a reason for it, saying that Trump had selected Shalom Baranes to pick up the design and that McCrery would move to a consulting role.

Fox News host Jesse Watters said that when asked about his motivations for undertaking the project, Trump explained, "It's a monument. I'm building a monument to myself – because no one else will." Similarly, when reporter Ben Terris asked Trump if he were building a monument to himself, Trump agreed: "That's true. Nobody will do it once I'm gone." Trump also compared the project to China's Great Hall of the People, saying "When I was in China, they have a building – it's called the Great Hall of China. It's a serious hall. This is a very large hall, but we're going to top it, you know?".

The Presidential Emergency Operations Center located beneath the former East Wing was dismantled as part of site preparation. The administration is building a new military complex; the cost to taxpayers has not been disclosed. While this part of the project is top secret according to White House director of management and administration Joshua Fisher, Trump confirmed in October 2025 that "The military is very much involved in this." Several months later, Trump told reporters that "the military is building a massive complex under the ballroom, and that's under construction" and that "the ballroom essentially becomes a shed for what's being built under." In May 2026, Trump revealed that the new bunker will contain six stories, a military hospital, research facilities, and meeting rooms.

The National Capital Planning Commission voted and approved the project on April 2, 2026.

== Funding ==
The government plans to spend at least $927 million on the ballroom and related White House construction projects, to "be covered primarily by private donations", as reported on August 12, 2026, by the Washington Post. The New York Intelligencer described the ballroom and bunker on September 4 as an $800 million project. An earlier internal cost estimate of $600 million had been provided on March 5 by the contractor, Clark Construction, and included the projection that more than half of that amount would be taxpayer-funded; the estimate became public knowledge when the Washington Post reported it three months later.

=== Private funding ===
At the outset, Trump said that he, private donors and large corporations would pay for the ballroom. Initially announced at a cost of $200 million, the cost estimate increased to $300 million in October 2025 and to $400 million by December 2025.

The government had agreed to "[p]reserve the anonymity and privacy of any donor who wishes to remain anonymous, to the maximum extent practicable consistent with law," as stated in a 14-page "Philanthropic Support Agreement" in early October 2025. The Trump administration did not release this document when the nonprofit consumer advocacy organization Public Citizen filed a Freedom of Information Act request for it, but it was released in April 2026 following a lawsuit. In October 2025, the White House released most donor names but withheld some.

As of late September 2026, Trump had raised $333 million from private donors. About 85% of this came in during September and October 2025, and nearly all of the rest was in by February 2026. The names of 57 donors who pledged at least $100,000 each – as obtained by the Washington Post, although several had requested that Trump keep them anonymous – are in the table below. (An additional 10 donors, not named in the table, had pledged at least $10,000.) Despite Trump's past statements that he would partially fund the project, The Post noted that Trump himself was not listed as a donor.

List of pledged donors to the White House State Ballroom
Donor	Pledge Amount	Notes
Adelson Family Foundation	$25,000,000	
Apple	$25,000,000	White House disclosed Oct 2025
Charlie Ergen household & donor advised fund	$25,000,000	Requested anonymity
Nvidia Corporation	$25,000,000	Requested anonymity; journalist reported
Google via John P. Coale Esq. Trust	$22,000,000	White House disclosed Oct 2025
The Laura & Isaac Perlmutter Foundation Inc.	$20,270,000	
Lockheed Martin Corporation	$10,000,000	White House disclosed Oct 2025
Microsoft	$10,000,000	White House disclosed Oct 2025
RHI II LLC (Rocket Companies affiliate)	$10,000,000	Requested anonymity
Palantir Technologies Inc.	$10,000,000	White House disclosed Oct 2025
Comcast NBCUniversal	$7,500,000	White House disclosed Oct 2025
Tyler & Cameron Winklevoss Household	$5,050,000	Cameron Winklevoss and Tyler Winklevoss, co-founders of Winklevoss Capital Management
Altria Group, Inc.	$5,000,000	White House disclosed Oct 2025
Amazon	$5,000,000	White House disclosed Oct 2025
Baszucki Gift Fund	$5,000,000	Journalist reported David Baszucki, CEO of Roblox
BlackRock Charitable Fund	$5,000,000	Journalist reported
Caterpillar, Inc.	$5,000,000	White House disclosed Oct 2025
Cisco Systems, Inc.	$5,000,000	
Coinbase Global Inc.	$5,000,000	White House disclosed Oct 2025
ExtremityCare	$5,000,000	Journalist reported
Jeff Yass DAF	$5,000,000	Journalist reported Susquehanna International Group (founded by Yass)
Kelly Loeffler and Jeff Sprecher Fund	$5,000,000	
Meta	$5,000,000	White House disclosed Oct 2025
Ripple Labs	$5,000,000	White House disclosed Oct 2025
ServiceNow	$5,000,000	
Stephen & Christine Schwarzman Household	$5,000,000	Stephen A. Schwarzman, CEO of Blackstone Inc.
T-Mobile	$5,000,000	White House disclosed Oct 2025
The Paul E. Singer Charitable Gift Fund	$5,000,000	
NextEra Energy	$4,000,000	White House disclosed Oct 2025
Brandon Lutnick Household	$2,510,000	Howard Lutnick
Benjamin Leon Jr.	$2,500,000	
Betty Wold Johnson Foundation	$2,500,000	Of Woody Johnson's family, founders of Johnson & Johnson
Booz Allen Hamilton, Inc.	$2,500,000	White House disclosed Oct 2025
Continental Resources	$2,500,000	
Ed Glazer Household	$2,500,000	Edward and Shari Glazer, son and daughter-in-law of Malcolm Glazer
HP Inc.	$2,500,000	White House disclosed Oct 2025
Isabela Herrera Household	$2,500,000	Daughter of pardon recipient Julio Herrera Velutini
Marissa and Charles Cascarilla DAF	$2,500,000	
Micron	$2,500,000	White House disclosed Oct 2025
Parsons Corporation	$2,500,000	Journalist reported
RAI Services Company	$2,500,000	White House disclosed Oct 2025
Stefan Brodie Household	$2,500,000	Biotech entrepreneur convicted of violating American sanctions on Cuba in 2002
Union Pacific Railroad	$2,500,000	White House disclosed Oct 2025
Vantive US Healthcare LLC	$2,500,000	Journalist reported
Harold Hamm Household	$2,440,000	Chairman of the Continental Resources
Salesforce	$2,000,000	
Benioff DAF	$1,000,000	Requested anonymity
Florida Crystals	$1,000,000	J. Pepe and Emilia Fanjul
Jeff Miller Household	$1,000,000	
Konstantin Sokolov Household	$1,000,000	Private equity investor
Kraken	$1,000,000	
Popolo Family Fund	$1,000,000	organization based in Dallas, Texas, founded and led by Republican donor and former U.S. Ambassador to the Netherlands Joseph Popolo
Vast Space	$1,000,000	
Jason Miller Household	$300,000	
Honest Leadership Coalition	$100,000	
SCS Smith Family Foundation	$100,000	
Tony & Maria Sayegh Household	$100,000	
ArcelorMittal	In-kind donation	Journalist reported
Hard Rock International (USA), Inc.	—	White House disclosed Oct 2025 but Washington Post did not find a donation Oct 2026
Tether Operations Limited	—	White House disclosed Oct 2025 but Washington Post did not find a donation Oct 2026
Paolo Tiramani	—	White House disclosed Oct 2025 but Washington Post did not find a donation Oct 2026 Paolo Tiramani, CEO of the Boxabl construction company (Tiramani says he donated $10 million of Boxabl stock)
Total:	$328,420,000	Total of pledged known/leaked/reported amounts

==== Corporate donors ====
In October 2025, according to Public Citizen, the White House disclosed 21 corporate donors. Journalists identified more. They are identified in the table above.

After reviewing 27 of these corporate donors, Public Citizen found that half received new or expanded government contracts within six months of donating and some were relieved of federal enforcement actions they had faced.

As one example, in October 2025, Trump announced that the ballroom project would be built with a large donation of steel valued at $37 million. Two days later, the White House issued a proclamation which would cut in half the tariffs on automotive steel from a Canadian plant. In May 2026, a senior executive at ArcelorMittal, a Luxembourg-based steel company that uses the Canadian plant to make steel for the US market, confirmed the company had delivered 600 tons of steel, stating they were "pleased to add the White House to the list of iconic American buildings where [their] steel will stand strong for years to come". The previous month, The New York Times had identified ArcelorMittal as the donor.

=== Public funding ===
The White House originally assumed that the cost of the subterranean security structure, as distinct from the above-ground ballroom, would be paid with public funds.

Following the shooting at the White House Correspondents' Dinner held at the Washington Hilton on April 25, 2026, some Republicans argued that taxpayer funds should be allocated for the ballroom construction, claiming that a ballroom at the White House would be a more secure location for such events.

On May 4, 2026, the Senate Judiciary Committee proposed $1 billion for "above-ground and below-ground security features"; these funds were not to be appropriated for "non-security elements of the East Wing Modernization Project". Senate Majority Leader John Thune said that only $200 million would go toward security elements of the physical structure, while the remaining $800 million would go toward "other Secret Service priorities and technology". However, Senate Parliamentarian Elizabeth MacDonough did not allow the $1 billion to be included in the Republicans’ budget reconciliation package, and on June 3, the Senate Judiciary Committee released a new version of the bill that did not propose funding for the ballroom or the bunker. That version passed the Senate and went to the House. Later in June, Democrats and bipartisan critics accused the administration of a "bait and switch". Funds allocated for Secret Service hiring and training under the Big Beautiful Bill were transferred to fund the ballroom, reported as up to $500 million in public funds.

== Design ==

BBC News reported that while the new building would be architecturally similar to the rest of the mansion, it would feature a "lavish interior including chandeliers and ornate columns". The sides of the ballroom will be made with bulletproof glass. The announcement stated that the project will be an addition of 90,000 sq ft (8,360 sq m); despite interpretations that this referred to the floor area of the ballroom itself, an analysis based on released renderings of the plans suggested that the 90,000 sq ft referred to the full floor area of the planned new East Wing, with the ballroom's floor area being closer to 25,000 sq ft (2,300 m^{2}). Trump said the ballroom is planned to be attached to the Executive Residence by what he described as a "glass bridge".

The Hill reported that critics of the project said the ornamentation is "out of touch and ostentatious".

On January 8, 2026, the White House announced that the banquet hall would be 22,000 square feet (2,000 m^{2}) and there would also be offices for the first lady and a movie theater. The following month, the plans revealed that the original 42-seat configuration of the old movie theater would remain when the renovated one would be built. On February 3, on Truth Social, Trump posted a rendering of what the ballroom would look like.

Architects have identified numerous problems with the design plans for the ballroom, including an exterior grand staircase leading up to a side of the building that has no door, columns that would block interior views and daylight, fake windows, and a staircase that would break the symmetry of the White House driveway planned by Frederick Law Olmsted from the 1930s. Following a March 29, 2026 article from The New York Times concerning design flaws, Trump revealed an updated version of the ballroom the next day with some of the issues resolved such as removing the grand staircase that led to nowhere.

== Construction ==
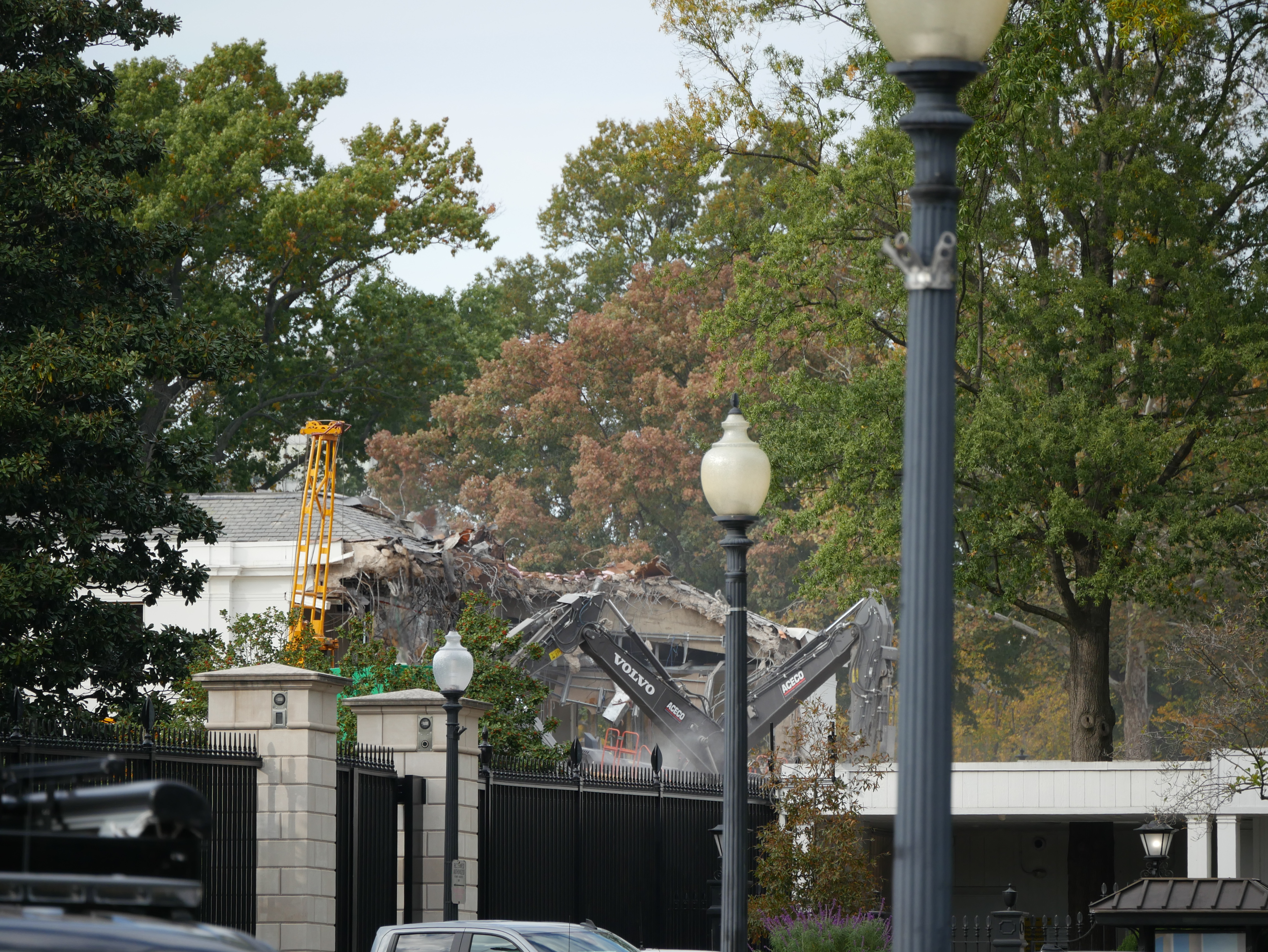
The East Wing being demolished on October 21, 2025

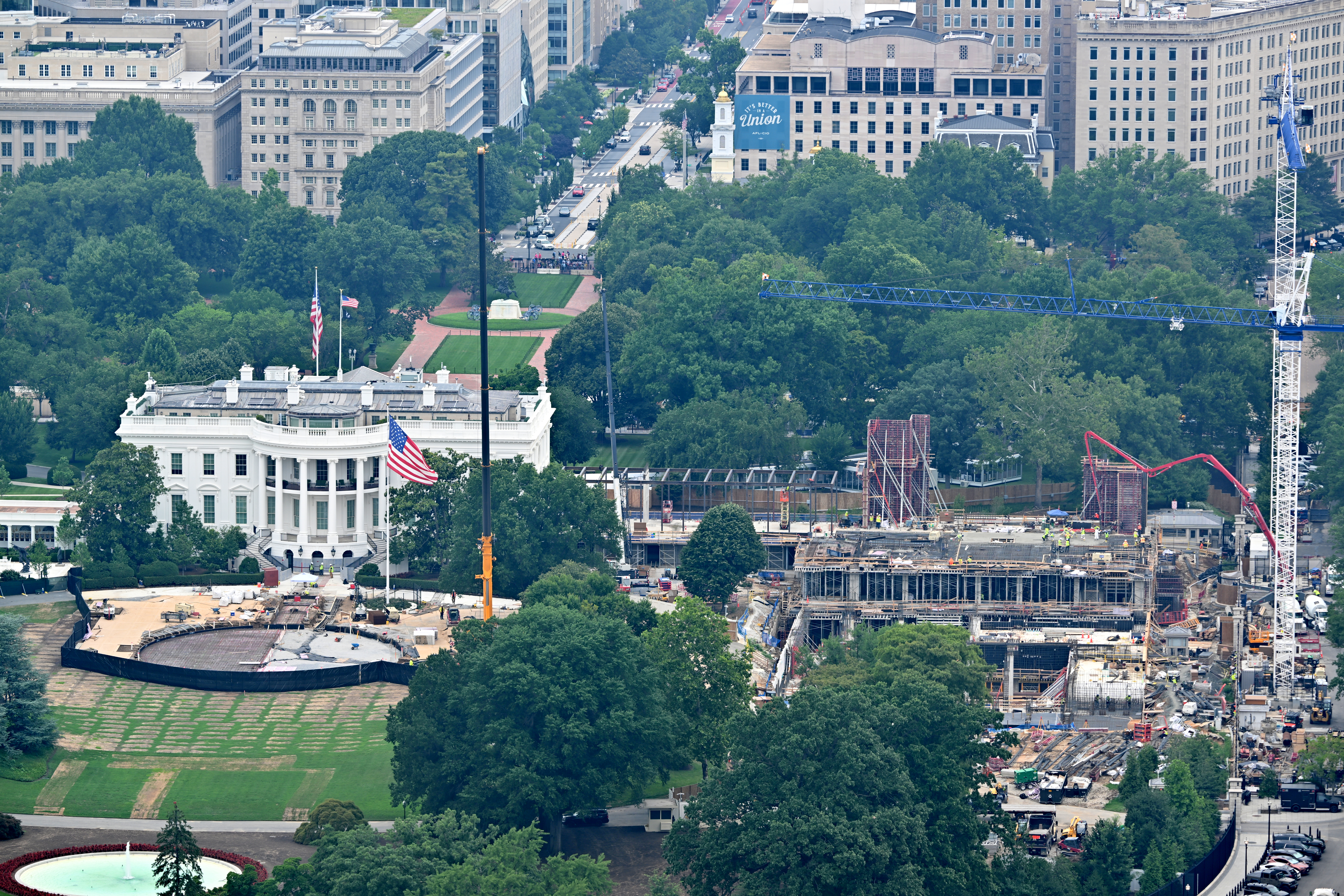
Ballroom and helipad construction at the White House on July 10, 2026

Interior during the topping-out ceremony in November 2026

Construction began in September 2025, continuing during the 2025 United States federal government shutdown that October; a White House Office of Management and Budget memo stated that the construction was being funded by private donors and would not be impacted by federal budget negotiations. Demolition of the East Wing began on October 20. According to a White House official, the "entirety" of the East Wing was to be "modernized and rebuilt". Employees of the U.S. Treasury, which is headquartered next door to the White House, were directed not to take pictures or video of the construction work.

In a July 2025 announcement, the White House said the project would be finished before Trump's term ends in 2029. Experts interviewed by The New York Times described that proposed timetable as "optimistic". Trump said in May 2026 that, while he expected to use the ballroom toward the end of his term, the structure would be "really for other presidents".

Two magnolia trees are believed to have been removed during the construction of the ballroom in late October 2025. The trees had been planted as commemorative trees for presidents Warren G. Harding and Franklin D. Roosevelt in 1947 and 1942 respectively. The Harding tree had previously been in a different location, planted in 1922 by first lady Florence Harding.

On May 15, 2026, Trump announced the scheduled opening date for the ballroom as September 2028.

On June 4, 2026, the U.S. Senate voted on an amendment to block construction of the ballroom, until Congress authorized the project. Although six Republican Senators voted with the Democrats to block construction, the amendment failed 52-47, lacking the required 60 votes.

By late July 2026, the framing of the first floor of the new East Wing had been assembled. In August, Trump officials told the Supreme Court that construction was about "65% complete," to a height of 70 feet in some places and to a depth of five stories underground. No information was provided on how the percentage was calculated. The Washington Post reported that the figure was contradicted by the administration's own records. A confidential agreement with Clark Construction, reviewed by the newspaper, ties payments to the proportion of work completed, so that a project 65 per cent finished should have been paid for to the same extent. Appropriations data showed that the White House budget office had approved $144 million by the end of July, about 24 per cent of the $600 million construction estimate Clark provided in March; the administration's own filing said around $200 million had been spent, or about 33 per cent of that estimate. Measured against the duration of the work, the project was roughly 30 per cent complete, being ten months into a 34-month schedule. Carl Elefante, a former president of the American Institute of Architects, called the completion claim "doubtful".

Hosting a dinner on September 24 for Chinese leader Xi Jinping, Trump offered the approximately 145 guests a walkthrough of the ballroom construction site "as a special treat in honor of President Xi and Madame Peng". He claimed the ballroom was "one year away from completion".

== National Trust for Historic Preservation lawsuit ==
National Trust for Historic Preservation in the United States v. National Park Service
- Court: District Court for the District of Columbia
- Full case name: National Trust for Historic Preservation in the United States v. National Park Service et al.
- Started: December 12, 2025; 11 months ago
- Docket nos.: 1:25-cv-04316 (D.D.C.); 26-05101, 26-05123, 26-05134 (DC Cir.); 26A203 (Supreme Court)

Case history
- Prior actions: March 31, 2026: Judge Richard J. Leon grants a preliminary injunction. Leon delays enforcement of the preliminary injunction for fourteen days.; April 11: In the Court of Appeals, Patricia Millett and Bradley Garcia extend the delay on enforcing the preliminary injunction to April 17 and remand. Neomi Rao dissents.; April 16: Leon modifies the preliminary injunction.; April 17: In the Court of Appeals, an administrative stay of the modified preliminary injunction is granted in a per curiam decision.; August 7: In the Court of Appeals, Patricia Millett and Bradley Garcia affirm the modified preliminary injunction. Neomi Rao dissents.; August 21: In the Supreme Court, John Roberts grants an administrative stay, through the shadow docket, of the modified preliminary injunction pending a further order of the Supreme Court.; August 31, 2026: In the Supreme Court, Clarence Thomas, Samuel Alito, Neil Gorsuch, Brett Kavanaugh, and Amy Coney Barrett, in an unsigned shadow docket order, stay the modified preliminary injunction. John Roberts, Sonia Sotomayor, Elena Kagan, and Ketanji Brown Jackson dissent.
- Appealed to: Court of Appeals for the District of Columbia Circuit

Court membership
- Judge sitting: Richard J. Leon

In December 2025, the National Trust for Historic Preservation (NTHP) sued the Trump administration for failing to observe federal guidelines, after which Justice Department lawyers told the court the construction was justified on national security grounds. On February 26, 2026, US district judge Richard J. Leon decided that construction on the ballroom could continue but said he was willing to consider new arguments the NTHP might present. At a hearing on March 17, Judge Leon acknowledged that, while a president has authority under federal law to make an "alteration" to the White House, to so describe the demolition of the East Wing would require "some brazen interpretation of the laws of vocabulary". On March 31, Judge Leon granted the NTHP's request for a preliminary injunction, temporarily ordering a halt to construction. Lawyers for the National Park Service appealed on April 3.

On April 11, 2026, a three-judge panel from the U.S. Court of Appeals for the D.C. Circuit ruled 2–1 that construction could resume temporarily, with the preliminary injunction paused until April 17. The panel asked Judge Leon to clarify his ruling, which he did on April 16 by explicitly halting aboveground construction of the ballroom. However, on April 18, the court stayed Leon's ruling, allowing construction to resume at least until a hearing.

That hearing was held on June 5, one day after the Senate had voted not to block construction. U.S. Circuit Judge Patricia Millett presented this hypothetical: "If the government decides very quickly to bulldoze the Statue of Liberty ... nothing can be done?” Justice Department attorney Jacob Roth replied: "I think that's right, yes." The court did not immediately rule.

On August 7, the panel ruled 2–1 to uphold the April ruling and preliminary injunction won by the National Trust for Historic Preservation, calling for a halt to all above-ground construction until Congressional authorization is received. The decision was to take effect 14 days later. The Trump administration appealed to the Supreme Court on August 14. Ahead of the injunction, The New York Times reported construction was proceeding "20 hours a day, 7 days a week" with a team of 250 workers in an effort to complete as much work as possible before the ruling took effect. Constitutional law professor Laurence Tribe described the strategy as attempting "to change the reality on the ground so that instead of preserving the status quo, those who rightly invoke the law against what he's doing are put in a position of having to undo something that is already a fait accompli". On August 21, the Supreme Court said that construction could continue while it considered the appeal. It ruled again on August 31 that construction could continue. It did not say whether the construction was legal; it said that the NTHP lacked legal standing to challenge it.

== Responses ==
=== Republicans, Trump and the Trump administration ===
In a video that was retroactively set to private, on April 1, 2026 President Trump states "...They call me king now. Do you believe it? No king. I'm such a king, I can't get a ballroom approved. It's pretty amazing, right? I'm a king. If I was a king, we'd be doing a lot more. I'm doing a lot, but I could be doing a lot more if I was a king."

Trump applauded the construction and highlighted its private funding. The White House Rapid Response team, posting to Twitter, said Trump was following in a long tradition of presidents who modernized the White House. House speaker Mike Johnson also highlighted the many construction projects in the history of the White House and stated, "President Trump's going to have the greatest improvement of the White House in the history of the building." House majority leader Steve Scalise also referenced the many prior renovations and anticipated that the Democratic Party would object to any idea of Trump's. First Lady Melania Trump, though reportedly having expressed concern in private over the demolition of the East Wing, did not release a statement on the construction of the ballroom.

==== 2026 White House Correspondents' Dinner shooting ====
Immediately following the shooting at the White House Correspondents' Dinner at the Washington Hilton on April 25, 2026, Trump cited the security incident as a reason to build the ballroom; he called the Hilton "not a particularly secure building". The following day, then-Acting Attorney General Todd Blanche posted a letter on X calling on the NTHP to drop their lawsuit, citing the shooting, but the NTHP refused.

In the wake of the shooting, numerous Republican politicians, as well as Democratic Senator John Fetterman, showed their support for the ballroom's expedited construction. This included Mike Johnson, Lauren Boebert, Randy Fine, Tim Sheehy, Jeff Landry, Lindsey Graham, Katie Britt, Eric Schmitt, Rand Paul, and Chip Roy. Conversely, several Democratic politicians, including Cory Booker and Sarah McBride, criticized the optics of congressional funding for the ballroom.

Several Republicans subsequently announced their intentions to introduce legislation to continue the ballroom's construction; though Republicans were split on the potential use of taxpayer funds to help fund construction. Graham, Britt, and Schmitt announced legislation to provide $400 million in federal funding, while Paul proposed legislation to move construction forward without any additional funding. Trump soon announced his support for Paul's bill.

On May 23, 2026, in Washington, D.C., a man opened fire in the direction of the White House and was shot dead by police. That evening, on Truth Social, Trump referenced the incident along with the Correspondents' Dinner shooting as support for building a ballroom: "This event is one month removed from the White House Correspondents' Dinner shooting, and goes to show how important it is, for all future Presidents, to get, what will be, the most safe and secure space of its kind ever built in Washington, D.C."

=== Democrats ===
On October 21, shortly after the construction began, former first lady and 2016 presidential candidate Hillary Clinton posted about the construction on Twitter, stating, "It's not his house. It's your house. And he's destroying it." Representative Jamie Raskin of Maryland tweeted a picture of the construction linking it to the War of 1812 when the White House was set on fire by British troops and how Trump was also destroying the White House while fashioning himself as a king.

In May 2026, 150 Democratic lawmakers filed an amicus brief which argued that the project cannot continue because the Constitution gives Congress exclusive control over federal property and that Congress did not appropriate funds for the project. They wrote that routine maintenance laws do not authorize tearing down and rebuilding a major portion of the White House, and that Trump lacked congressional authorization. Democrats frame the unilateral teardown and construction as an authoritarian executive overreach in violation of institutional norms and a disconnect from pressing public priorities like economic affordability.

=== Concerns ===
==== Historical ====
Experts have cited concerns and doubt among historians and preservationists that the construction would damage the historical integrity of the White House. The White House is exempt from the review process of the National Historic Preservation Act of 1966. The building is overseen by non-binding recommendations of the Committee for the Preservation of the White House. Ever since the National Capital Planning Commission (NCPC) was tasked with reviewing federal development projects in Washington, D.C., in 1952, updates to the White House by US presidents have seen voluntary submission of their plans to the NCPC prior to the beginning of construction.

On October 21, the head of the National Trust for Historic Preservation sent a letter to White House officials citing concerns about the new construction and building potentially overwhelming the classical design of the building and argued that construction should pause as the building was a national historic landmark. On December 12, the National Trust filed a lawsuit against President Trump alleging that he violated the Administrative Procedure Act and the National Environmental Policy Act by fast-tracking the construction without comprehensive design reviews, public comments, or congressional approval. The suit aims to force President Trump pause the project until he has submitted the plans to several bodies and Congress for public review and input. The Trump administration replied that the ballroom construction must continue for classified reasons of national security that may be shared with the judge but not with the plaintiffs. In mid-December, the Trump administration told a federal judge that it would submit plans for review by the end of December to two oversight bodies established by Congress, the NCPC and the Commission of Fine Arts (CFA). On February 19, 2026, the CFA appointed by Trump approved the renovation by a vote of 6–0.

==== Ethical ====
Ethics experts express concern over the private funding of the renovation and possible conflicts of interest and attempts by donors to influence the president; the White House did not answer whether a competitive bidding process had been followed.

In September 2025 it was revealed that Alphabet, the multinational technology conglomerate holding company and the third-largest technology company by revenue, owner of Google, was a donor to the ballroom project. Alphabet donated $22 million towards construction as part of a settlement for a lawsuit Trump filed in 2021 accusing the company of violating his First Amendment rights. Aside from Alphabet, the Associated Press reported on October 21 that the White House had not yet fulfilled their promise to publish a full list of donors funding the ballroom project. It did so on October 22. The following day, the nonprofit Asbestos Disease Awareness Organization (ADAO) sent a public letter to the White House requesting records related to asbestos inspection, abatement, and disposal associated with the East Wing demolition, citing concerns regarding compliance with federal asbestos safety requirements and transparency related to potential health risks. In January 2026, ADAO filed a federal Freedom of Information Act lawsuit seeking public records concerning asbestos inspection, abatement, public notification, and disposal activities connected to the October 2025 demolition of the East Wing.

=== Public ===
According to a YouGov poll released on October 22, the majority of polled Americans disapproved of the decision to demolish the East Wing as part of the renovation at 53%, with only 24% of respondents indicated that they approved. In the follow up question about the plans to renovate and build additions to the White House including the new ballroom, 50% indicated that they disapproved of the plans with only 33% indicating that they approved. A joint Washington Post-ABC News-Ipsos conducted October 24–28 found that 56% of Americans polled opposed the project, while 28% approved and 16% were undecided. When the poll was repeated six months later, those numbers were unchanged.

A New York Times analysis found that 98% of the 32,000 public comments on the plan were negative, leading the National Capital Planning Commission to announce on March 5, 2026 that it would delay its vote to April 2.

Paul Goldberger, the former architecture critic for The New York Times and The New Yorker and the author of "Why Architecture Matters", called the design an "enormous, banal box".

== See also ==
- United States Triumphal Arch – Proposed monument in Washington, D.C., United States
- 2026 Lincoln Memorial Reflecting Pool renovation
