= Harold Hamm =

American businessman (born 1945)

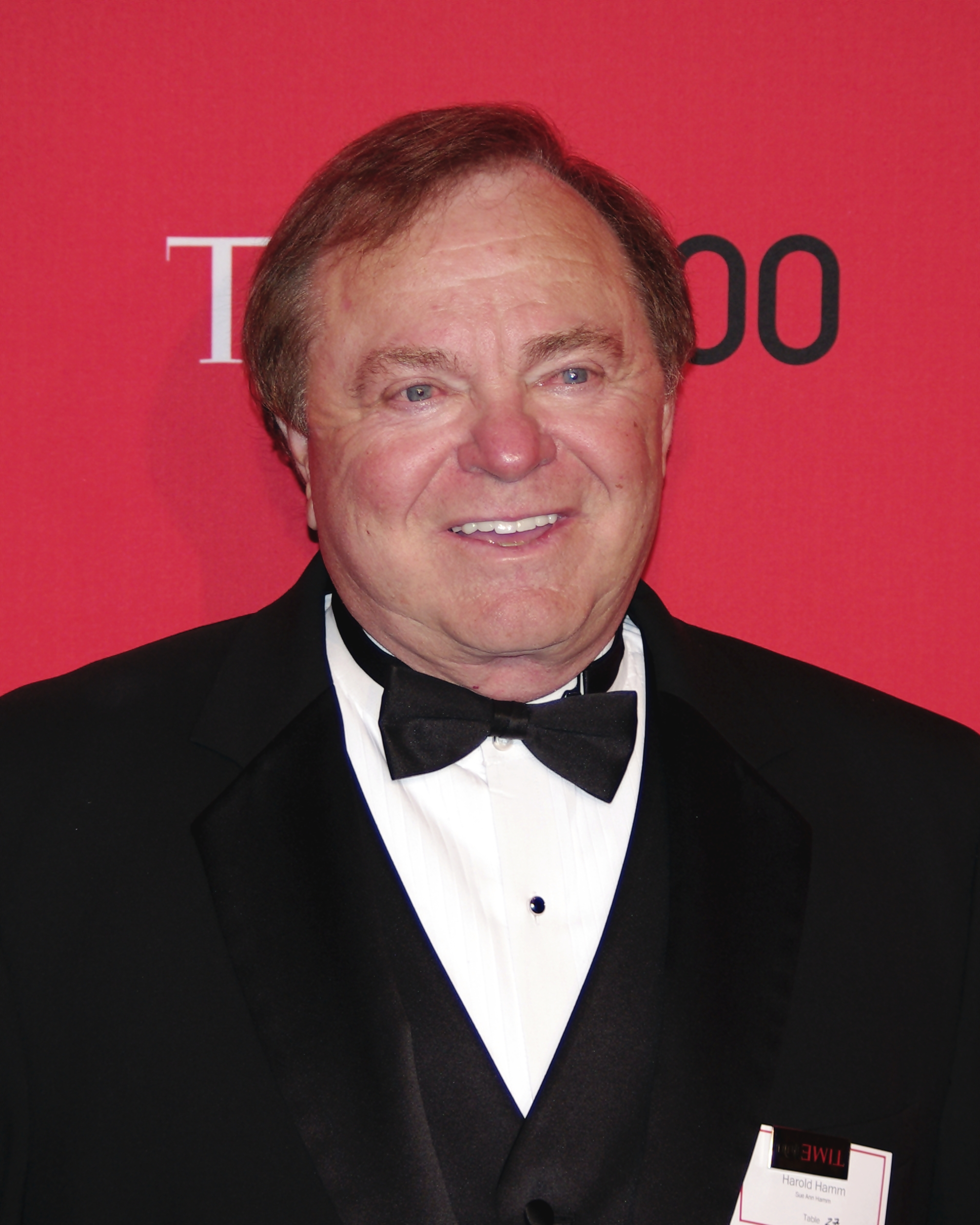
- Hamm at the 2012 Time 100 gala
- Born: Harold Glenn Hamm; December 11, 1945 (age 80); Lexington, Oklahoma, U.S.
- Political party: Republican
- Spouses: Judith Ann (div. 1987); Sue Ann Arnall (m. 1988; div. 2014)
- Children: 5

Harold Glenn Hamm (born December 11, 1945) is an American oil tycoon known for pioneering the use of hydraulic fracking of shale oil resources. As of February 4, 2022, Hamm's net worth is estimated to be US$18.5 billion, making him the 63rd wealthiest person in the world. He is the founder and chairman of Continental Resources.

In 2012, presidential candidate Mitt Romney named Hamm as his energy advisor, and Hamm was a donor to the Romney campaign. Hamm was a fundraiser and donor to Donald Trump's 2016, 2020, and 2024 presidential campaigns.

== Early life ==
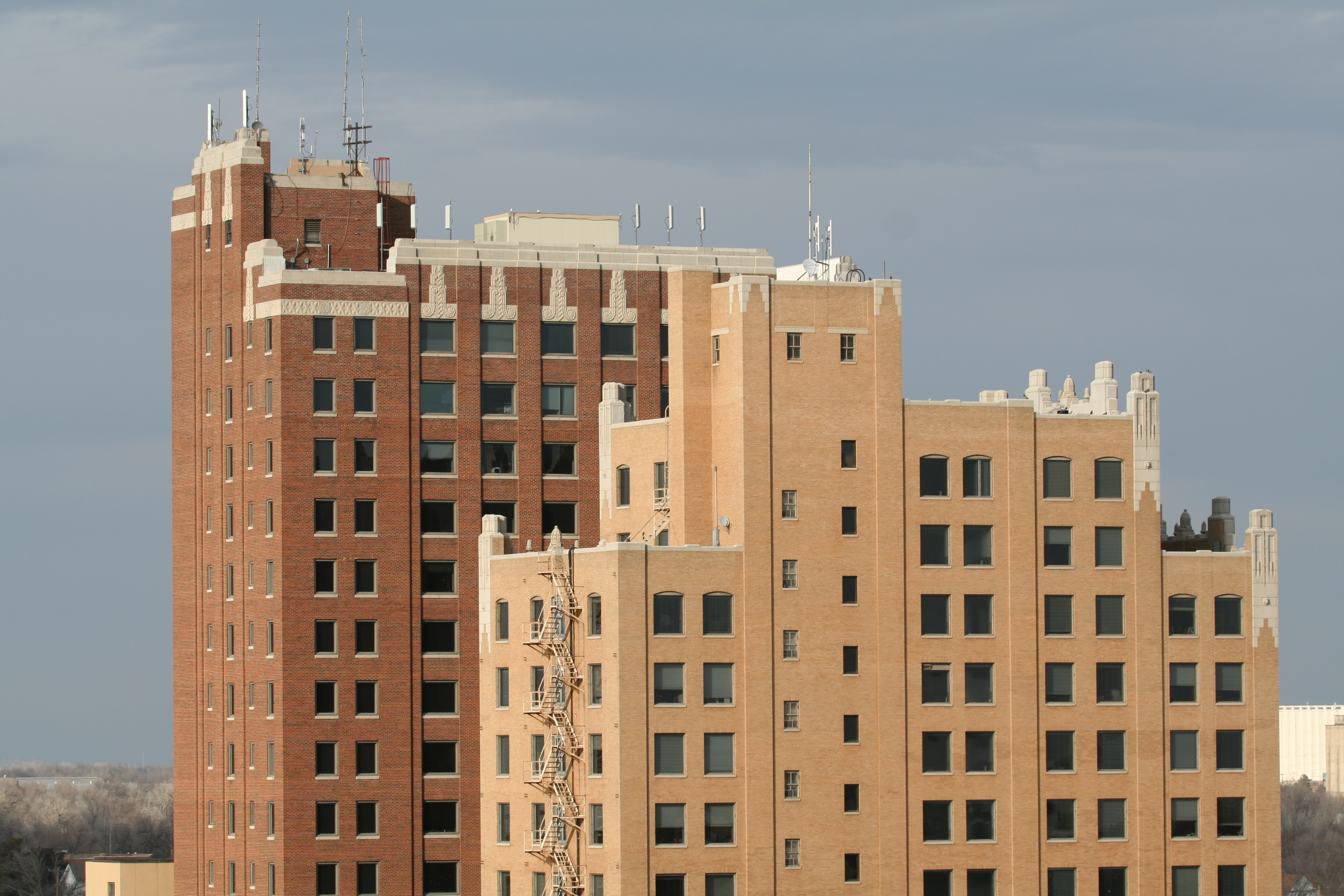
The Continental Towers in Enid, Oklahoma

Hamm was born in Lexington, Oklahoma, the 13th and youngest child of cotton sharecroppers, Jane Elizabeth (née Sparks) and Leland Albert Hamm. At age 16, Hamm started working at a gas station to support his family. He later went on to muck out oil tanks at a refinery. Hamm graduated from Enid High School in 1964.

Hamm started as a "wildcatter", an oil patch slang for someone who drills risky wells in unmapped geological formations, hoping to discover oil. After he struck oil, he decided to complete his college education at Phillips University in Enid.

== Career ==
In 1967, he founded Shelly Dean Oil Company, which would later become Continental Resources. The company pioneered the development of the Bakken oil field in North Dakota and Montana using horizontally drilled wells and hydraulic fracturing. When Continental Resources grew into a major oil producer, Hamm became a billionaire. Continental Resources, known for its use of shale oil, was previously Oklahoma's fourth-largest public company.

In 2007, Hamm was named the Ernst & Young "Entrepreneur of the Year". Hamm was inducted into the Oklahoma Hall of Fame in 2011. In 2012, Time magazine named Hamm one of the "World's 100 Most Influential People." Forbes featured him on its cover in May 2014, publishing the story "Harold Hamm: The Billionaire Oilman Fueling America's Recovery."

== Political involvement ==
Shortly after being named energy advisor to Republican Mitt Romney's presidential campaign in March 2012, Hamm donated $985,000 to the pro-Romney super PAC Restore Our Future. Hamm has been described as part of the conservative donor network of the Koch brothers, Charles and David Koch.

In January 2016, Hamm claimed that Saudi Arabia was unsuccessfully attempting to "flood the crude market at a time of oversupply." OPEC, joined now by Russia, forming OPEC+, ceded the contest, making its first production cut since the 2008 financial crisis, in a bow to the demonstrated price resilience of U.S. shale producers.

At the 2016 Republican National Convention, Hamm criticized the Obama administration's energy policies, claiming that President Barack Obama was "burdening oil companies with greater regulations" so that gasoline prices would spike. Hamm also denounced the Iran nuclear deal struck by the Department of State in 2015, asserting that Iran would be more able to export petroleum and develop an atomic bomb.

In the 2016 United States presidential election, Republican candidate Donald Trump considered appointing Hamm as energy secretary.

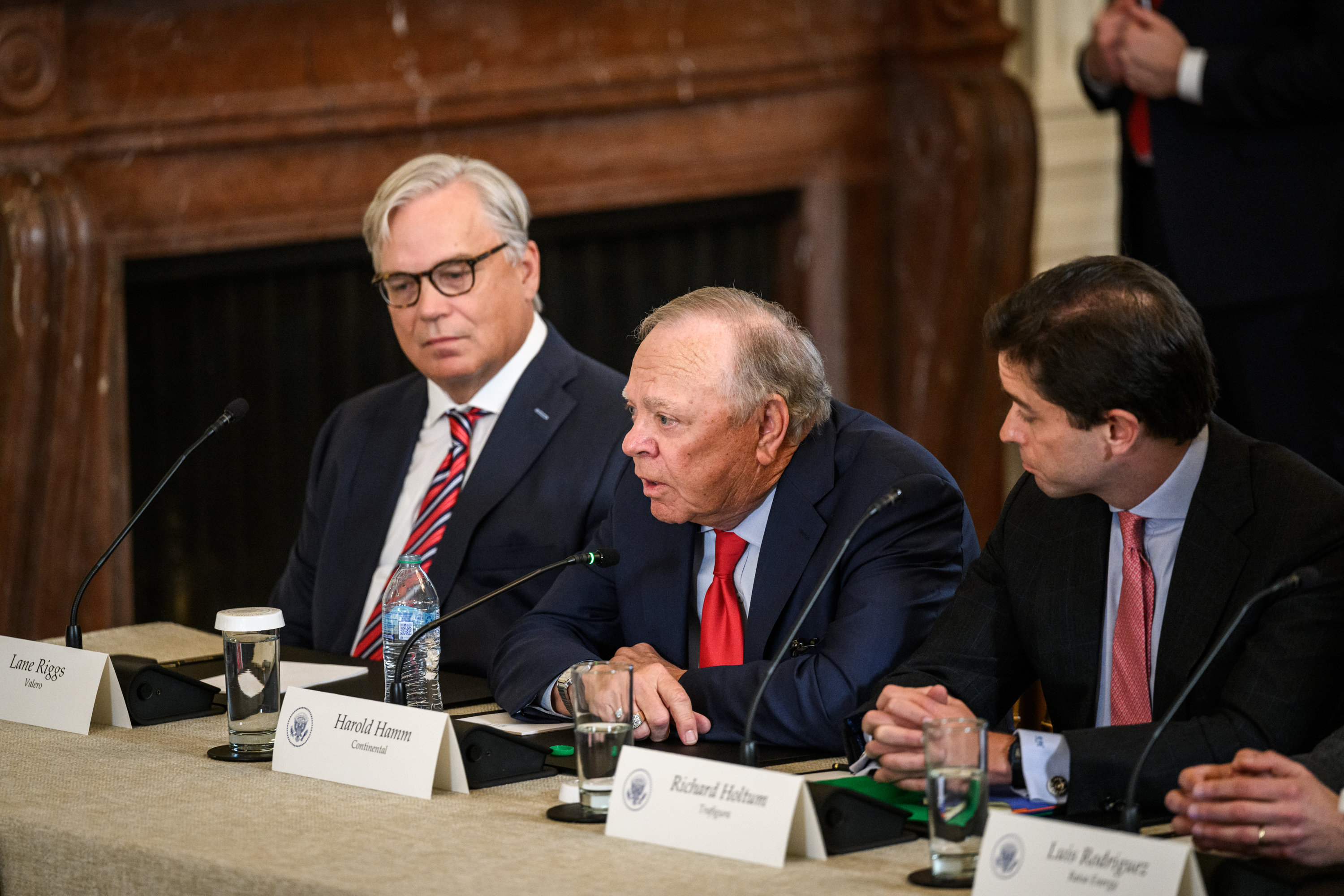
Hamm in 2026

Hamm contributed $320,000 to Donald Trump's 2020 presidential campaign. Hamm criticized Trump for his role in the January 6 United States Capitol attack, saying America needs a "clean slate." However, when Trump became the presumptive Republican nominee for the 2024 presidential election, Hamm fundraised for Trump.

Hamm was a critic of the Joe Biden administration's energy and environmental policies.

In April 2024, Hamm organized an event at Trump's Mar-a-Lago resort where oil industry leaders and lobbyists were invited to donate one billion dollars to Trump's 2024 presidential campaign with the expectation that environmental protections would be curtailed should Trump be re-elected. Journalist Emily Atkin observed that Hamm organized most of the fossil fuel industry fundraisers for the Trump campaign. She also noted his ties with Doug Burgum from the Department of the Interior and with Chris Wright from the Department of Energy. According to DeSmog, Hamm himself gave more than $1.6 million to the Trump campaign, and Continental Resources gave more than $2 million.

Hamm was given a seat at Trump's second inauguration not far from the dais, next to billionaires Rebekah Mercer, Steve Wynn, Robert Kraft, Richard LeFrak, Phil Ruffin, Robert Mercer, and Carl Icahn.

In October 2025, Hamm was named by the White House as a donor to the construction of the White House State Ballroom, a proposed 90,000-square-foot expansion of the East Wing.

In March 2026, Hamm called Oklahoma Governor Kevin Stitt to express his interest in being appointed to Markwayne Mullin's U.S. Senate seat if Mullin resigned.

=== Against renewable energy ===
Hamm has led a decades-long campaign against renewable energy sources. In 2016 he founded the non-profit Windfall Coalition to campaign against state tax incentives for the wind energy industry in Oklahoma. Starting in 2016, the Coalition has claimed tax credits for the wind industry are a burden on taxpayers, linking them to Oklahoma's ongoing budget shortfalls, even though many of those incentives have already been phased out; critics argue the shortfalls were largely caused by falling oil prices, but the Coalition has instead placed blame on wind energy.

The oil and gas industry in Oklahoma, including Continental Resources, continues to receive significantly larger tax breaks—estimated at over $600 million annually—including a reduced production tax rate and rebates for unprofitable wells.

=== In education ===
The Harold Hamm Diabetes Center at the University of Oklahoma was named after Hamm, who has type 2 diabetes. To create the center, the Harold and Sue Ann Hamm Foundation donated $10 million. Hamm is a member of the Global Leadership Council at the Offutt School of Business of Concordia College, Moorhead, MN.

Hamm and Continental Resources donated $10 million to the University of North Dakota's College of Engineering and Mines to create the Harold Hamm School of Geology and Geological Engineering. This was believed to be the largest gift given to the Grand Forks, North Dakota university by a non-alumnus.

On February 1, 2022, the Harold Hamm Foundation and Continental Resources announced a $12 million gift to the University of Mary in Bismarck, North Dakota, to establish the Hamm School of Engineering and endow a "Continental Resources | Monsignor James Shea Chair of Engineering" at the private, Catholic university. It is believed to be the largest philanthropic single gift given to education in the region of western North Dakota and eastern Montana, the footprint of the Bakken formation.

== Personal life ==
Hamm's first wife was Judith Ann; they had three children. They divorced in 1987.

In April 1988, Hamm married Sue Ann Arnall, with whom he had two children, Jane and Hilary. Sue Ann is an economist and lawyer, and has been an executive at Continental Resources. She filed for divorce on May 19, 2012, but Hamm said that he separated from her in 2005. Several media outlets reported that up to half of Hamm's estimated $20 billion fortune could be transferred to his wife, which would become a world record for most money transferred in a divorce. While a judge ruled that his ex-wife would receive $1 billion, she rejected the settlement, seeking a greater sum. According to CNBC, Arnall deposited a US$974,790,317.77 settlement check in 2015 (equivalent to $1,324,034,300.78 in 2025).

Hamm lives in Oklahoma City, Oklahoma, and owns homes in Enid and Nichols Hills, both in Oklahoma.

Hamm has honorary degrees from the University of Mary, Northwestern Oklahoma State University and the University of Oklahoma. He also received an honorary degree from the University of North Dakota.
