= The Yeti (magazine) =

- Editor-in-Chief: Perry Petruccelli (2013- )
- Former editors: Catalina Chiang (2012-2013); Morgan Kayser (2010-12); Thomas Nudi (2011); Heidi Kerr (2009-10); Ryan Jenkins & Ginny Kotzias (2008-09); Ryan Jenkins (2006-08); Kelsey Visser & Alex Joyce (2006); Ryan Brody (2005-06)
- Categories: Journalism; Fiction; Poetry; Interviews; Views; Humor
- Frequency: Quarterly
- Circulation: 5,000
- Publisher: Campus Progress and Florida State University
- First issue: April 2005
- Country: United States
- Based in: Tallahassee, Florida
- Language: English
- Website: TheYetiOnline.com

The Yeti is a magazine published in Tallahassee, Florida since 2005. It is published with the help of Florida State University and Campus Progress and is currently edited by Perry Peruccelli.

== History ==
The first issue of The Yeti was published in April 2005 by a team of Florida State University writing students who noticed the lack of an independent voice in the community. The students established The Yeti as an official organization on the Florida State campus and acquired assistance from Campus Progress soon after.

In Summer 2011, The Yeti brought on a team of new staff members, revamping the image and function of the magazine. A hip hop song was recorded with local musicians S.B.E. and a music video was shot. During that time The Strozier Library at Florida State University began an archive of the physical history of the publication in the Special Collections department.
