= MinnPost =

American nonprofit newspaper

- Type: Nonprofit online newspaper
- Founder(s): Joel Kramer; Laurie Kramer
- Editor: Andrew Putz
- Managing editor: Harry Colbert Jr.
- News editor: Tom Nehil
- Staff writers: Eric Black; Peter Callaghan; Solomon Gustavo; Greta Kaul; Walker Orenstein
- Founded: 2007; 19 years ago
- Headquarters: Minneapolis, Minnesota, United States
- OCLC number: 191956532
- Website: minnpost.com

MinnPost is a nonprofit online newspaper in Minneapolis, founded in 2007, with a focus on Minnesota news.

== Content and format ==
The site does not endorse candidates for office or publish unsigned editorials representing an institutional position. MinnPost encourages broad-ranging, civil discussion from many points of view, subject to the discretion of a moderator.

Content is "politics, government, science, health, culture" and other subjects including the environment, education and the arts. The non-profit model was estimated to save MinnPost about 15% of a traditional newspaper's outlays. The format takes its shape from online newspapers. At first, MinnPost published a print version of about eight pages at the lunch hour to high traffic locations. The print on demand model and print version was discontinued during the newspaper's first year.

The organization is part of a much-discussed trend away from print toward online media. Quoted by Minnesota Public Radio News, Laurie Schwab, executive director of the Online News Association, said in June 2007, 45 percent of the association's 1,100 members "started working at print publications and migrated online".

== Organization ==
MinnPost's initial funding of $850,000 came from four families: John and Sage Cowles, Lee Lynch and Terry Saario, Joel and Laurie Kramer, and David and Vicki Cox.

=== Personnel ===
The founding CEO and editor of MinnPost, Joel Kramer, retired in October 2016. On May 1, 2014, Andrew Wallmeyer joined the staff as publisher, reporting to Kramer. Wallmeyer was CEO until 2020, when Tanner Curl was named MinnPost's executive director. Susan Albright was managing editor until retiring in 2021. Harry Colbert Jr., previously of North News and Insight News, was named as the new managing editor.

Andy Putz is MinnPost's editor. Other news staff include Susan Albright (managing editor), Corey Anderson (web editor), Tom Nehil (news editor), and about 25 journalists.

According to Editor & Publisher, opinion pieces—called Community Voices—are signed and nonpartisan. MinnPost has a news bureau in Washington, D.C.

== See also ==
- Institute for Nonprofit News (member)
- List of newspapers in Minnesota
- Media in Minneapolis–Saint Paul
- Nonprofit journalism
