= Koch network =

Charles G. and David H. Koch and their activities in US politics

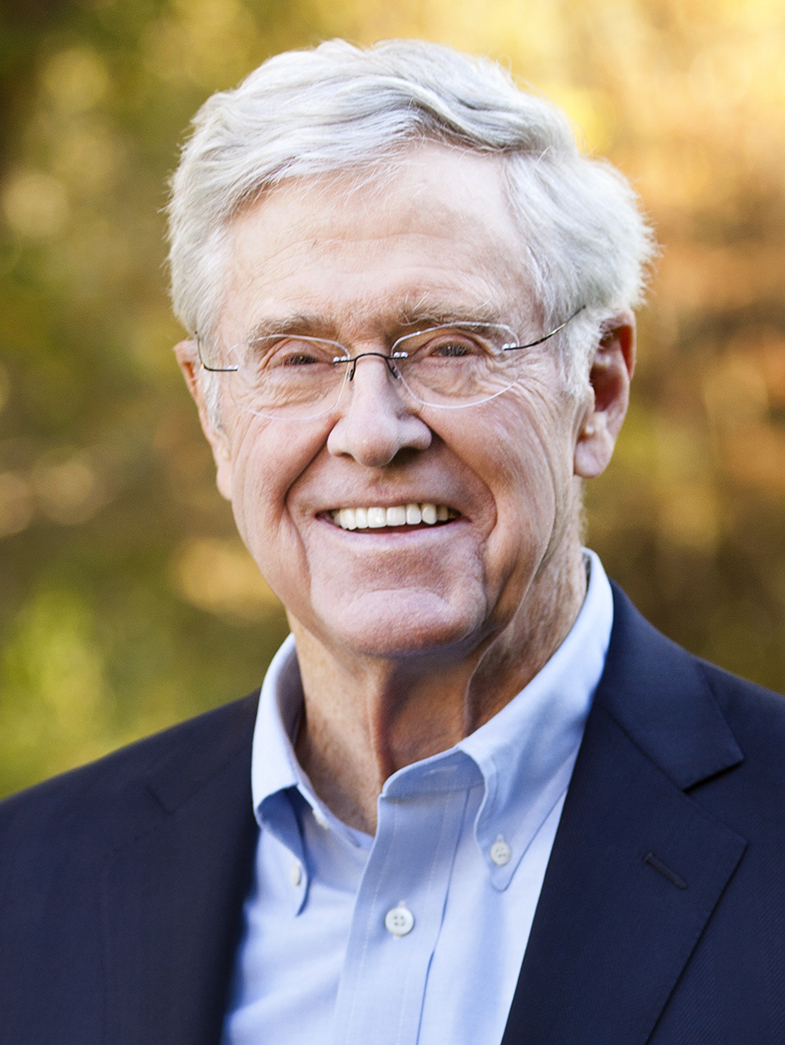
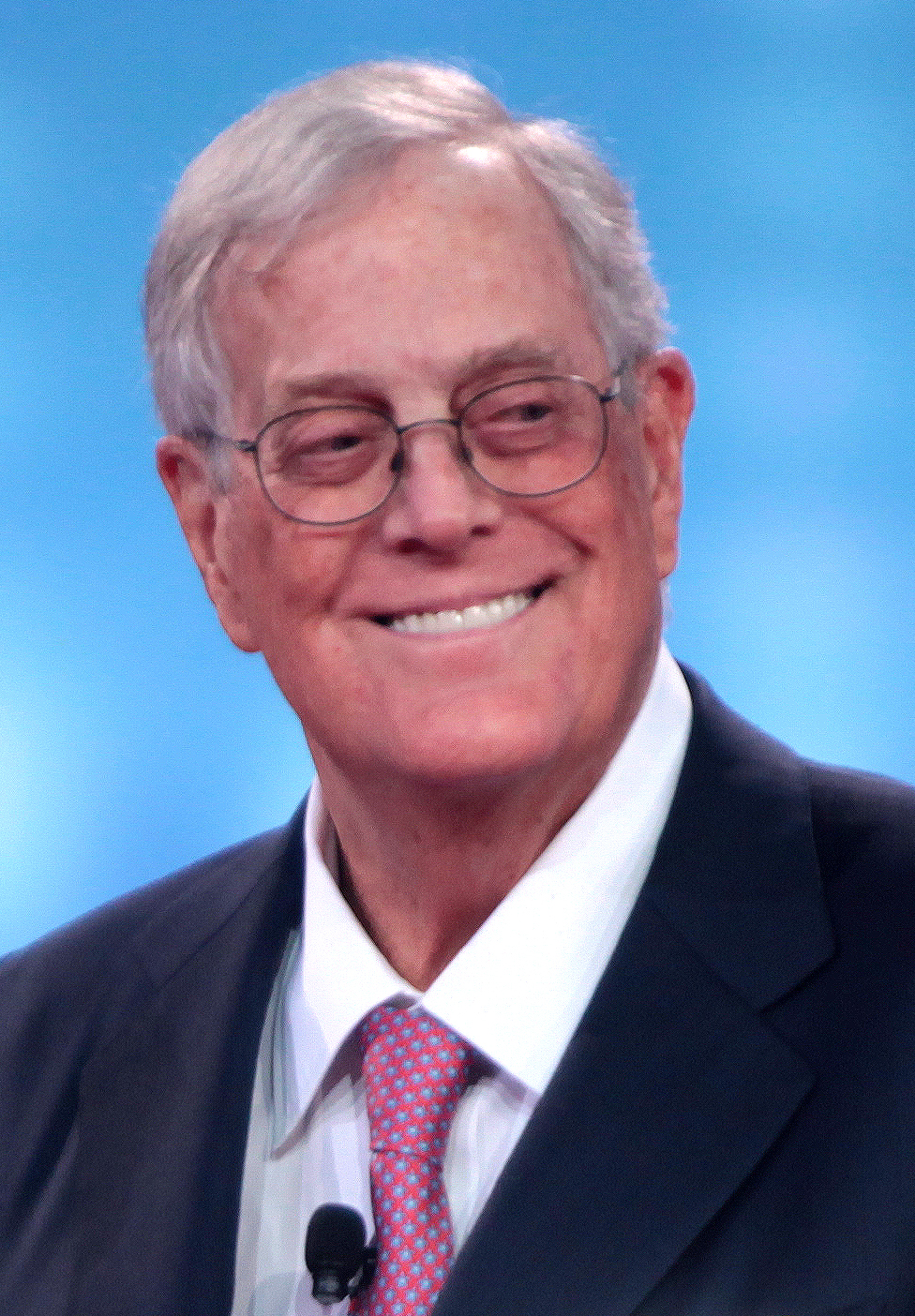
Charles G. and David H. Koch

Charles G. (born 1935) and David H. Koch (1940–2019), sometimes referred to as the Koch brothers, have become famous for their financial and political influence in United States politics with a libertarian political stance, particularly the libertarian conservative or right-libertarian branch most commonly found in American-style libertarianism. From around 2004 to 2019, with "foresight and perseverance", the brothers organized like-minded wealthy libertarian-oriented conservatives, spent hundreds of millions of dollars of their own money to build an "integrated" and "stealth" network of think tanks, foundations, "grassroots" movements, academic programs, advocacy and legal groups to "destroy the prevalent statist paradigm", and reshape public opinion to favor minimal government. As of mid 2018, the media has been encouraged to refer to the "Koch network" rather than the "Koch brothers".

The Koch brothers are the sons of Fred C. Koch (1900–1967), who founded Koch Industries, now the second largest privately held company in the United States. As of 2012 they owned 84% of Koch Industries stock, and as of December 2022, Charles Koch was estimated to have a net worth of $66 billion, making him the 14th-richest person in the world. Fred C. had four sons, but the other two, Fredrick and William, are not involved in the family business; Charles and David bought them out in 1983, and neither are involved with the family foundations, or Charles and David's political or philanthropic network.

The brothers' ideology is libertarian, although they also funded many conservative causes. The late David Koch described himself as a social liberal, and in the early years of their political activity ran for vice president as the Libertarian Party's candidate; however, his "intense" focus was "on economic and fiscal issues", i.e. being fiscally conservative or economically liberal, rather than other libertarian causes, and as of 2014 the millions of dollars both brothers donated to candidates went to Republicans, not Libertarians.

They actively fund and support organizations that contribute significantly to Republican candidates, promote climate change denial, and in particular that lobby against efforts to expand government's role in health care and climate change mitigation. Unlike less patient, shrewd, or deep-pocketed activists, they spent time and money on less visible projects "like influencing policy at the state legislative level". By 2010, they had donated more than $100 million to dozens of conservative advocacy organizations. From 2009 to 2016, the network of conservative/right-wing donors they organized pledged to spend $889 million and its infrastructure was said by Politico to rival "that of the Republican National Committee". Despite its secrecy, the vast reach, massive funding, and political success of the network has gradually raised the brothers' profile and made them a "bogeyman" among many liberals and Democrats.

In May 2019, the Kochs announced a change in direction, described as a "turn away from partisan politics to focus more on goals that cut across ideologies." The Koch network would henceforth operate under the umbrella of Stand Together, a nonprofit focused on supporting community groups. The network emphasized this was "not a branding exercise" and stated that its priorities would be efforts aimed at such anodyne goals as increasing employment, addressing poverty and addiction, ensuring excellent education, building a stronger economy, and bridging divides and building respect. However, others maintain that "Koch-affiliated groups" are still active "at the front lines of our current culture wars" and the Koch Network has also continued its political activities such as lobbying and backing Republican candidates financially in elections.

== Background and history ==
The "Koch brothers" were sons of Fred C. Koch, a founding member of the John Birch Society. He gave a speech in 1963 warning of "a takeover" of America in which Communists would "infiltrate the highest offices of government in the U.S. until the president is a Communist, unknown to the rest of us". According to at least one source (Chris Cillizza), the Koch's domination of American politics, "especially among Republicans", began in 2004 and lasted "through at least 2016". In an April 3, 2014, op-ed piece in The Wall Street Journal, Charles described himself as involved in politics "only reluctantly and recently" and "only in the past decade", starting with the founding of the biannual donor seminars; however, the nonpartisan fact-checking group PolitiFact found the Kochs had "made many campaign contributions prior to 2004", coming to approximately $7 million, in addition to federal lobbying and contributions to conservative ideological think tanks (Cato Institute, the Reason Foundation, the Mercatus Center, and Citizens for a Sound Economy).

In public opinion pieces and other forums, Charles Koch proclaimed his conception of economic freedom as essential to the well-being of society. Believing society so far off course that it was far from sufficient to simply fund candidates for office, the Kochs sought to change the zeitgeist. To that end, they founded and provided sustained funding for an array of free-market and libertarian think tanks and academic research entities starting in the 1970s. These included the Cato Institute (by the end of 1974, Charles Koch had helped found what would become the Cato Institute), as well as the Mercatus Center at George Mason University. On at least two occasions, David Koch voiced support for positions at odds with conservative Republican orthodoxy, such as social liberalism, legal abortion, same-sex marriage, using defense spending cuts and tax increases to balance the budget, and a withdrawal by the U.S. military from the Middle East. At the same time, he also said his "intense" focus was "on economic and fiscal issues", not social issues or "how much military we need", and that on foreign policy, "I'm not an expert ... so my opinion probably doesn't count for very much."

Libertarian candidate

David was the Libertarian Party's vice-presidential candidate in 1980, running on a platform of abolishing Social Security, the FBI, the CIA, and public schools. By being a candidate, Koch took advantage of campaign finance laws exempting him from limits on donations and ultimately "contributed about $2.1 million, more than half the [Libertarian] campaign budget". This gave the candidates enough cash to run advertisements and try to get on the ballot in all 50 states. However, he and running mate Ed Clark won only 1.1% of the vote, and the experience of running for office led him to change course: "I had enough ... [W]e are not a nation that debates issues. We vote on candidates' personalities."

Changing public opinion

By 1984, David had parted company with the Libertarian Party, because, he said, "they nominated a ticket I wasn't happy with" and "so many of the hard-core Libertarian ideas are unrealistic". Charles was also soured on direct electioneering after the effort, telling a reporter that conventional politics "tends to be a nasty, corrupting business ... I'm interested in advancing libertarian ideas". In a 1974 speech to libertarian thinkers and business leaders in Dallas, Charles argued that the most effective response to Americans alienation from free markets and minimal government was "not political action", but "the development of a well-financed cadre of sound proponents of the free enterprise philosophy". He regarded politicians as "actors playing out a script" and turned his focus away from the actors and towards supplying "the themes and words" for the actors "scripts". By 2012, David told Politico that he considered "himself a Republican first and foremost — rather than a Libertarian or a nonpartisan supporter of free enterprise". According to writer Eric Black, the brothers move to the Republican Party doesn't stem from "a change of heart, but one of tactics" since libertarianism "was costly and could be bad for the family business long term".

Charles Koch funds and supports libertarian organizations such as the Cato Institute, which he co-founded with Edward H. Crane and Murray Rothbard in 1977, and is a board member at the Mercatus Center, market-oriented research think tank at George Mason University. In 1985, the Kochs and a new adviser, Richard Fink, formed "Citizens for a Sound Economy", a free enterprise-oriented group that evolved into Americans for Prosperity. In addition to funding think tanks, the brothers support libertarian academics; since 1992, Charles has funded the Charles G. Koch Summer Fellow Program through the Institute for Humane Studies, which mentors young self-described libertarians.

=== 2003 beginning of the network ===
It was in 2003 when the Kochs became disillusioned with mainstream Republican promotion of "certain regulations and new social spending on a Medicare drug program" under President George W. Bush. According to Charles, "we said, 'Gosh, we've got to get involved in politics'." This began the twice-yearly gatherings of wealthy conservative donors known as seminars, the funding and directing of "a full array of political party-like activities, including organizations that could operate in the states and mobilize grassroots activists along with paid operatives". Richard Harold Fink, a former economics professor and former executive vice president of Koch Industries, was described in 2012 by Laurie Bennett as "a longtime associate of the Kochs who oversees much of their influence spending", and by Jane Mayer as "the central nervous system of the Kochtopus".

=== Since 2008 ===
The secrecy was effective enough that prior to the digging of investigative reporters such as Jane Mayer, even many Washington insiders had not heard of them. However, after Barack Obama was elected in 2008, the Koch's led what some called an "all-out offensive" against Obama and congressional Democrats, attracting many other wealthy conservatives to their seminars and "deploying huge sums of secret money" to block Obama initiatives like cap and trade on carbon emissions and health care reform. Since 2010, the brothers have become highly visible, with "journalists and bloggers" reporting on their latest "fundraising goals and election maneuvers", Democrats demonizing them (Democratic fundraising appeals that mentioned the Koch brothers reportedly have generated more donations than those that do not), media interviewing them, and publishing their op-eds.

== Political activity ==
Koch Industries describes itself as being committed to free societies and free market principles and as supporting those who champion these things.

Obama presidency

After the 2008 United States presidential election, when Democrats won the presidency, both houses of Congress, and the collapse of the housing market and threat of a bank collapse made laissez-faire free market economics appear untenable, the Koch brothers led the resistance to the triumphal Obama administration, warning that Americans "faced the greatest loss of liberty and prosperity since the 1930s". Billionaires came forth to invest in the Koch network", nicknamed the "Kochtopus". (Note: the term "Kochtopus" was coined "in service of showing how far-reaching" the power of the Koch network was, but the originators of the term were not liberal or leftist critics, but "paleo-libertarians", who insisted that the network's influence was nefarious "because the DC organizations they fund are too liberal".) During Obama's administration, the Republican Party with the help of the Koch-network "made inroads at all levels of governments". At the state level, they gained 900 seats in state legislatures.

=== Secrecy ===
In a paper analyzing the John Birch Society, Charles Koch "argued in favor" of at least imitating the society when it came to "not widely advertising" who ran the society. Their father is quoted as saying, "The whale that spouts is the one that gets harpooned." As a result, the Koch brothers' "ambitious enterprise" was "largely hidden" from public view. They avoided "all but the minimum legally required financial disclosures". The guest list at their gatherings was "shrouded in secrecy". Guests were admonished to destroy all paperwork, make no mention of the event online or to the media, and make all arrangements through Koch staff, not resort employees. Any audio or visual recording gear (smart phones, tablets, cameras) were confiscated prior to sessions. At least at one gathering, white-noise-emitting-loud speakers were pointed outwards from the event by audio technicians to foil any media attempting to listen in. When one breach of secrecy occurred, "an intense week-long internal investigation" was launched "to identify and plug the leak". Interested in maintaining their discreet influence, Charles and David have donated to non-profit groups who do not disclose their donors. The secrecy abated somewhat starting at the 2015 summer seminar, when some reporters were invited and "allowed to attend some sessions, including those featuring many of the Republican Party's presidential candidates".

=== Donors ===
Based on the one list of donors to the Koch network to surface publicly (from a 2010 summit) Koch donors tend to be disproportionately from the financial or fossil fuel sector of the economy, and to have made or inherited money from private (not publicly traded) companies. Some of the most well-known donors to the network include: Steven A. Cohen, Paul Singer, and Stephen A. Schwarzman. Other prominent and wealthy participants include: Robert Mercer, Ken Langone, Richard Strong, Philip Anschutz, Richard DeVos (1926–2018), Richard Gilliam, J. Larry Nichols, Harold Hamm, and Richard Farmer. (Note: (Other "hugely wealthy, archconservative" families that preceded the Kochs in working to change "how Americans thought and voted" include Richard Mellon Scaife, (one of the heirs to the Mellon banking and Gulf Oil Fortunes); Harry and Lynde Bradley, (money from defense contracts, Harry Lynde Bradley died in 1965 but the Lynde and Harry Bradley Foundation supports conservative causes), John M. Olin, (chemical and munitions company, Olin died in 1982 but his foundation continued funding conservative causes until 2005 when it dissolved), Coors brewing family, DeVos family (founders of Amway marketing and the Richard and Helen DeVos Foundation).))

=== Political contributions ===
In 2008, the three main Koch family foundations contributed to 34 political and policy organizations, three of which they founded, and several of which they directed. As of 2011, Koch Industries' political action committee had donated more than $2.6 million to candidates. The Koch brothers support primarily Republican candidates and in 2010 they supported California Proposition 23, which would have suspended the state's Global Warming Solutions Act of 2006. The brothers pledged to donate $60 million in the 2012 election season to defeat President Barack Obama. According to OpenSecrets, of $274 million in anonymous 2012 contributions, at least $86 million is "attributed to donor groups in the Koch network".

==== Governor Scott Walker contributions ====
According to Mother Jones, Koch Industries' Political Action Committee (PAC) contributed the second largest donation to Scott Walker's 2010 campaign for governor of Wisconsin. It donated $43,000, second in size only to PAC donations of $43,125 from both the Wisconsin realtors and the Wisconsin home builders. That contribution amounted to less than 0.5% of Walker's campaign total because of the limits placed on campaign contributions. Most support for Walker was in the form of expenditures estimated at $3 million from Americans for Prosperity (AFP). Due to Koch's contribution to Walker's campaign, David Koch became a symbolic target for the protests. According to the Palm Beach Post, David Koch was active in Wisconsin politics. Americans for Prosperity reportedly spent $700,000 on ads supporting Governor Scott Walker's changes to collective bargaining.

==== Mitt Romney presidential candidacy ====
In July 2012, David H. Koch hosted a $50,000-a-person ($75,000 a couple) fundraising dinner for 2012 Republican Party Presidential candidate Mitt Romney, which was the subject of liberal and progressive protests. Koch Industries cited the protests an example of what they see as liberal hypocrisy regarding fundraising as these same groups don't protest big money donations for Democratic fundraisers. William Koch, the younger brother of Charles and David, gave $1 million to Restore Our Future, a super-PAC backing Romney. During the 2008 presidential race, David Koch donated $2,300 to Romney.

==== 2016 elections and Donald Trump presidency ====
A group associated with the Kochs announced plans to raise $889 million leading up to the 2016 elections. After the Republican primary, they decided to not donate to Trump's campaign at all, instead focusing on the Congress and Senate races. This included spending "heavily" on get out the vote drives for Republicans in general which helped Trump win "in key swing states". Charles Koch criticized Trump's Muslim travel ban suggestions during the campaign and went so far as to say "it's possible" that Hillary Clinton could be a better president, although he strongly denied rumours that he would actually support Clinton. In June 2018, the Kochs backed a multimillion-dollar campaign organized by three pro-free trade political groups to oppose the First Trump tariffs.

On the other hand, although they "disavowed Trump" and opposed the extremes of his populist movement, so many Koch operatives served in top positions in the Trump administration (Mike Pence, Mike Pompeo, Wilbur Ross, Betsy DeVos, Rebekah Mercer) that Politico dubbed it "Trump's Koch administration". The Kochs have been accused of setting the general tone of Trump and the Trump-dominated Republican Party, helping to "convince voters that Washington was corrupt and broken and that, when it came to governing, knowing nothing was preferable to expertise". A "former employee in the Koch's political operation" stated that "we are partly responsible" for the Trump populist movement nastiness, and added, "We invested a lot in grassroots army that was not controllable."

=== Change in focus ===
In the spring of 2019, the Koch network (made up of a "constellation of groups" and funded by "around 700 like-minded conservatives and libertarians who contribute at least $100,000 annually") rebranded itself from "The Seminar Network" to "Stand Together". In a letter to supporters, Charles Koch outlined the change in mission:

We live in a period of unprecedented progress — economic, social, technological — but not everyone has shared in that progress. While many people have gotten ahead, too many people are falling behind. Our charge is clear: we must stand together to help every person rise In many ways, this new name already expresses who we are. ... But this new name also marks a new chapter — and a new call to action.

According to a description in The Washington Post, the Stand Together Foundation is the name of a nonprofit arm that the Koch apparatus created in 2016 "to support community groups addressing maladies like poverty, addiction, recidivism, gang violence and homelessness" and has as of 2019 "provided grants to 140 organizations". According to The Washington Post, "Freedom Partners, an entity that was once used to air campaign commercials, will cease to exist. Americans for Prosperity will now oversee all political and policy efforts. Groups that cater to specific constituencies, like Libre for Latinos or Concerned Veterans for America, have moved under the AFP umbrella." Koch Industries continued to donate to Americans for Prosperity, giving—as of May 31, 2022—$6.5 million for the 2022 election cycle. The Kochs also told donors and supporters that they would not be involved in the 2020 presidential race. As early as mid-2015, The New York Times reported, "Once known for grim letters to fellow wealthy Americans warning of socialist apocalypse, Charles G. Koch now promotes research on the link between freedom and everyday happiness."

The Kochs were "trading compliments with President Obama". James Davis, a spokesman for Freedom Partners, "In light of the barrage of political attacks and distortions of our record, beliefs, and vision, we are taking the steps necessary to get our story out to the public." At least one critic (Clay Wirestone) maintains "Koch-affiliated groups" are still active "at the front lines of our current culture wars". Explanations for the change include Koch's concern over the success of non-libertarian Donald Trump in the Republican Party and his divisiveness, and/or the success of the goals of the original network.

=== 2024 Republican Party presidential primaries ===
The donor network of Charles Koch announced it would fund a primary challenge to Trump during the 2024 Republican Party presidential primaries. On November 28, the Koch Network announced its endorsement of Nikki Haley.

=== Impact ===
The impact of the Koch brothers' work has been called "extraordinary", unlike what anyone else has done (by Democratic activist Rob Stein). Another more sympathetic observer (Brian Doherty, a libertarian author) argues that while "there are few policy victories you can lay directly at their feet", the Kochs have changed the general political zeitgeist "of valuing free markets" and "libertarianism, in a way it never did 20 years ago". Jane Mayer observes that while there may have been few Koch "policy victories", there were plenty of policy defeats inflicted on their adversaries that they can take credit for. Circa 2015, national opinion polls indicated public support for a government action to address global warming, raise taxes on the rich and close loopholes that benefited them, increase funding for social security, or infrastructure, limits on campaign spending. Inside the beltway of the nation's capital, where the success of the Koch network's election campaign victories meant a majority in congress, there was an embrace of austerity, tax cuts for "job creators", and a dismissal as "out of the question" measures fighting global warming and inequality.

Critics like Mayer also allege that the secrecy of the Kochs and some of their operatives helped create a "conventional wisdom" that America's turn to the right was "a public backlash against liberal spending programs", when in fact out-of-sight, the Koch network was helping this political shift along. The Tea Party movement has been attacked as Koch-funded astroturf—as opposed to grassroots—political movement, with groups like Sam Adams Alliance having "deep ties" to the Koch brothers. Another example being the seemingly spontaneous anti-Obamacare outrage at town hall meetings in summer of 2009, that was assisted by FreedomWorks (connected with the Koch brothers) which "circulating a memo instructing Tea Partiers on how to disrupt" the meetings. (Note: Investigative reporter Lee Fang "discovered that a volunteer with FreedomWorks was circulating a memo instructing Tea Partiers on how to disrupt the meetings").)

== Organizations ==
=== The Koch Network ===
The Koch network is a "tightly interlocked set of organizations" that the brothers and "their closest advisors have developed over time into an integrated political machine". Contrary to the impression of some, it is not an impenetrable "maze of money" funding all matter of right-wing groups; though some organizations outside of the core group have been funded, most of the grants bestowed by its "funding conduits" (such as Freedom Partners), are relatively tiny and not ongoing. According to Kenneth Vogel at Politico, the Koch network has about three and a half times as many employees as the Republican National Committee plus GOP congressional campaign affiliates its "network's operatives and resources" do not work independently of the GOP, but "are closely intertwined" with it. For example, of the first fifteen directors of the different state Americans for Prosperity organizations, almost 70% "had previously held staff posts in GOP campaigns or in the offices of Republican elected officials".

As of mid 2018, the chief "lieutenants" of Charles and David Koch encouraged media to refer to the "Koch network" rather than the "Koch brothers" in their reporting. The network was founded by Charles and David Koch and is made up of "several hundred", (another estimate is about 500) donors who pay a minimum of $100,000 each year, and work to influence American life in a conservative direction. The network has been called "one of the nation's most influential political forces", "a shadow political party, complete with its own field offices and national voter database". In the two years up to 2018 it is estimated to have spent $400 million on "policy and politics", and "millions more on educational and philanthropic initiatives". The network meets twice a year at invitation-only summits, where a seminar is held promoting the political views of the brothers. Although the network is said to have "secretive ranks", it is suspected that members include the founders of many large firms — "everything from Citadel to Franzia wine". When Charles Koch steps down as head of the network, it is "widely expected" that his son, Chase Koch, will take over (with assistance by "several longtime Koch aides"), and that Chase may turn the focus of the network away from partisan politics.

==== Network seminars ====
Charles and David have run fundraising/seminars on conservative public policy and political strategy twice a year since 2003. Only about 17 people participated in 2003, but that grew to around 500 in early 2016. The seminars grew from raising less than $100 million in 2008, under $300 million in 2014, and somewhere between $700 and $900 million for the 2016 election cycle. The gatherings were characterized by great secrecy (participants were routinely urged to destroy all paperwork of the gatherings), commitment to conservative free market ideology, and the wealth of the participants, known as "investors" (in 2015, for example, 18 billionaires were present at a seminar). An example of a seminar at the network gatherings was one entitled "Understanding and Addressing Threats to American Free Enterprise and Prosperity", at the June 2010 event in Aspen, Colorado. The meeting invitation stated that "[our] prosperity is under attack by the current [i.e. the Obama] Administration and many of our elected officials" and "we cannot rely on politicians to [defend our free society], so it is up to us to combat what is now the greatest assault on American freedom and prosperity in our lifetimes." The seminar program indicated that past meetings have featured speakers including Supreme Court Justices Antonin Scalia and Clarence Thomas; Governors Bobby Jindal and Haley Barbour; commentators John Stossel, Charles Krauthammer, Glenn Beck, and Rush Limbaugh; Senators Jim DeMint and Tom Coburn; and Representatives Paul Ryan, Mike Pence, and Tom Price. Some presentations at the gatherings are restricted. Guests may be required to give up their cell phones, media presence limited to only "a handful" of organizations, and photos and videos "strictly prohibited".

=== Impact ===
One 1997 study by the National Committee for Responsive Philanthropy (NCRP) identified twelve American foundations which have had a key influence on American public policy since the 1960s via their support for The Heritage Foundation, the American Enterprise Institute, and the Cato Institute. Three of these are Koch Family Foundations (the Charles G. Koch Charitable Foundation, the Claude R. Lambe Charitable Foundation, and the David H. Koch Charitable Foundation). The NCRP has also stated that it is not surprising that the philanthropic giving directed by the Koch brothers often goes to "that do research and advocacy on issues that impact the profit margin of Koch Industries", the conservative non-profits the network funds working to promote lower taxes and less regulation favorable to that bottom line. In 2017, historian Nancy MacLean found that several Koch Family Foundations had significantly nurtured the libertarian movement in the United States.

=== Family foundations ===
The Koch family foundations began in 1953 with the establishment of the Fred C. and Mary R. Koch Foundation. In 1980, Charles Koch established the Charles G. Koch Charitable Foundation, with the stated purpose of advancing social progress and well-being through the development, application and dissemination of "the Science of Liberty". David Koch established the David H. Koch Charitable Foundation. The two brothers' foundations have provided an estimated $1.5 billion to a variety of causes and institutions including public television, medical research, higher education, environmental stewardship, criminal justice reform and the arts. Charles Koch and his wife were trustees of the Claude R. Lambe Charitable Foundation, as directed by Claude R. Lambe. The foundation distributed more than $27 million of its assets between 1997 and 2009. The Claude. R. Lambe Charitable Foundation was formally dissolved in 2013.

=== Think tanks and political organizations ===
Among the think tanks and public policy organizations Charles and David Koch have been involved in, and/or provided funding to include: the Cato Institute (they provided the initial funding), the Federalist Society (they are key donors). They also support, or are members of, the Mercatus Center, the Institute for Humane Studies, the Institute for Justice, the Institute for Energy Research, The Heritage Foundation, the Manhattan Institute, the Reason Foundation, the George C. Marshall Institute, the American Enterprise Institute, the Fraser Institute, and the Foundation for Accountability and Civic Trust. As of 2015, David Koch sat on the board of directors of the Cato Institute, the Reason Foundation and the Aspen Institute. A 2013 study by OpenSecrets said that nonprofit groups backed by a donor network organized by Charles and David Koch raised more than $400 million in the 2011–2012 election cycle.

==== Citizens for a Sound Economy ====
Citizens for a Sound Economy was co-founded by David Koch in 1985. According to the Center for Public Integrity, the Koch Brothers donated a total of $7.9 million between 1986 and 1993. In 1990, the brothers created the spinoff group Citizens for the Environment. In 2004, Citizens for a Sound Economy was renamed FreedomWorks, while its affiliated Citizens for a Sound Economy Foundation became Americans for Prosperity (AFP). Since then, the Koch brothers have given more than one million dollars to AFP.

==== Americans for Prosperity ====
The Americans for Prosperity Foundation has been called the Koch brothers' "main political arm", "primary political advocacy group", "flagship political operation", As of 2016, it had "paid staff in 34 states and contact lists for millions of conservative activists nationwide". David Koch was the top initial funder ("by far the single largest contributor") of the Americans for Prosperity Foundation. At AFP's 2009 annual summit meeting, David Koch said, "Five years ago, my brother Charles and I provided the funds to start the Americans for Prosperity, and it's beyond my wildest dreams how AFP has grown into this enormous organization." AFP is the political arm of the Americans for Prosperity Foundation, for which David Koch served as chairman of the board of trustees. Americans for Prosperity created Patients United Now, which advocated against a single-payer health care system during the 2009-2010 healthcare reform debate. Both FreedomWorks and Americans for Prosperity have provided support for the Tea Party movement. AFP spent $45 million in the 2010 election.

==== Cato Institute ====
The Cato Institute is an American libertarian think tank headquartered in Washington, D.C. It was founded as the Charles Koch Foundation in 1974 by Ed Crane, Murray Rothbard, and Charles Koch. Following the 2011 death of William Niskanen, the chairman of the Cato Institute, Charles and David Koch reportedly made an effort to procure the shares of that institute held by Niskanen's widow, "arguing that they were not hers to hold". Their efforts were criticized by some at the institute, including the institute's president Ed Crane, who in an email to staff stated that the Kochs were "in the process of trying to take over the Cato Institute". The brothers issued a statement denying any wrongdoing and stated they "never asserted that Cato should be directly by, or at the whim of, any other organization, or that they should aspire to advocate the way AFP does". In June 2012, Cato and the brothers reached an agreement. Crane stepped down and was replaced by John A. Allison IV; the Kochs withdrew two lawsuits.

==== Freedom Partners ====
Freedom Partners gave grants worth a total of $236 million to conservative organizations, groups like the Tea Party Patriots and organizations which opposed the Affordable Care Act prior to the 2012 election. Freedom Partners financed the socially conservative group Concerned Women for America, a leading opponent of same-sex marriage in the United States A majority of Freedom Partners board of directors is made up of long-time employees of the Koch brothers.

==== Concerned Veterans for America ====
The Koch network funds the nonprofit group Concerned Veterans for America. The group favors privatizing the Veterans Administration, or as the organization describes it, converting the VA into an "independent, government-chartered nonprofit corporation". The goal is opposed by Veterans Service Organizations such as the American Legion and the Paralyzed Veterans of America.

==== Other groups ====
The Kochs donated more than $17 million between 1997 and 2008 to various groups including the Competitive Enterprise Institute. It describes itself as offering information on issues including, among others, energy, environment, biotechnology, pharmaceutical regulation, chemical risk, and telecommunications. The Kochs have donated millions of dollars via organizations they fund to the National Federation of Independent Business. In 2013 "NFIB and its affiliated groups received $2.5 million from Freedom Partners Chamber of Commerce, a conservative advocacy group with deep ties to the Koch empire. Of the five men that sit on the group's board, four are current or former employees of Koch companies and one is a friend of Charles Koch's." Other groups the Kochs have supported include:

- "Generation Opportunity", a former center-right youth mobilization effort;
- "The LIBRE Initiative" to engage Hispanics to support low taxes and less business regulation, or "to empower Hispanics" and advance "liberty, freedom and prosperity";
- Themis/i360, which collects and analyzes voter data, maintaining "a database of over 250 million 18+ adults, including the 190 million who are registered to vote"; and
- Aegis Strategic, which recruits and trains conservative candidates such as now Senator from Iowa, Joni Ernst.

=== Educational grants ===
Between 2007 and 2012, Koch family foundations reportedly "contributed $30.5 million to 221 colleges and universities". The Charles Koch Foundation (and in the case of Kansas schools, the Fred and Mary Koch Foundation) provides grants as of 2013, to nearly 270 U.S. colleges and universities for "projects that explore how the principles of free enterprise and classical liberalism promote a more peaceful and prosperous society".

In 2011, the Charles G. Koch Foundation made a grant of $1.5 million to Florida State University in exchange for allowing the foundation, via an advisory committee, to approve hiring decisions in the university's economics department for a program that promotes "political economy and free enterprise". The FSU student senate introduced a resolution protesting the Koch's "undue influence on academics as established by the current agreement between the Charles G. Koch Charitable Foundation and the FSU Economics department". In response, John Hardin, who is a program officer with the Charles Koch Foundation, stated that, "when we support a school's initiative, it is to expand opportunity and increase the diversity of ideas available on campus."

In 2014, the brothers made a $25 million grant to the United Negro College Fund. After the fund's president also appeared at a summit held by the brothers, the American Federation of State, County and Municipal Employees, a major labor union, providing $50,000 annually ended its support for the fund in protest.

== Issues and policy ==
=== Climate change and use of fossil fuels ===
The Koch brothers have played an active role in opposing climate change legislation, particularly in preventing the passing of legislation at the start of the Obama administration when there was widespread consensus on its need (in institutions such as U.S. Department of Defense, the American Association for the Advancement of Science, and a U.S. National Security Strategy report), and when control of Congress and the Presidency was in the hands of the party (the Democrats) and president who had pledged to pass climate change legislation, although both parties' candidates had "spoken of the importance of addressing global warming". The Koch brothers and the other fossil fuel industry magnates (Corbin Robertson Jr., Harold Hamm, Larry Nichols, Philip Anschutz, etc.) that formed the core of the Koch donor network are thought to have been particularly alarmed by legislation that would have cut carbon emissions, so they stayed within the range thought necessary to prevent "irreversible global damage to life on earth". Doing so would have meant 80% of the known coal, oil and gas reserves owned by industry would have to "stay unused in the ground"—a potentially "catastrophic" financial loss to these fossil fuel titans according to climate scientists and journalist Jane Mayer.

The Koch brothers and their network fought global warming legislation (such as the market-based regulation of carbon emissions proposed by the Obama administration known as "cap and trade") both through direct political activity ("massively increasing" its lobbying of congress, and supporting political candidates who opposed climate action); and through working to sow doubt among the public about the science of global warming. This was important because in 2003, before the doubt campaign took off, an overwhelming majority of both Democrats (68%) and Republicans (65%) thought global warming was caused by pollution from human activities; it was effective because by 2021 only 32% of Republicans agreed, although 88% of Democrats did.

According to Kert Davies, the founder and director of Climate Investigations Center, "you'd have a carbon tax, or something better, today, if not for the Kochs. They stopped anything from happening back when there was still time." In January 2011, Rolling Stone magazine included the Koch brothers on its list of the top twelve people blocking progress on global warming. In 2011, Los Angeles Times reporter Margot Roosevelt called the Koch Brothers "the nation's most prominent funders of efforts to prevent curbs on fossil-fuel burning". In 2011 and 2012, Koch Industries Public Sector LLC (the lobbying arm of Koch Industries), pushed for the Energy Tax Prevention Act, which would have prevented the Environmental Protection Agency (EPA) from regulating greenhouse gases according to the Investigative Reporting Workshop at American University

Regarding public opinion, over $500 million was spent on a "campaign to manipulate and mislead the public about the threat posed by climate change" between 2003 and 2010 according to researcher Robert Brule. Although much of the funding was untraceable (often passed through Donors Trust or Donors Capital Fund, which are not required to disclose their donors), 140 conservative foundations (many if not all affiliated with the Koch network), gave 5299 grants to 91 different non-profit organizations.

The environmentalist group Greenpeace writes that organizations that the Koch brothers help fund such as Americans for Prosperity, The Heritage Foundation, the Cato Institute, and the Manhattan Institute were active in questioning global warming. Through Americans for Prosperity, the Koch brothers influenced more than 400 members of Congress to sign a pledge to vote against "legislation relating to climate change that includes a net increase in government revenue". Political scientist Theda Skocpol describes 2007 as the "turning point" in the fight for global warming denial: "Climate denial got disseminated deliberately and rapidly from think tanks tomes to the daily media fare of about 30 to 40% of the U.S. populace." This involved "saturation coverage" by conservative media, portraying climate scientists as "swindler pushing a radical, partisan, anti-American agenda".

Among the climate change research projects funded in part by Koch brother affiliated groups were the Berkeley Earth Surface Temperature project, and one by climate change denier Willie Soon. The Koch Foundation was a major funder of the Berkeley Earth, an effort started by two scientists -- Richard A. Muller (a UC Berkeley physicist) and Elizabeth Muller—who "found merit in some of the concerns of climate skeptics", and believed global warming climate data was flawed. The Mullers organized a group of scientists in early 2010 to "reanalyze the Earth's surface temperature record". Unfortunately for the Koch's campaign, Richard Muller later reversed his views, issuing a statement in mid-2012 supporting scientific consensus.

The Charles G. Koch Foundation gave the Smithsonian Institution two grants totaling $175,000 in 2005/6 and again in 2010 to support research of climate change denier Willie Soon. The foundation helped finance a 2007 analysis suggesting that climate change was not a threat to the survival of polar bears, which was questioned by other researchers, but nonetheless "echoed throughout the Koch network". Jane Mayer reports that Soon accepted "more than $1.2 million from the fossil fuel industry from 2005 to 2015 ... without disclosing it". Soon has stated that he has "never been motivated by financial reward in any of my scientific research".

At the state level, Koch Industries (unsuccessfully) supported efforts in 2010 to roll back emission regulations in California. The Koch brothers' Lambe Foundation has donated to the American Energy Alliance, an offshoot of the Institute for Energy Research that promotes oil and gas energy exploration and production and looser government regulations to encourage them. In March 2015, the general counsel of Koch Industries, in a letter responding to a request from three Senate Democrats, wrote that, "The activity efforts about which you inquire, and Koch's involvement, if any, in them, are at the core of the fundamental liberties protected by the First Amendment to the United States Constitution", and declined to cooperate with the senators' inquiry into the funding of researchers who deny climate change. The Kochs have also funded efforts to stop the growth of solar power.

=== Patient Protection and Affordable Care Act ===
Koch brothers-funded groups including Americans for Prosperity, Pacific Research Institute, Center to Protect Patient Rights, and Generation Opportunity opposed the 2010 Patient Protection and Affordable Care Act (PPACA) commonly called Obamacare, favoring a free-market approach. Koch brothers-funded Americans for Prosperity and Generation Opportunity ran more than $3 million worth of advertisements opposing the Affordable Care Act, including a series of ads in which Uncle Sam was depicted as a "creepy" doctor. The ads are directed at women and young adults and are designed to "undermine confidence" and to dissuade younger people from enrolling in health care coverage through exchanges which opened October 1, 2013. In October 2013, the Americans for Prosperity group began a campaign to oppose "Obamacare" in the state of Virginia.

=== Criminal justice reform ===
The Koch brothers have advocated reform of the United States' criminal justice system. In 2011, Koch Industries received a "Defender of Justice award" from the National Association of Criminal Defense Lawyers in recognition of their financial support for providing low-income defendants with competent legal representation. The Kochs stepped up their work on the issue in 2015, partnering with left-leaning groups to promote reforms to reduce incarceration in the United States. The Kochs aligned with President Barack Obama in heading criminal justice reform, citing poor conditions and an outdated system. In addition to the president, the Kochs have partnered with groups such as the ACLU, the Center for American Progress, Families Against Mandatory Minimums, the Coalition for Public Safety, and the MacArthur Foundation. The Kochs, along with their partners, seek to aid those suffering from systemic overcriminalization and overincarceration, who are generally from low-income and minority communities. Another goal for the Kochs' criminal justice reforms is to reduce recidivism and diminish barriers faced by rehabilitated citizens seeking reintroduction into the work force and society. The Kochs and the ACLU are also invested in putting an end to Asset forfeiture by law enforcement, which deprives persons of often the bulk of their private property.

In July 2015, after the rare show of bipartisanship, President Obama praised the Kochs' work on the issue. Similarly, civil rights activist Anthony Van Jones lent a comparable praise towards the Kochs' actions. Although critics have called the announcement a public relations stunt on behalf of the Kochs in the midst of media attacks, several media outlets noted that Charles Koch had been making substantial donations for criminal justice reform for almost a decade before the news was made public. Among the reforms are a push for further mens rea requirements, meaning criminal intent must be proven to establish fault. The Justice Department noted that some white-collar crimes, including food safety violations and corporate pollution, would become more difficult to prosecute; however, the Justice Department has been accused of over-criminalizing persons who have committed minor infractions without intent or even knowledge of the law. In essence, the reforms could potentially overturn Ignorantia juris non excusat statutes.

In early 2018, the Koch network continued its mission to "promote criminal justice reform and anti-recidivism programs" through discussions with the Department of Justice in Washington, and initiatives like the Safe Streets and Second changes program. While many see Attorney General Jeff Sessions as a potential roadblock to the Koch network's goal of broader criminal justice reform in the United States, Mark Holden, vice president and general counsel for Koch Industries, notes that they are making inroads with the Attorney General, starting with prison reform. The Koch network, at their 2018 meeting the launch of Safe Streets and Second Chances, announced a $4 million pilot project designed to shift the American criminal justice system from punishment to prioritizing rehabilitation. The initiative, led by Koch Industries in conjunction with the Texas Public Policy Foundation and Right on Crime, will launch in Florida, Louisiana, Texas, and Pennsylvania. Researchers will develop "individualized re-entry" plans for over 1,000 participants at 8 sites and then analyze the results.

=== COVID-19 pandemic ===
The Koch-funded American Institute for Economic Research sponsored the Great Barrington Declaration, a statement that advocates an alternative, risk-based approach to the COVID-19 pandemic that involves "Focused Protection" of those most at risk and seeks to avoid or minimize the societal harm of the COVID-19 lockdowns. The Charles Koch Institute is a "major benefactor" of the Independent Women's Forum, an American conservative non-profit organization focused on economic policy issues of concern to women, which opposed efforts to combat the coronavirus through mask mandates in schools. The group circulated a template letter to its members encouraging them to personalize and mail it to "your own school superintendents and administrators, principals, and teachers!". Among other things the proposed letter asserted that "young kids do not significantly spread COVID either" and claimed that "common sense" teaches that requiring masks in school may lead to anxiety, depression, decreases in socialization skills, and increases in tooth decay in children.

During the COVID-19 pandemic, the Koch network funded several research projects that expressed support for lockdowns and similar Non-pharmaceutical intervention (epidemiology) policies. In March 2020 the Koch-funded Mercatus Center at George Mason University awarded an Emergent Ventures grant to Neil M. Ferguson of Imperial College London for "good policy thinking" in support of his COVID-19 epidemiological model. Ferguson's model proved highly influential in inducing public health officials to adopt lockdown policies worldwide. A grant from the Charles Koch Foundation funded a National Bureau of Economic Research study finding that California's shelter-in-place style lockdown policy "led to as many as 1,661 fewer COVID-19 deaths" in the spring of 2020. A Koch Foundation grant supported a study by the IZA Institute of Labor Economics, attributing a Superspreader event to the lack of social distancing at the August 2020 Sturgis Motorcycle Rally. The Koch Foundation similarly funded a set of studies by faculty at Bowling Green State University, arguing that political opposition to lockdowns and non-compliance with lockdown measures were explained by "libertarian and neoliberal elements within Christian nationalism" and "xenophobic" beliefs within these groups.

=== Gay rights ===
David Koch voiced support for gay marriage; in 2015 signed an amicus curiae in the DeBoer v. Snyder case which supported same-sex couples constitutional right to marry. Some gay rights advocates have complained that despite the brothers' vocal ideological libertarian stand against "government 'intrusions,' including ... laws that criminalized homosexuality", their devotion to conservative causes sometimes led them to support anti-gay rights politicians, (such as former Vice President Mike Pence, whose two campaigns for governor of Indiana the network "contributed heavily to"), and organizations (such as the American Legislative Exchange Council, which "at least in its early years, strongly opposed LGBTQ equality").

=== Abortion ===
David Koch also voiced support for "women's right to choose"; however, critics observed that the Koch brothers network's deep ties to the conservative movement meant it "helped to bankroll the anti-abortion groups" (such as a $500,000 donation to the anti-abortion Susan B. Anthony List) that successfully supported Supreme Court nominees (Neil Gorsuch, Kavanaugh, Amy Coney Barrett) who helped overturn Roe v. Wade ruling. In 2010, the Koch brothers network group Center to Protect Patient Rights "provided Americans United for Life Action [the 501(c)(4) wing of Americans United for Life] with 39 percent of the group's operating budget that year". In the same year, it "granted more than $1 million to the Susan B. Anthony (SBA) List", which amounted "about half of the $2 million the group spent that year on advertising for anti-choice candidates and against pro-choice candidates in state and federal races across the country". At the same time, two major organizations linked to Charles and David Koch—the Center to Protect Patient Rights and Freedom Partners—were both funding millions of dollars into the movement to ban abortion. A Koch network spokesman was quoted as saying, "We do not and have never worked on the issue of abortion. The grant in 2017 [to the Susan B. Anthony List] was the last payment on a previous commitment by Freedom Partners, which was intended to support SBA's grassroots efforts to get-out-the-vote among those concerned about government spending — not issue advocacy."

=== Critical race theory ===
Opposition to what was purported to be critical race theory was promoted by organizations funded by the Koch brothers in 2021. In September 2021, leaders of the Koch network came out in opposition to government bans of critical race theory.

=== Evolution ===
In 2009, David Koch gave the Smithsonian Institution $15 million for the purpose of building a hall covering 6 million years of human evolution. He has given the American Museum of Natural History $20 million and the Smithsonian $35 million to build dinosaur halls. Salon writes that "one of David Koch's biggest hobbies, beyond his more general philanthropic pursuits, is paleontology", and that Koch Industries, "make their money from the daily business of rock strata and fossil fuels, the kind of practical geological work that leaves no doubt about the age of the Earth. In the Archeology interview, [David] Koch spoke about young earth creationists with a kind of bewildered disdain. He had nothing but kind words for Darwin."

=== Immigration ===
Following President Joe Biden's 2022 State of the Union address, Jorge Lima, senior vice president for policy at the Koch brothers connected Americans for Prosperity stated, "Rather than continuing to use immigration as a wedge issue, we urge lawmakers to roll up their sleeves and drive solutions that both tackle these issues and have broad public support. But Congress must do the work to get this done ... we are devoting resources and marshaling our activists across the nation to contact their elected officials, share their support and urgency, and drive decisive action on these solutions without delay."

== Response to liberal critics ==
=== Response to Harry Reid ===
In 2014, Democratic Senate Majority Leader Harry Reid accused the Koch brothers of trying to "buy the country" in a statement made on the floor of the Senate. Koch Companies Public Sector CEO Philip Ellender responded, "Sen. Reid's divisive remarks were not only disrespectful and beneath the office he holds, they were indicative of what lengths he and his Democratic allies will go to eliminate and silence their political opposition."

=== Jane Mayer article in The New Yorker ===
According to journalist Jane Mayer, the Koch brothers "are known for their strongly conservative politics and for their efforts to finance a network of advocacy groups whose goal is to move the country to the right". Conor Friedersdorf of The Atlantic's "Daily Dish" defended the Kochs, saying that while he respected Mayer, "as best I can tell, the Koch brothers are legitimately upset by some aspects of the piece, and anyone who reads it should also look at the rebuttals from libertarians who are persuasively pushing back against some of its conclusions." A Koch Industries company spokesperson issued a statement saying, "No funding has been provided by Koch companies, the Koch foundation, or Charles Koch or David Koch specifically to support the tea parties." Koch Industries posted a reply on its website. It acknowledged funding libertarian and conservative causes, but stated there were inaccuracies and distortions in Mayer's article, and that she failed to identify alleged conflicts of interest on the part of several persons whom she quoted.

== See also ==
- Campaign finance in the United States
- Citizen Koch, 2013 documentary film
- Koch Brothers Exposed (2012), a documentary film about the political activities of the Koch brothers
- KochPAC, the Koch Industries Inc Political Action Committee
- Political finance
