= Abominable Snowman (disambiguation) =

Abominable Snowman is a common name for the Yeti, an apelike animal cryptid said to inhabit the Himalaya region of Nepal and Tibet.

Abominable Snowman may also refer to:

== Fictional characters ==
- Abominable Snowman (comics), a fictional character in the Marvel Comics Universe
- Hugo the Abominable Snowman, a character in the Bugs Bunny/Daffy Duck cartoon, The Abominable Snow Rabbit (1961), that spoofed the 1957 film
- Abominable Snowman, a character in the Pixar film Monsters, Inc. (2001), voiced by John Ratzenberger
- Abominable Snowman, the name Jimmy gives to himself in Margaret Atwood's novel Oryx and Crake (2003)

== Films and television ==
- The Abominable Snowman (film), a 1957 British horror film, directed by Val Guest, and starring Forrest Tucker and Peter Cushing
- Deadly Descent: The Abominable Snowman, a 2013 American television film, directed by Marko Mäkilaakso, and starring Chuck Campbell and Adrian Paul
- The Abominable Snowmen (1967), a serial in the British science fiction television series Doctor Who

== Literature ==
- The Case of the Abominable Snowman, 1941 detective novel by Cecil Day-Lewis
- The Abominable Snowman of Pasadena (December 1995), the 38th book in author R.L. Stine's Goosebumps series
- The Abominable Snowman (gamebook), in the Choose Your Own Adventure series

== See also ==
- Yeti (disambiguation)
