= Susan Albright =

American journalist

- Occupations: Journalist, editor
- Employers: Syracuse Herald-Journal; Louisville Times; Arizona Daily Star; Star Tribune; MinnPost
- Known for: Editor of the editorial pages of the Star Tribune, managing editor of MinnPost
- Title: Managing editor of MinnPost (2008–2021)

Susan Albright is an American journalist and editor based in Minneapolis, Minnesota. She was editor of the editorial pages of the Star Tribune for about 15 years, and from 2008 until her retirement in September 2021 she was managing editor of the nonprofit news site MinnPost.

Albright served for many years on the World Press Institute's board of directors and its executive board. Her articles about the craft of editorial writing include “Sights and Sounds of a Newspaper’s Editorials” in Nieman Reports, Winter 2006.

She served as a juror for the Pulitzer Prizes in 1998, 1999, 2013, and 2014; has served several times as a Blue Ribbon judge for the California Newspaper Publishers Association's annual journalism contest; and has appeared several times as a regional commenter on PBS' "NewsHour."

== Career ==
Albright held editing positions at the Arizona Daily Star in Tucson, the Louisville Times and the Syracuse Herald-Journal. She was editorial page editor of the Arizona Daily Star from 1985 to 1993, then edited the editorial pages of the Minneapolis Star Tribune for about 15 years. During that time the editorial staff won numerous state and national awards, launched several online opinion initiatives and introduced a Sunday opinion section, the Opinion Exchange.

In September 2007, Star Tribune interim publisher Chris Harte announced that Albright was leaving after 15 years saying that they had differed over the direction of the editorial page that he wanted to focus more on local issues than on the national and international ones it had emphasized under her.

In February 2008, she joined MinnPost as co-managing editor, sharing the role with Roger Buoen, and continued to write about world and national affairs for the site. She retired in September 2021 after 13 years at MinnPost and was succeeded by Harry Colbert Jr.

== Professional activities ==
Albright was president of the National Conference of Editorial Writers (now the Association of Opinion Journalists) in 1999. During her presidency she proposed that the organization publish a book of best practices, and she wrote the management chapter of the resulting handbook titled Beyond Argument: A Handbook for Editorial Writers which was published by the NCEW and the Scripps Howard Foundation. She also served as a trustee of the NCEW Foundation led a task force that surveyed editorial-page readership in the United States, and helped found the foundation's annual Minority Writers Seminar. She served for many years on the board of the World Press Institute.

Her article "Sights and Sounds of a Newspaper's Editorials" appeared in Nieman Reports in winter 2006. She has discussed public affairs on National Public Radio's All Things Considered and on PBS's NewsHour.
