= Generation Opportunity =

Former American political advocacy organization

- Formation: 2010
- Headquarters: Arlington, Virginia
- Methods: Activism, policy advocacy
- Website: generationopportunity.org

Generation Opportunity was a center-right political advocacy organization in the United States focused on economic policy and aimed at young adults. It was a sister organization to the Americans for Prosperity-led political network initially funded by the Koch family. The group had campaigned against the Affordable Care Act.

== History ==
Founded in 2010, Generation Opportunity initially focused on a variety of issues including taxes, high gas prices, and broader economic issues. Generation Opportunity then began to look at youth unemployment statistics and the Millennial Jobs Report, which gave unemployment statistics for 18- to 29-year-olds on the first day of each month. In September 2013, Generation Opportunity launched a campaign called "Opt Out of Obamacare". Evan Feinberg headed the organization from 2013 through 2015. In 2016, the organization released its "The State of the Millennial Report", which reviews the challenges and opportunities faced by young people in the United States

== Issues ==
=== Youth unemployment ===
On the first Friday of every month, Generation Opportunity used the information released from the Bureau of Labor Statistics to calculate unemployment for Americans aged 18–29. Generation Opportunity advocated for removing barriers to youth employment such as occupational licenses and regulations harmful to the sharing economy. Another strategy for reducing youth unemployment that is advocated by the organization is criminal justice reform, since a criminal sentence often traps generations of Americans into cyclical poverty.

=== Affordable Care Act ===
Generation Opportunity opposed the Affordable Care Act and had campaigned against it. Generation Opportunity launched its Opt Out of Obamacare campaign in September 2013. Generation Opportunity conducted a college campus tour to 20 campuses to convince college students to sign a petition to opt out of the Affordable Care Act. The organization stated that its goal was to inform millennials of options outside of the Affordable Care Act, and to raise awareness of the cost of the Act for younger generations.

On September 18, 2013 it released a video advertisement named "Opt Out - The Exam - Creepy Uncle Sam". The video received over 600,000 views within its first 36 hours, 3.5 million views within its first week, and drew a response from President Obama during a speech in Maryland. The video featured "Uncle Sam" intruding between the legs of a female patient during a gynecological exam. A third "Creepy Uncle Sam" video was released on October 25, receiving 300,000 views in 3 days.

== Reception ==
When asked to explain the "Uncle Sam" ad, Feinberg compared his ad to the ad Democrats ran against Congressman Paul Ryan on his proposal to restructure Medicare: "They're not suggesting Paul Ryan is literally pushing granny off a cliff but trying to make a policy point," he said. "We're trying to make a policy point that Obamacare is creepy and invasive. It's obvious satire."

=== Funding ===
In 2013, Politico reported that Generation Opportunity had received a $5 million grant from Freedom Partners, a group of about 200 donors that is associated with Charles and David Koch.

== See also ==
- Generation Progress
