= Paul Conway (butcher) =

Scottish butcher and businessman (born 1978)

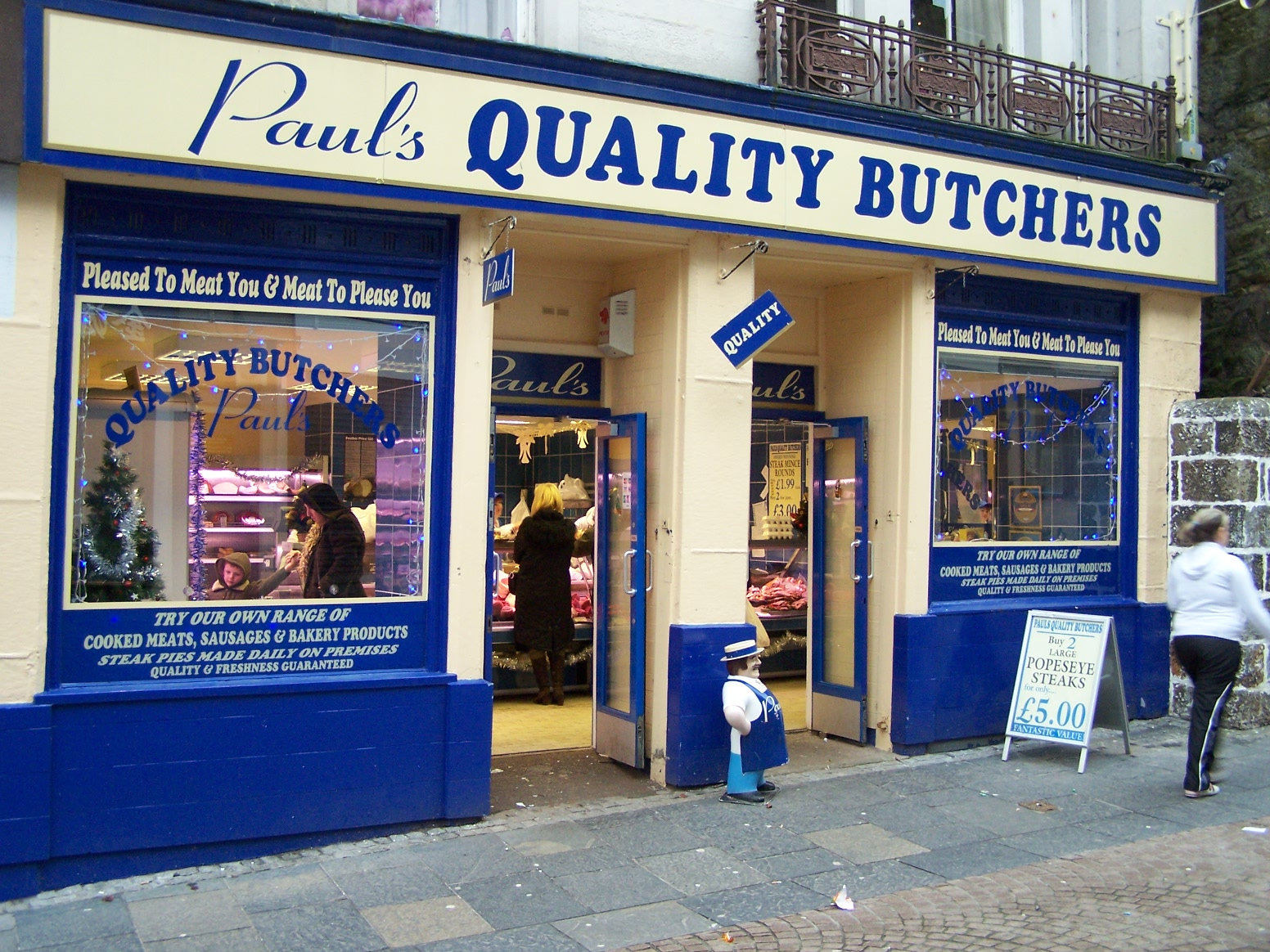
- Paul's Quality Butchers, Kilsyth
- Born: 1978 (age 47–48); Kilsyth, Scotland
- Occupations: Butcher, CEO

Paul Conway (born 1978) is a Scottish butcher and businessman and is proprietor of Paul's Quality Butchers, in Scotland, with a branch in Condorrat. He has won several trade and business awards, and is involved in community philanthropy.

== Background and training ==
Paul Conway gained work experience from 12 years of age in the local butcher's shop. After leaving school, Conway became an apprentice with a local butcher, gaining experience in different butchers' shops. Due to the financial pressure of having a young family, Conway went into debt. He approached The Prince's Scottish Youth Business Trust (PSYBT) who approved his business plan awarding a start up loan. Conway benefited from the help of his mentor, Mr. Rogers.

== Rise and fall ==
With the help of the Princes Trust, Mr Conway put together a business plan that allowed him in 2006 to buy the Bonnybridge premises that now operate as a butchery/bakery business. The business originally thrived, but a few years later ran into significant trading difficulties as debt was called in, with the closure of several branch premises.

== Awards ==
Conway took gold medals in two categories—traditional steak pie and speciality pie (steak and sausage) on 26 September 2007, at the Steak Pie evaluation organised by the Scottish Federation of Meat Trades held at the Garfield House Hotel, Stepps. He also came away with overall Scottish third place and first place for the West of Scotland at the Scottish Pork Sausage Championships held in Perth on 12 May. In 2006, he won silver awards for his Pork & Cracked Pepper Sausage and Cumberland Sausage.

He was a 2004 Regional Business Award winner at the Prince's Scottish Youth Business Trust The Prince's Trust / The Royal Bank of Scotland 'Young Entrepreneur of the Year' Awards and Finalist in the Youth Business International Entrepreneur of the Year award 2006.

Conway's shop in Kilsyth was named the Scottish Butcher's Shop of the Year in the final of the UK Butcher's shop of the year contest which is organised every year by Meat Trades Journal, held at Gordon Ramsay's restaurant at Claridge's, London on 20 November 2007.

== Appearances ==
He addressed Prince Charles and MSPs at the Scottish Parliament in July 2005, and was featured in celebrity chef Gordon Ramsay's The F-Word programme on Channel 4.

== Community and philanthropy ==
Conway sponsored local youth boxing and football teams and cultural events and spoke regularly at PSYBT events.

== Family ==
Conway is widowed and a father of five children. The youngest, Alleisha, was born in October 2007. His wife, the author Karen Frances. died of COVID-19 on 18 January 2021. ,
