= KochPAC =

American political action committee (PAC)

- Type: Political action committee
- Headquarters: Suite 800; 600 14th Street, NW; Washington, DC 20005
- Treasurer: Gael Fletcher (1993–1995); Kimberlyrenee Kahoe (1996–2000); Arianne Duddy Massey (2000); Christine M. Taylor (2000–2003); Dorothy P. Posey (2004); Lacye R. Tennille (2005–present)
- Parent organization: Koch Industries

KochPAC (the Koch Industries Inc Political Action Committee) is a United States political action committee that represents the interests of Koch Industries and its affiliates.

== Background ==
KochPAC is a political action committee that is funded by employees of Koch Industries and its affiliates. It funds mainly Republican candidates for the US Congress. Greg Guest, senior director of corporate communications at Georgia-Pacific, has stated that KochPAC supports candidates "based on their support for market-based policies and economic freedom".

== 2011–2012 activities ==
OpenSecrets' compilation of Federal Election Commission forms for 2012 indicated that KochPAC received $1,746,950 with donations of at least $200 from 3,096 individual donors.

=== 2012 House of Representatives elections ===
In the 2012 House of Representatives elections, KochPAC contributed $28,000 to 4 Democratic candidates and $1,500,000 to 207 Republican candidates.

The top recipient of campaign funding was Joe Walsh (R-IL) who received $12,500. Other contributions included $10,000 each to ninety-four candidates, $9500 each to two candidates, $9000 to one candidate, $8500 each to two candidates, $7500 each to 20 candidates, $7000 to one candidate, $6000 each to two candidates, $5500 to one candidate, $5000 each to fifty-nine candidates, and $3500 or less each to twenty-eight candidates.

=== 2012 Senate elections ===
In the 2012 Senate elections, KochPAC contributed $10,000 to 1 Democratic candidate and $185,000 to 23 Republican candidates.

The top two recipients of campaign funding were Ted Cruz (R-TX) and Orrin Hatch (R-UT), who each received $15,000. Other contributions included $10,000 each to a total of twelve candidates, $7000 to one candidate, $5000 each to seven candidates, $2000 to one candidate, and $1000 to one candidate.

=== Interorganizational contributions ===
During the 2012 election year, KochPAC contributed $24,000 to Democrat-affiliated organizations, $802,000 to Republican-affiliated organizations, and $10,000 to other organizations. The Target State Victory Fund, which received $35,000, was the single largest recipient of these funds. Other recipients included the Republican National Committee, the National Republican Congressional Committee, and the National Republican Senatorial Committee, which each received $30,000, the Romney Victory, which received $25,000, as well as fifty-three organizations which received $10,000 and forty-five organizations which received $7500 or less. KochPAC also received $5000 from the Senate Conservatives Fund.

== See also ==
- Political activities of the Koch brothers
