= American Future Fund =

American political advocacy organization

- American Future Fund logo
- Founded: 2007
- Type: 501(c)(4) Nonprofit
- Tax ID no.: 26-0620554 (EIN)
- Location(s): 4225 Fleur Drive Ste 142; Des Moines, Iowa 50312
- Coordinates: 41.5463°N 93.6449°W
- Region served: United States
- Members: 3
- Key people: Sandra Greiner, President
- Revenue: $23,304,826 (2010)
- Employees: 0
- Volunteers: 32,340
- Website: americanfuturefund.com

The American Future Fund is a 501(c)(4) tax-exempt organization based in Iowa.

== Organization ==
Nick Ryan, an adviser to U.S. Representative Jim Nussle, founded the organization in 2007. Its current president is another Iowa state Senator Sandra Greiner. All are Republicans who served on Mitt Romney's campaign for the Republican U.S. Presidential nomination in 2008.

The fund describes itself as providing Americans with "a conservative and free market viewpoint" with the means to communicate and advocate on behalf of those beliefs. In 2010, the fund reported over 9 million dollars of independent campaign expenditures to the Federal Election Commission, and all of its expenditures benefited Republicans. According to OpenSecrets, the American Future Fund ranked fourth in spending by nonprofits during the 2012 federal elections.

The organization does not disclose the names of those who provide its funding. The Koch brothers have acknowledged funding the American Freedom Fund in some years. Others identified as providing funding include Iowa businessman Bruce Rastetter, a founder of US ethanol-producer Hawkeye Energy Holdings, and the Pharmaceutical Research and Manufacturers of America, a lobbying group.

It is affiliated with the Center to Protect Patient Rights.

== Activities ==
The Fund's first communications effort was a positive ad in support of a candidate. Much of its communications work since then have involved negative advertising against Democrats, but also includes advocacy for a Libertarian candidate designed to hurt a Democrat's chance of winning an election and television ads against Donald Trump during his campaign for the 2016 Republican presidential nomination.

- In March 2008, the Fund produced a television advertisement in support of U.S. Senator Norm Coleman, who was running for re-election in Minnesota.
- In 2012 the organization funded ads supporting Mitt Romney's bid for the U.S. presidency. Its spending during that election cycle exceeded $21 million, with half of that amount spent in support of Romney.
- In 2012, it funded ads attacking Missouri Attorney General Chris Koster
- In 2012 it funded ads in support of California's Proposition 32, which would prevent unions from collecting political contributions as paycheck deductions.
- In 2012, it funded attack against U.S. Representative Martin Heinrich who was running for the U.S. Senate from New Mexico.
- In 2014 the fund sponsored ads in support of the Libertarian candidate in the North Carolina U.S. Senate election, Sean Haugh. The ads portrayed Haugh as an anti-war candidate and supporter of the legalization of cannabis. They told voters who supported these positions to avoid voting for Senator Kay Hagan, the incumbent and a Democrat. Haugh, who believed the American Future Fund is financed by Charles and David Koch, said the ads gave him "a whole new reason to despise Koch brothers and their dark money".
- In 2014 in the Wisconsin gubernatorial election the Fund sponsored a series of nine advertisements promoting Libertarian candidate Robert Burke, a former Republican, on the basis of his advocacy for legalizing marijuana. The campaign of Democratic candidate Mary Burke, as well as by some journalists and commentators, believed they represented an attempt to divide or confuse progressive and liberal voters. Burke said: "While I endorse the full legalization of cannabis, I do not endorse in any way the message of this ad." The incumbent Governor Scott Walker, a Republican, denied any connection to the ads. The ads include a statement that they are not sponsored or approved by any candidate, but rather by the American Future Fund alone.
- In 2016, the Fund spent more than $100,000 on television advertising in New Hampshire that called Ohio Governor John Kasich an "Obama Republican".
- In 2016, the Fund ran television advertisements in which former clients of Trump University described how they were taken in by the Trump brand name and manipulated into spending increasing amounts of money.
- In 2026, the Fund provided $425,000 in funding to a Virginia-based Political Action Committee (PAC), Justice for Democracy (PAC-26-00016), which the PAC used to oppose Virginia's redistricting movement

== See also ==
- Political activities of the Koch brothers
