= Continental Resources =

US petroleum and natural gas company

Continental Resources, Inc.
- Type: Privately held company
- Industry: Petroleum
- Predecessor: Shelly Dean Oil Co.
- Founded: 1967; 59 years ago
- Founder: Harold Hamm
- Headquarters: Oklahoma City, Oklahoma, U.S.
- Key people: Harold Hamm (Chairman Emeritus); Shelly Lambertz (Executive Chairman); Doug Lawler (President and CEO); John D. Hart (CFO)
- Products: Petroleum; Natural Gas
- Revenue: US$7.69 billion (2025)
- Operating income: US$2.68 billion (2025)
- Net income: US$2.09 billion (2025)
- Owner: Harold Hamm Family LLC (100%)
- Website: clr.com

Continental Resources, Inc. is an American petroleum and natural gas exploration and production company headquartered in Oklahoma City. The company was founded by Harold Hamm in 1967 at the age of 21 as Shelly Dean Oil Company, originally named for Hamm's two daughters. In 1990, Shelly Dean re-branded itself as Continental Resources. It primarily used hydraulic fracturing and directional drilling to produce from low permeability formations. In May 2007, the company became a public company but in November 2022, the company was acquired by affiliates of Harold Hamm.

== History ==
In 1967, Harold Hamm founded Shelly Dean Oil Co., Continental's predecessor.

In 1990, the company was renamed Continental Resources.

In 1995, the company discovered what was later described as the Cedar Hills Field in North Dakota, the 7th largest onshore field in the lower 48 United States ranked by liquid proved reserves, and was the first to develop it exclusively through precision horizontal drilling.

In 2003, the company drilled its first wells in the Bakken formation.

In 2004, the company completed the Robert Heuer 1-17R in Divide County, the 1st commercially successful well in the North Dakota Bakken to be both horizontally drilled and completed using hydraulic fracturing.

In 2007, the company became a public company via an initial public offering in which Harold Hamm sold approximately $300 million worth of his shares.

In 2008, the company was the first to complete a horizontal well in the Three Forks zone.

In 2010, Continental introduced the ECO-Pad® drilling technique, which involves drilling 4 wells from 1 pad. This reduced the cost of drilling and increased production output.

In 2012, the company moved its headquarters from Enid, Oklahoma to Oklahoma City.

In 2016, the company sold assets in North Dakota and Montana for $222 million.

In 2017, the company sold 26,000 acres in the Arkoma Basin for $68 million.

In 2021, the company acquired 92,000 net leasehold acres and 50,000 net royalty acres in the Permian Basin from Pioneer Natural Resources for $3.25 billion.

In November 2022, the company was acquired by affiliates of Harold Hamm for $4.3 billion in cash.

In March 2026, the company announced a 15 year naming rights partnership with the Oklahoma City Thunder for the new area in downtown Oklahoma City. Continental Colisieum is scheduled to finish construction in 2028.

In September 2026, the company acquired FireBird Energy II LLC. The acquisition added approximately 54,000 net acres in the Midland Basin. The purchase price was undisclosed.

In September 2026, the company signed a preliminary deal with Petroleos de Venezuela to develop the Ayachucho 2 Block. The deal provides the company with 100% working interest in approximately 126,000 acres of the Orinoco Belt.
