= Generation Progress =

American youth activism organization

- Formation: 2005
- Dissolved: 2022
- Type: Non-profit, youth activism
- Headquarters: Washington, D.C.
- Parent organization: Center for American Progress
- Website: genprogress.org
- Formerly called: Campus Progress

Generation Progress was a youth-centered research and advocacy group that promotes progressive political and social policy through support for young people, students, and young activists in the United States. Generation Progress was the youth engagement arm of the Center for American Progress.

Launched in 2005 as Campus Progress, in 2013 the organization was renamed Generation Progress to reflect the group's work to reach beyond college campuses and involve older, working-class, and non-college-bound young people in progressive activism. Their main issue areas cover gun violence prevention, criminal justice reform, progressive economics, student debt, immigration, and climate change.

Generation Progress had a sister organization, Generation Progress Action, that engaged in political and electoral advocacy activities in elections.

== History ==
From the organization's founding in 2005 until 2012, Generation Progress was led by David Halperin, former White House speechwriter to President Bill Clinton. Halperin was succeeded by Anne Johnson, and then by Maggie Thompson, who formerly led the Higher Ed, Not Debt campaign. The current executive director of Generation Progress is Brent J. Cohen. As of 2021, Edwith Theogene was the director of advocacy at Generation Progress.

== Activities ==
Generation Progress had programs and multiple networks across issue areas. The organization lobbied Congress and state governments, produced media content, and conducted trainings. Generation Progress worked with Senator Elizabeth Warren in an attempt to curb rising student debt through a proposal which would lower interest rates and increase taxes.

The organization held it first yearly national conference in Washington D.C. in July 2005. The event featured President Bill Clinton and Rep. John Lewis. Subsequent national conferences featured Barack Obama, Tammy Baldwin, Samantha Power, Majora Carter, James A. Forbes, Nancy Pelosi, Russ Feingold, Keith Ellison, Tom Daschle, Ralph Nader, Seymour Hersh, and Fat Joe. The organization's events have been co-sponsored by Rock the Vote and the League of Women Voters.

== See also ==
- Generation Opportunity
