= Eric Black (writer) =

American journalist

Eric Black is an American journalist based in Minnesota.

== Career ==
He was a longtime reporter for the Minnesota Star Tribune newspaper, and has also been a Twin Cities blogger. He worked as a columnist for online newspaper MinnPost, primarily writing about politics and the historical background of current issues, but announced his retirement in a post dated March 21, 2023

As part of the coverage of the bicentennial of the US Constitution in 1987, he was assigned by the Minnesota Star Tribune to write a series of detailed articles on the history of the Constitution, not only its creation, but also its evolution and impact through the years. These articles formed the basis of a book subsequently published as OUR CONSTITUTION The Myth that Binds Us, in which he argues, in part, that the power of the US Constitution derives in significant part not from the written text, but from commonly accepted beliefs about the text.

Black is the author of a book, Parallel Realities: A Jewish-Arab History of Israel/Palestine. It gives an overview of the two parties of the conflict, with arguments supporting why either side may be in the right, as well as criticizing them. The book also gives a summary of the historical events leading up to the modern day Israeli-Palestinian conflict.

== Awards ==
In 2017 the national Society of Professional Journalists presented Black with a Sigma Delta Chi Award for online column writing.
