= J. Anthony Lukas Book Prize =

Annual prize for journalism

J. Anthony Lukas Prize Project
- Description: Excellence in non-fiction, research, and social concern
- Sponsored by: Family of Mark Lynton
- Country: United States
- Presented by: Columbia University School of Journalism & Nieman Foundation
- Rewards: $10,000 (Book/History), $25,000 (Work-in-Progress)
- Website: journalism.columbia.edu/lukas

The J. Anthony Lukas Book Prize is an annual $10,000 award given to a book that exemplifies, "literary grace, a commitment to serious research and social concern." The prize is given by the Nieman Foundation and by the Columbia University School of Journalism.

Established in 1998, the Lukas Prize Project consists of three awards:

- The J. Anthony Lukas Book Prize ($10,000)
- The Mark Lynton History Prize ($10,000)
- The J. Anthony Lukas Work-in-Progress Award ($25,000 plus $5,000 for an annual finalist)

The project is named for Pulitzer Prize-winning American journalist and author, J. Anthony Lukas; it has been underwritten since its inception by the family of Mark Lynton, a German Jew who had careers with the British military, Citroen and Hunter Douglas.

== Recipients ==
In the list below, winners are listed first in the gold row, followed by the other nominees. Any finalists are marked with an asterisk. Note that shortlists were announced only starting in 2016; previously they would just announce winners and any finalists.

indicates the winner

Award winners and shortlists
| Year | Author | Title | Publisher | Result | Ref. |
|---|---|---|---|---|---|
| 1999 | Henry Mayer | All on Fire: William Lloyd Garrison and the Abolition of Slavery | | Winner | |
| 2000 | Witold Rybczynski | A Clearing in the Distance: Frederick Law Olmsted and America in the Nineteenth Century | | Winner | |
| 2001 | David Nasaw | The Chief: The Life of William Randolph Hearst | | Winner | |
| 2002 | Diane McWhorter | Carry Me Home: Birmingham, Alabama, the Climactic Battle of the Civil Rights Revolution | | Winner | |
| 2003 | Samantha Power | "A Problem from Hell": America and the Age of Genocide | | Winner | |
| 2004 | David Maraniss | They Marched into Sunlight: War and Peace, Vietnam and America, October 1967 | | Winner | |
| 2005 | Evan Wright | Generation Kill: Devil Dogs, Iceman, Captain America, and the New Face of American War | | Winner | |
| 2006 | Nate Blakeslee | Tulia: Race, Cocaine, and Corruption in a Small Texas Town | | Winner | |
| 2007 | Lawrence Wright | The Looming Tower: Al-Qaeda and the Road to 9/11 | | Winner | |
| 2008 | Jeffrey Toobin | The Nine: Inside the Secret World of the Supreme Court | | Winner | |
| 2009 | Jane Mayer | The Dark Side: The Inside Story of How the War on Terror Turned Into a War on American Ideals | Doubleday | Winner | |
| 2010 | David Finkel | The Good Soldiers | | Winner | |
| 2011 | Eliza Griswold | The Tenth Parallel: Dispatches from the Fault Line Between Christianity and Islam | Farrar, Straus & Giroux | Winner | |
| 2011 | Jefferson Cowie | Stayin' Alive: The 1970s and the Last Days of the Working Class | New Press | Finalist | |
| 2011 | Paul Greenberg | Four Fish: The Future of the Last Wild Food | Penguin Press | Finalist | |
| 2011 | Siddhartha Mukherjee | The Emperor of All Maladies: A Biography of Cancer | Scribner | Finalist | |
| 2012 | Daniel J. Sharfstein | The Invisible Line: Three American Families and the Secret Journey from Black to White | Viking Press | Winner | |
| 2012 | Manning Marable | Malcolm X: A Life of Reinvention | Viking Press | Finalist | |
| 2013 | Andrew Solomon | Far from the Tree: Parents, Children, and the Search for Identity | Scribner | Winner | |
| 2013 | Cynthia Carr | Fire in the Belly: The Life and Times of David Wojnarowicz | Bloomsbury | Finalist | |
| 2014 | Sheri Fink | Five Days at Memorial: Life and Death in a Storm-Ravaged Hospital | Crown Publishers | Winner | |
| 2014 | Jonathan M. Katz | The Big Truck That Went By: How the World Came to Save Haiti and Left Behind a Disaster | Palgrave Macmillan | Finalist | |
| 2015 | Jenny Nordberg | The Underground Girls of Kabul: In Search of a Hidden Resistance in Afghanistan | Crown Publishers | Winner | |
| 2015 | Joshua Davis | Spare Parts: Four Undocumented Teenagers, One Ugly Robot, and the Battle for the American Dream | Farrar, Straus and Giroux | Shortlist | |
| 2016 | Susan Southard | Nagasaki: Life After Nuclear War | Viking Penguin | Winner | |
| 2016 | Dale Russakoff | The Prize: Who's in Charge of America's Schools? | Houghton Mifflin Harcourt | Finalist | |
| 2016 | Adam Briggle | A Field Philosopher's Guide to Fracking: How One Texas Town Stood Up to Big Oil and Gas | Liveright | Shortlist | |
| 2016 | Kathryn J. Edin and H. Luke Shaefer | $2.00 a Day: Living on Almost Nothing in America | Houghton Mifflin Harcourt | Shortlist | |
| 2016 | Stephen Witt | How Music Got Free: The End of an Industry, the Turn of the Century, and the Patient Zero of Piracy | Viking Penguin | Shortlist | |
| 2017 | Gary Younge | Another Day in the Death of America: A Chronicle of Ten Short Lives | Nation Books | Winner | |
| 2017 | Zachary Roth | The Great Suppression: Voting Rights, Corporate Cash, and the Conservative Assault on Democracy | Crown | Finalist | |
| 2017 | Arlie Russell Hochschild | Strangers in Their Own Land: Anger and Mourning On the American Right | The New Press | Shortlist | |
| 2017 | Nancy Isenberg | White Trash: The 400-Year Untold History of Class in America | Viking | Shortlist | |
| 2017 | Jane Mayer | Dark Money: The Hidden History of the Billionaires Behind the Rise of the Radical Right | Doubleday | Shortlist | |
| 2018 | Amy Goldstein | Janesville: An American Story | Simon & Schuster | Winner | |
| 2018 | Jessica Bruder | Nomadland: Surviving America in the Twenty-First Century | W.W. Norton & Company | Finalist | |
| 2018 | Nate Blakeslee | American Wolf: A True Story of Survival and Obsession in the West | Crown | Shortlist | |
| 2018 | Lauren Markham | The Far Away Brothers: Two Young Migrants And the Making of an American Life | Crown | Shortlist | |
| 2018 | Helen Thorpe | The Newcomers: Finding Refuge, Friendship, and Hope in an American Classroom | Scribner | Shortlist | |
| 2019 | Shane Bauer | American Prison: A Reporter's Undercover Journey into the Business of Punishment | Penguin Press | Winner | |
| 2019 | Lauren Hilgers | Patriot Number One: American Dreams in Chinatown | Crown | Finalist | |
| 2019 | Howard Blum | In the Enemy's House: The Secret Saga of the FBI Agent and the Code Breaker Who Caught the Russian Spies | HarperCollins | Shortlist | |
| 2019 | Chris McGreal | American Overdose: The Opioid Tragedy in Three Acts | PublicAffairs | Shortlist | |
| 2019 | Sarah Smarsh | Heartland: A Memoir of Working Hard and Being Broke in the Richest Country on Earth | Scribner | Shortlist | |
| 2020 | Alex Kotlowitz | An American Summer: Love and Death in Chicago | Nan A. Talese/Doubleday | Winner | |
| 2020 | Emily Bazelon | Charged: The Movement to Transform American Prosecution and End Mass Incarceration | Random House | Finalist | |
| 2020 | Jennifer Berry Hawes | Grace Will Lead Us Home: The Charleston Church Massacre and the Hard, Inspiring Journey to Forgiveness | St. Martin's Press | Shortlist | |
| 2020 | Jodie Adams Kirshner | Broke: Hardship and Resilience in a City of Broken Promises | St. Martin's Press | Shortlist | |
| 2020 | Margaret O'Mara | The Code: Silicon Valley and the Remaking of America | Penguin Press | Shortlist | |
| 2021 | Jessica Goudeau | After the Last Border: Two Families and the Story of Refuge in America | Viking | Winner | |
| 2021 | Barton Gellman | Dark Mirror: Edward Snowden and the American Surveillance State | Penguin Press | Finalist | |
| 2021 | Becky Cooper | We Keep the Dead Close: A Murder at Harvard and a Half Century of Silence | Grand Central Publishing | Shortlist | |
| 2021 | Seyward Darby | Sisters in Hate: American Women on the Front Lines of White Nationalism | Little, Brown and Company | Shortlist | |
| 2021 | Isabel Wilkerson | Caste: The Origins of Our Discontents | Random House | Shortlist | |
| 2022 | Andrea Elliott | Invisible Child: Poverty, Survival & Hope in an American City | Random House | Winner | |
| 2022 | Patrick Radden Keefe | Empire of Pain: The Secret History of the Sackler Dynasty | Doubleday | Finalist | |
| 2022 | Scott Ellsworth | The Ground Breaking: An American City and Its Search for Justice | Dutton | Shortlist | |
| 2022 | Jessica Nordell | The End of Bias: A Beginning: The Science and Practice of Overcoming Unconscious Bias | Metropolitan | Shortlist | |
| 2022 | Joshua Prager | The Family Roe: An American Story | Norton/Liverigh | Shortlist | |
| 2023 | Linda Villarosa | Under the Skin: The Hidden Toll of Racism on American Lives and on the Health of Our Nation | Doubleday | Winner | |
| 2023 | Robert Samuels and Toluse Olorunnipa | His Name Is George Floyd: One Man’s Life and the Struggle for Racial Justice | Viking | Finalist | |
| 2023 | Rachel Aviv | Strangers to Ourselves: Unsettled Minds and the Stories That Make Us | Farrar, Straus and Giroux | Shortlist | |
| 2023 | Lyndsie Bourgon | Tree Thieves: Crime and Survival in North America’s Woods | Little, Brown Spark | Shortlist | |
| 2023 | Jack Lowery | It Was Vulgar & It Was Beautiful: How AIDS Activists Used Art to Fight a Pandemic | Bold Type Books | Shortlist | |
| 2024 | Dashka Slater | Accountable: The True Story of a Racist Social Media Account and the Teenagers Whose Lives It Changed | Farrar, Straus and Giroux | Winner | |
| 2024 | Kerry Howley | Bottoms Up and the Devil Laughs: A Journey Through the Deep State | Knopf | Finalist | |
| 2024 | Cara McGoogan | Blood Farm: The Explosive Big Pharma Scandal that Altered the AIDS Crisis | | Shortlist | |
| 2024 | Cameron McWhirter and Zusha Elinson | American Gun: The True Story of the AR-15 | | Shortlist | |
| 2024 | Joe Sexton | The Lost Sons of Omaha: Two Young Men in an American Tragedy | | Shortlist | |
| 2025 | Rebecca Nagle | By the Fire We Carry: The Generations-Long Fight for Justice on Native Land | Harper | Winner | |
| 2025 | Pamela Prickett and Stefan Timmermans | The Unclaimed: Abandonment and Hope in the City of Angels | Crown | Finalist | |
| 2025 | Richard Beck | Homeland: The War on Terror in American Life | Crown | Shortlist | |
| 2025 | Barbara Bradley Hagerty | Bringing Ben Home: A Murder, a Conviction, and the Fight to Redeem American Justice | Penguin Random House | Shortlist | |
| 2025 | Mara Kardas-Nelson | We Are Not Able to Live in the Sky: The Seductive Promise of Microfinance | Metropolitan | Shortlist | |
| 2026 | Jeff Hobbs | Seeking Shelter: A Working Mother, Her Children, and a Story of Homelessness in America | Scribner | Winner | |
| 2026 | Rich Benjamin | Talk to Me: Lessons From a Family Forged by History | Pantheon | Finalist | |
| 2026 | Bench Ansfield | Born in Flames: The Business of Arson and the Remaking of the American City | W.W. Norton | Shortlist | |
| 2026 | Mariah Blake | They Poisoned the World: Life and Death in the Age of Forever Chemicals | Crown | Shortlist | |
| 2026 | Danielle Leavitt | By the Second Spring: Seven Lives and One Year of the War in Ukraine | Farrar, Straus and Giroux | Shortlist | |

== See also ==
- Mark Lynton History Prize
- J. Anthony Lukas Work-in-Progress Award
