= Deadly River: Cholera and Cover-Up in Post-Earthquake Haiti =

2016 book by Ralph R. Frerichs

- Cover
- Author: Ralph R. Frerichs
- Language: English
- Series: The Culture and Politics of Health Care Work
- Subject: 2010s Haiti cholera outbreak, epidemiology, United Nations Stabilization Mission in Haiti
- Genre: Non-fiction
- Publisher: Cornell University Press (ILR Press)
- Publication date: 2016
- Publication place: United States
- Media type: Print (hardcover, paperback) and ebook
- Pages: 301
- ISBN: 978-1-5017-0230-3
- OCLC: 932060329
- Dewey Decimal: 614.5/14097294
- LC Class: RA644.C3 F74 2016
- Website: deadlyriver.com

Deadly River: Cholera and Cover-Up in Post-Earthquake Haiti is a 2016 book by the American epidemiologist Ralph R. Frerichs. The book follows the French epidemiologist Renaud Piarroux's investigation into the origin of the 2010 Haitian cholera epidemic and traces it to a United Nations Stabilization Mission in Haiti (MINUSTAH) peacekeeping camp at Mèyé, near Mirebalais, garrisoned by a Nepalese battalion. Frerichs covers approximately the first four years of the epidemic and contrasts Piarroux's "human activity" account with the competing "environmental" hypothesis associated with the microbiologist Rita Colwell, while documenting what he characterizes as a campaign of denial and misdirection by the United Nations, the World Health Organization, the Pan American Health Organization, and the U.S. Centers for Disease Control and Prevention.

== Background ==
Frerichs, professor emeritus and founding Chair of the Department of Epidemiology at the UCLA Fielding School of Public Health, came to the subject from a longstanding interest in the history of cholera investigation. Before turning to Haiti, he had worked in 16 middle and lower income counties with infectious disease issues and had maintained a research website on the nineteenth-century English physician John Snow, considered the father of modern epidemiology, and the 1854 Broad Street cholera outbreak, a study widely regarded functional as to modern field epidemiology. When a large outbreak of cholera appeared in October 2010 in Haiti, a country with no modern history of the disease, the Haitian government asked French epidemiologist Renaud Piarroux to investigate. Frerichs began regular correspondence with the epidemiologist Renaud Piarroux in January 2011, three months after the onset of the Haitian epidemic, and structured the resulting book around Piarroux's day-by-day reconstruction of the November 2010 field investigation in Centre and Artibonite départements. A companion website at www.deadlyriver.com, maintained by Frerichs independently of the publisher, supplied supplementary maps, references and primary source documents.

In a 2016 interview, Frerichs described the two competing scientific accounts of the outbreak in terms he carried into the book: an "environmental theory," in which non-pathogenic Vibrio cholerae in coastal estuaries underwent a genomic transformation into a toxigenic form, and a "human activity theory," in which toxigenic Vibrio cholerae was introduced into the country by infected people arriving from outside. Frerichs stated that the environmental account had particular appeal for those who preferred to characterize the outbreak as a "nature's accident," in which no person or institution bore responsibility. He wrote that the official figure of roughly 9,000 deaths was likely an undercount, citing post-outbreak household surveys that placed the death toll in the range of 11,000 to 12,000, a magnitude he compared with the Western African Ebola virus epidemic that took place during the same period.

== Synopsis ==
The book recounts the 2010 Haitian cholera epidemic and Renaud Piarroux's investigation. Piarroux traced the outbreak to a MINUSTAH peacekeeping camp at Mèyé, near Mirebalais, garrisoned by a Nepalese battalion. It became the largest national cholera outbreak in modern history, with more than 768,000 reported cases and 9,000 deaths by April 2016. Frerichs writes in the third person, with Piarroux as the central figure in a non-fictional medical mystery. He covers the first four years of the outbreak, from its onset in the Artibonite River valley in October 2010 to the UN's partial reversal in 2014.

On October 19, 2010, two schoolboys died in Bocozel. Severe watery diarrhea was surging along the lower Artibonite, Haiti's main watercourse and the spine of its rice-growing valley. After chapters on the microbiology of Vibrio cholerae and the seven cholera pandemics, Frerichs sets the political scene. A presidential election was approaching. MINUSTAH was unpopular, often regarded by Haitians as an occupying force. Foreign experts insisted early on that the source of cholera could not, or need not, be determined considered highly unusual by epidemiologist Frerichs since source investigation is considered standard in outbreak investigations. Piarroux arrived in Port-au-Prince on November 7, 2010, at the request of the French embassy and the Haitian Ministry of Health. He had eliminated cholera from the Comoros island of Grande Comore in 1999 and led cholera investigations in several other countries.

Piarroux's November 2010 investigation in Centre and Artibonite départements forms the longest section of the book. Frerichs follows with captivating details: meetings, road trips, river-flow estimates, talks with villagers near the Annapurna Camp. The Nepalese battalion had arrived in shifts from October 9, days after a later discovered cholera outbreak in Kathmandu. Piarroux and his Haitian colleague Robert Barrais observed pipes running from the camp to a tributary stream. They learned of a young man who died of cholera-like illness on October 17 after sharing food with soldiers. An October 24-25, 2010 report by Haitian epidemiologists describing the likely source of the outbreak was originally suppressed, but then secretly delivered to Piarroux. He and his colleague reconstructed a "common-source" outbreak: one large discharge of contaminated waste from an upriver military base producing the simultaneous explosion of cases downriver. Piarroux's November 29, 2010 mission report named the Nepalese UN battalion as the likely source. It called for a judicial inquiry and a review of UN pre-deployment screening and sanitation.

In the second half, Frerichs describes what he and several reviewers viewed as deliberate concealment of the upriver origin. UN Office for the Coordination of Humanitarian Affairs (OCHA) maps with the legend naming the village of Mèyé as the "zone where cholera began" had been replaced. The CDC preferred a convenience sample and case-only study over a case-control investigation. Early statements discouraged the search for the source. They came from WHO cholera task force head Claire-Lise Chaignat, CDC officials Eric Mintz and Jordan Tappero, and the Pan American Health Organization. Frerichs links the competing theory to University of Maryland microbiologist Rita Colwell and her "perfect storm" hypothesis. It held that the epidemic arose from non-pathogenic Vibrio cholerae in coastal estuaries reanimated by the earthquake, summer heat, and Hurricane Tomas. Frerichs argues it rested on two errors: a misdated chronology (Hurricane Tomas struck three weeks after the epidemic began) and reuse of an altered-legend OCHA map. The map appeared in a 2011 PNAS article co-authored by Colwell and Alejandro Cravioto, chair of the UN Panel of Independent Experts.

The John Snow Broad Street pump investigation and the seven cholera pandemics, including the El Tor biotype, get shorter chapters of their own. So do Haitian Vodou and the November 2010 lynching of about a dozen suspected sorcerers in Grand'Anse département, along with MINUSTAH's deployment after the 2004 ouster of Jean-Bertrand Aristide. Late-October 2010 dispatches by Sebastian Walker (Al Jazeera English) and Jonathan M. Katz (Associated Press) first publicly linked the camp to the outbreak as did later reports to Roberson Alfonse (Le Nouvelliste (Haiti)). The May 2011 report of the UN Panel of Independent Experts report (appointed by then-UN Secretary-General Ban Ki-moon) followed, noted the epidemic was started by a "confluence of circumstances" rather than the fault of any specific group or individual, while the 2013 follow-up, responding to new genomic data, definitively identified UN peacekeepers as the most likely source based on new genomic data. Genomic studies by Chen-Shan Chin, Paul Keim, and René Hendriksen had confirmed a near-identical match between Haitian and Nepalese strains. Frerichs also follows Timothy McGirk's investigative work at the UC Berkeley Investigative Reporting Program. Former Haitian health minister Alex Larsen later told Piarroux what had happened on October 17, 2010. The replacement sanitation-truck driver contracted by the UN who empties the nearby human waste disposal pit of the UN peacekeepers, finding the regular disposal site full, dumped the septic load into the tributary stream flowing to the large Artibonite River and then on from the interior to the sea, infecting nearby communities.

Piarroux's team pursued cholera elimination in 2013–2014: Stanislas Rebaudet, Aaron Aruna Abedi, and Sandy Moore of Aix-Marseille Université, along with Édouard Beigbeder of UNICEF. They focused on dry-season case detection, household chlorination, water-pipe repair, and selective rather than mass vaccination. Their approach contrasted with the Haitian government's ten-year, $2.2 billion sanitation plan, only thirteen percent funded by December 2014. Ban Ki-moon visited Mirebalais in July 2014, calling the trip a "necessary pilgrimage" and speaking of a "moral duty" to help eliminate cholera. The UN then appointed Pedro Medrano Rojas as senior coordinator and made cholera vaccination mandatory for peacekeepers from endemic areas. These developments fill the "Rapprochement" chapter. Cholera returned to Port-au-Prince in late 2014. The WHO Executive Board voted in January 2015 to overhaul emergency capacity. That same month, Judge J. Paul Oetken dismissed the Institute for Justice and Democracy in Haiti's lawsuit for cholera victims on immunity grounds. These events and more fill the 2015-24 epilogue.

Frerichs poses a final question: "Why is it important to know exactly how a disease outbreak began?" His answer: "knowing the source directs what should be done to prevent similar outbreaks in the future."

== Critics ==
J. Glenn Morris Jr., former CDC employee and CDC grant holder, and long-term co-author with Colwell in support of the environmental theory, agreed that Nepalese MINUSTAH peacekeepers had introduced cholera into Haiti. He, however, thought the book partisan, focusing mainly on Piarroux's work and conclusions. The underlying scientific dispute, he argued, was complex. It pitted proponents of person-to-person transmission against supporters of the environmental "cholera paradigm" associated with Rita Colwell. In his estimation, "the truth undoubtedly lies somewhere in the middle." He faulted the book's "tendency to see all events (and science) from the viewpoint of a single investigator/investigative group." The book did serve as a record from Piarroux's perspective, Morris said. But its focus on "possible cover-ups and 'suspect theories'" did not help the cholera research community resolve the controversy.

Laura Price recommended the book to all public health students and called Piarroux's investigation "fascinating." For Price, two sections of Frerichs's book stood out. One laid out political and institutional resistance to identifying the source. Early statements from WHO and CDC spokespersons had argued that the cause need not be discovered. The other laid out the competing environmental theory, which implied cholera in Haiti could only be controlled, never eliminated. Price reproduced long passages from Frerichs's introduction, calling it an excellent summary. The book, she wrote, carried two stories: a scientific investigation and high-level attempts "to obscure and deny UN responsibility."

Jocalyn Clark found that the disease part in the book is fascinating, and stated that Frerichs details amazing scientific disagreements between world-renowned cholera experts who take diﬀerent positions on how Vibrio cholerae had arrived in the country. She also opined that the detective part is compelling, especially as Piarroux’s search for clues to the origin of the outbreak met with resistance. She notes that Frerichs writes with incredible detail, based on document analyses, news reports, and interviews, the political maneuvering by powerful organizations such as the UN and its peace keeping oﬃcials, WHO, and the US Centers for Disease Control and Prevention (CDC), which led to the concealment of facts. Finally, she cites the book as a tour de force, a lesson in the politics of health, and essential reading for anyone interested in cholera, epidemics, or global health and development.

Sara E. Davies found the book as much a political study of the scientific community and the aid industry as an epidemiological one. She had doubts about the case for a deliberate, coordinated UN cover-up. The United Nations, she noted, is "a pathological entity that rarely thinks or acts as one." But she considered the evidence on the WHO's and OCHA's "curious positions" persuasive. The absence of pre-deployment medical screening of the Nepalese contingent disturbed her. The book's lessons reached beyond Haiti to the responses to Ebola in West Africa, Zika in South America, and Yellow Fever in central Africa. The work offered "no happy ending," she wrote, since no government, UN agency, or troop-contributing country had yet faced consequences for the failure to investigate the cause.

Tine Hanrieder called the book an excellent introduction to epidemiological methods for non-specialists. She also found it a careful account that won the reader over through repetition and accumulation of detail. The narrative form, she wrote, resembled "the TV detective Columbo," where the suspect is identified at the outset and the evidence is built around a strong initial suspicion. A Sherlock Holmes story, by contrast, has an open-ended structure. She thought the book made a compelling case against the double standards behind calling cholera Haiti's natural fate. Still, she wanted more on the political dimension.

Mark Schuller called the work "a genuine detective story about a timely and urgent topic written intelligently by a scientist who does not talk down to us." Schuller found the book accessible to non-specialists and agreed that the UN's obstruction of efforts to assume responsibility was systematic. This obstruction included the academic "careerist hubris" of a U.S. researcher whose environmental thesis, in his view, cost Haitian lives. He pointed out the absence of interviews with official UN sources. Haitian public-health, water, and sanitation professionals, he wrote, sat at the margins of the narrative. The single-page treatment of the twenty-year transition that led to the 2004 ouster of Aristide struck him as too thin and partisan. Still, he called the work a "must read" for foreigners working in Haiti and for everyone in the UN system, "from Secretary General to front-line workers."
