= J. Anthony Lukas Work-in-Progress Award =

Annual literary award

- Description: Grant to aid in the completion of significant non-fiction works
- Country: United States
- Presented by: Columbia University School of Journalism & Nieman Foundation
- Rewards: $25,000 (Winner); $5,000 (Finalist)
- Website: journalism.columbia.edu/lukas

The J. Anthony Lukas Work-in-Progress Award, established in 1999, is a literary award "given annually to aid in the completion of a significant work of nonfiction on a topic of American political or social concern." The prize is given by the Nieman Foundation and by the Columbia University School of Journalism and is intended to "assist in closing the gap between the time and money an author has and the time and money that finishing a book requires.

Every year, one or two award winners receive an award of at least $25,000, and a finalist may receive a $5,000 award. Shortlisted books, introduced in 2016, receive no monetary award.

== Recipients ==
Titles listed below are the named titles in the J. Anthony Lukas Work-in-Progress Awards documents. Because the books are listed as in-progress, the book titles may have changed after publication. When applicable, the published book has been linked.

Award winners and finalists
Year	Author	Title	Result	Ref.
1999	Kevin Coyne	The Best Years of Their Lives: One Town’s Veterans and How They Changed the World	Winner	
2000	James Tobin	Work of the Wind: A Remarkable Family, an Overlooked Genius, and the Race for Flight	Winner	
2000	Larry Tye		Finalist	
2000	Laura Bridgman		Finalist	
2001	Max Holland	A Need to Know: Inside the Warren Commission	Winner	
2001	Elinor Langer		Finalist	
2002	Jacques Leslie	On Dams	Winner	
2002	Harry Bruinius		Finalist	
2002	Richard Steven Street		Finalist	
2003	Suzannah Lessard	Mapping the New World: An Inquiry into the Meaning of Sprawl	Winner	
2003	Orlando Figes		Finalist	
2003	Steven Stoll		Finalist	
2004	John Bowe	Slavery Inc.	Winner	
2004	Eyal Press		Finalist	
2004	Beryl Satter		Finalist	
2005	Joan Quigley	Home Fires	Winner	
2005	Amy Bach		Finalist	
2005	Steven Greenhouse		Finalist	
2006	Laura Claridge	Emily Post and the Rise of Practical Feminism	Winner	
2006	Bruce Barcott		Finalist	
2006	Dudley Clendinen		Finalist	
2007	Robert Whitaker	Twelve Condemned to Die: Scipio Africanus Jones and The Struggle for Justice That Remade a Nation	Winner	
2007	Michael Punke		Finalist	
2008	Michelle Goldberg	The Means of Reproduction	Winner	
2008	Lyanda Lynn Haupt		Finalist	
2008	Cecilia Balli		Finalist	
2009	Judy Pasternak	Yellow Dirt: The Betrayal of the Navajos	Winner	
2010	Jonathan Schuppe	Ghetto Ball: A Coach, His Team, and the Struggle of an American City	Winner	
2010	David Philipps		Finalist	
2011	Alex Tizon	Big Little Man: The Asian Male at the Dawn of the Asian Century	Winner	
2011	Joe Mozingo	The Fiddler on Pantico Run	Finalist	
2011	Florence Williams	Breasts: A Natural and Unnatural History	Finalist	
2012	Jonathan M. Katz	The Big Truck That Went By: How the World Came to Save Haiti and Left Behind a Disaster	Winner	
2012	Susan Southard		Finalist	
2013	Beth Macy	Factory Man	Winner	
2013	Jim Robbins		Finalist	
2014	Adrienne Berard	When Yellow Was Black: The untold story of the first fight for desegregation in Southern schools	Winner	
2014	Yochi J. Dreazen		Finalist	
2015	Dan Egan	Liquid Desert: Life and Death of the Great Lakes	Winner	
2015	Heather Ann Thompson		Finalist	
2016	Steve Luxenberg	Separate: A Story of Race, Ambition and the Battle That Brought Legal Segregation to America	Winner	
2016	Blaire Briody		Finalist	
2016	Sasha Issenberg		Shortlist	
2016	Steve Oney		Shortlist	
2016	Meredith Wadman		Shortlist	
2017	Christopher Leonard	Kochland	Winner	
2017	Helen Thorpe	The Newcomers	Finalist	
2017	Marie Mutsuki Mockett		Shortlist	
2017	Eyal Press		Shortlist	
2017	Richard Steven Street		Shortlist	
2018	Chris Hamby	Soul Full of Coal Dust: The True Story of An Epic Battle for Justice	Winner	
2018	Rachel Louise Snyder	No Visible Bruises: What We Don't Know About Domestic Violence Can Kill Us	Winner	
2018	Arthur Holland Michel	Eyes in the Sky	Shortlist	
2018	Katherine E. Standefer	Lightning Flowers	Shortlist	
2018	Susan Vinocour	Nobody's Child: A Tragedy, a Trial, and the History of the Insanity Defense	Shortlist	
2019	Maurice Chammah	Let the Lord Sort Them: Texas and the Death Penalty's Rise and Fall in America	Winner	
2019	Steven Dudley	Mara: The Making of the MS13	Winner	
2019	Amelia Pang	Made in China: How an Engineer Ended Up in a Chinese Gulag Making Products for Kmart	Shortlist	
2019	Lauren Sandler	This Is All I Got: One Woman’s Desperate Year in the New Gilded Age	Shortlist	
2019	Sarah Schulman	Let the Record Show: ACT UP and the Enduring Relationship of AIDS	Shortlist	
2020	Bartow J. Elmore	Seed Money: Monsanto’s Past and the Future of Food	Winner	
2020	Shahan Mufti	American Caliph: The True Story of the Hanafi Siege, America’s First Homegrown Islamic Terror Attack	Winner	
2020	Michelle Nijhuis	Beloved Beasts: The Story of Conservation and the Fight to Protect Life on Earth	Shortlist	
2020	Sarah Schulman	Let the Record Show: A Political History of the AIDS Coalition to Unleash Power, ACT UP, NY 1987-1993	Shortlist	
2020	Lawrence Tabak	Foxconned: How the Mindless Pursuit of Good Jobs Destroys Homes, Wastes Billions and Enriches the Few	Shortlist	
2021	Emily Dufton	Addiction, Inc.: How the Corporate Takeover of America’s Treatment Industry Created a Profitable Epidemic	Winner	
2021	Casey Parks	Diary of a Misfit	Winner	
2021	David Dennis Jr.	The Movement Made Us	Shortlist	
2021	Channing Gerard Joseph	House of Swann: Where Slaves Became Queens — and Changed the World	Shortlist	
2021	Elizabeth Rush	The Mother of All Things: On Climate Change, the Stories We Tell, and a Journey to the Edge of Antarctica	Shortlist	
2022	Roxanna Asgarian	We Were Once a Family: The Hart Murder-Suicide and the System Failing Our Kids	Winner	
2022	May Jeong	The Life: Sex, Work, and Love in America	Winner	
2022	Robert Fieseler	American Scare: A Cold War in the Sunshine State	Finalist	
2022	Benjamin Herold	Disillusioned: How the Suburbs and Their Schools Undermine The American Dream	Finalist	
2022	Suki Kim	The Prince and the Revolutionary: Children of War	Finalist	
2023	Jesselyn Cook	The Quiet Damage: QAnon and the Destruction of the American Family	Winner	
2023	Mike Hixenbaugh	Uncivil: One Town's Fight Over Race and Identity, and the New Battle for America's Schools	Winner	
2023	Rebecca Kelliher		Shortlist	
2023	Megan Kimble		Shortlist	
2023	Jessica Pishko		Shortlist	
2024	Lorraine Boissoneault	Body Weather: Notes on Illness in the Anthropocene	Winner	
2024	Alice Driver	The Life and Death of the American Worker: The Immigrants Taking on America’s Largest Meatpacking Company	Winner	
2025	Susie Cagle	The End of the West	Shortlist	
2025	Dan Xin Huang	Rutter: The Story of an American Underclass	Shortlist	
2025	Akemi Johnson	Better Americans: In Search of My Family’s Past in America’s Concentration Camps	Shortlist	
2025	J. Weston Phippen	We Want Them Alive: The True Story of a Massacre on the Border, and the Mothers Who Exposed a U.S. Deal that Trained the Killers	Shortlist	
2025	Joe Sexton	Life or Death: Justice and Mercy in the Age of the School Shooter	Shortlist	
2026	danah boyd	Data Are Made, Not Found: A Story of Politics, Power, and the Civil Servants Who Saved the U.S. Census	Winner	
2026	Karim Zidan	In the Shadow of the Cage	Winner	

== See also ==
- J. Anthony Lukas Book Prize
- Mark Lynton History Prize
