= Janesville =

Janesville is the name of several places in the United States of America:

- Janesville, California
- Janesville, Illinois
- Janesville, Iowa
- Janesville, Minnesota
- Janesville, Wisconsin
- Janesville (town), Wisconsin
- Janesville Township, Minnesota

Janesville may also refer to:

- Janesville: An American Story, a book by Amy Goldstein

== See also ==
- Janeville, a community in Gloucester County, New Brunswick, Canada
- Jamesville (disambiguation)
