= Jenny Nordberg =

Jenny Nordberg is a New York-based, Swedish journalist best known for her book The Underground Girls of Kabul: In Search of a Hidden Resistance in Afghanistan (ISBN 978-0307952493) published by Crown Publishing Group (New York, NY) in 2014.

== Life ==
She has B.A. from Stockholm University in Law and Journalism and an M.A. from Columbia University in Journalism in 2003. She is a foreign correspondent for Swedish newspaper Svenska Dagbladet.

She is also a writer and producer of documentary films on topics such as nuclear proliferation in Pakistan, refugees in Iraq, and how the 2008 financial crisis affected Europe.

== Awards ==
- Winner of the 2015 J. Anthony Lukas Book Prize (for The Underground Girls of Kabul)
- Salon 2014 Authors' Favorite Book (for The Underground Girls of Kabul)
- BuzzFeed's Best Nonfiction Books of 2014 (for The Underground Girls of Kabul)
- A Business Insider Best Book of 2014 (for The Underground Girls of Kabul)
- A Columbus Dispatch Best Book of 2014 (for The Underground Girls of Kabul)
- A Publishers Weekly Best Book of 2014 (for The Underground Girls of Kabul)
- A PopMatters Best Book of 2014 (for The Underground Girls of Kabul)
- An FP Interrupted Best Book of 2014 (for The Underground Girls of Kabul)
- An IPI Global Observatory Recommended Book for 2015 (for The Underground Girls of Kabul)
- A Truthdig Book of the Year, 2014 (for The Underground Girls of Kabul)
- Finalist for the Goodreads Choice Award, Nonfiction (for The Underground Girls of Kabul)
- Robert F. Kennedy Award for Excellence in Journalism, Robert F. Kennedy Center for Justice and Human Rights, 2010, for television documentary of Afghan women
- Investigative Reporters and Editors award
- Foreningen Gravande Journalister award
