= Ralph R. Frerichs =

American epidemiologist

- Born: October 3, 1942 (age 84); Berlin, Germany
- Education: DVM University of Illinois College of Veterinary Medicine; MPH & DrPH Tulane University School of Public Health and Tropical Medicine
- Occupation: Epidemiologist
- Spouse: Rita Flynn
- Children: Peter and Christine

Ralph R. Frerichs is professor emeritus of epidemiology at UCLA where he was active as a full-time faculty member in the School of Public Health for 31 years and as the Epidemiology department chair for 13 years, before retiring in late 2008. Both at UCLA and in international workshops he taught epidemiologic methods, the use of rapid community-based surveys, epidemiologic simulation models for focused research, and screening and surveillance methods for HIV/AIDS and other diseases.

In addition, he consulted on epidemiological and management-related issues with many international agencies including the Albert Schweitzer Foundation, Population Council, UN, WHO, USAID and CDC in 16 countries:Colombia, Bolivia, Honduras, Brazil, Kenya, Bangladesh, Myanmar (formerly Burma), Thailand, Laos, Cambodia, Vietnam, Indonesia, Philippines, Mongolia, Federated States of Micronesia and the country of Georgia.

Since retirement, he authored Deadly River: Cholera and Cover-up in Post-Earthquake Haiti (Cornell University Press, 2016), is engaged in panoramic photography, and continues to manage the popular John Snow website, which he created to honor the historical father of epidemiology, known for his insightful research on cholera.

== Life and career ==
Frerichs was born on October 3, 1942, in Berlin, Germany, the son of physicist Rudolf Frerichs known for development of the cadmium-sulfide photoconductive cell, and artist and writer Gisela Frerichs. The family moved to the United States in 1947–48, where his father joined the faculty of Northwestern University in Evanston, Illinois. Frerichs obtained his DVM in 1967 from the University of Illinois College of Veterinary Medicine at Urbana-Champaign. Following two years in Birmingham, Alabama, as captain in the US Army Veterinary Corp, he obtained the MPH and DrPH (epidemiology) in 1970 and 1973, respectively from Tulane University School of Public Health and Tropical Medicine in New Orleans. While working on his doctoral dissertation (development of a computer simulation model for the control of urban rabies) he was both a research associate with the International Center for Medical Research and Training in Cali, Colombia and an instructor at Tulane University. After graduation, Frerichs became assistant professor of preventive medicine at the LSU School of Medicine in New Orleans, and epidemiologist for the Bogalusa Heart Study, a longitudinal study of cardiovascular disease risk factors in children in the biracial community of Bogalusa, Louisiana. During his LSU years from 1973 to 1977, his publication topics included pediatric levels of blood cholesterol and triglyceride levels, lipoproteins, blood pressure, hemoglobin. and obesity.

In early 1978, Frerichs joined the epidemiology faculty at UCLA, rising through the ranks from assistant to full professor, while expanding his research interests both domestically and internationally. Nationally, he focused on airport noise and mortality, mental depression, spatial patterns of cardiovascular disease mortality, and the health impact of recycled wastewater. Globally, his research included health status measures and costs of care in Bolivia, microcomputer applications in Bangladesh, Burma and elsewhere, and pediatric health indicators in Burma. While in Burma (later renamed Myanmar), he developed an approach for quickly conducting community-based surveys, which soon became a component of international surveillance systems. Several years later he introduced a more advanced form of the rapid survey method for use in the United States.

Becoming increasing involved with HIV/AIDS, he realized the need for a simple saliva test to assist screening and surveillance activities. His 1994 call in The Lancet for personal HIV screening in developing countries invoked controversy during a time when detection was viewed as worse than the disease, as did his Epidemiology commentary on HIV winners and losers, and his AIDS article on the harm of not permitting personal HIV screening in developing countries. Controversy continued in his retirement years, when he wrote of the United Nations involvement in the origin of the world's largest cholera epidemic in Haiti, later expanded in his book Deadly River featuring French epidemiologist Renaud Piarroux.

Honors included the Delta Omega Public Health Honor Society (1970); the American Epidemiological Society (1982, an honorary society of epidemiologists since 1927); UC Berkeley's 1988 invitation as Ralph Sachs Visiting Scholar for his work in computer technology in developing countries; outstanding alumnus in 1992 of Tulane's School of Public Health and Tropical Medicine; and in 1997 the Prestigious Plaque for HIV/AIDS Education from Thailand's Ministry of Public Health and Bangkok's College of Public Health at Chulalongkorn University.

Professor Frerichs has two adult children, Peter and Christine and one grandson, Michael. He was married in Florence, Italy to Rita J. Flynn, following the death of wife Marcy M. Frerichs after 34 years of marriage. The couple resides in Sierra Madre, California at the base of the San Gabriel Mountains.
