= Jessica Nordell =

American writer

Jessica (Jess, J.D.) Nordell is an American writer, poet, science journalist, and author.

== Early life and education ==
Nordell was born in Los Angeles, California and raised in Green Bay, Wisconsin. Nordell attended MIT and received a B.A. in physics from Harvard University. She later earned a certificate in visual art from the Minneapolis College of Art and Design and an MFA in poetry from the University of Wisconsin-Madison, where she was the Martha Meier Renk Distinguished Poetry Fellow.

== Writing ==
Her science journalism and writings on bias, prejudice, and discrimination have appeared in The New York Times, The Atlantic, The Guardian, The Washington Post, The New Republic, Slate, and Salon.

Nordell's first book The End of Bias: A Beginning (The Science and Practice of Overcoming Unconscious Bias) was a finalist for the 2021 Royal Society Science Book Prize, the 2022 J. Anthony Lukas Prize for Excellence in Nonfiction, and the 2022 NYPL Helen Bernstein Book Award for Excellence in Journalism. It also won a Nautilus Award and was a finalist for the American Society of Journalists and Authors and the National Association of Science Writers Book Award. It was named a best book of the year by Greater Good, Inc., and AARP.

Earlier in her career, Nordell was a staff comedy writer from 2003-2005 for A Prairie Home Companion a live radio variety show hosted by Garrison Keillor. While on staff, she co-created and produced the interview series Literary Friendships, featuring writer pairs Michael Chabon and Ayelet Waldman, Sandra Cisneros and Joy Harjo, Michael Cunningham and Marie Howe, Robert Bly and Donald Hall, and Dana Gioia and Kay Ryan. The series won a 2006 Gracie Award from American Women in Radio and Television. From 2006-2007, Nordell was associate producer for On Being with Krista Tippett.

Nordell's poetry collection was a finalist for the 2026 Agnes Lynch Starrett Poetry Prize from the University of Pittsburgh Press, selected by Terrance Hayes. Her poems have appeared in The Yale Review, Conduit, FIELD, Best New Poets. Her essay "Another One Rides the Cometbus," an appreciation of Aaron Cometbus's Cometbus magazine, appeared in the essay collection Before the Mortgage: Real Stories of Brazen Loves, Broken Leases, and the Perplexing Pursuit of Adulthood.

== Publications ==
Books
The End of Bias: A Beginning: How We Eliminate Unconscious Bias and Create a More Just World
Selected Writings on Bias and Discrimination

Articles

- This is How Everyday Sexism Could Stop You From Getting That Promotion, New York Times (October, 2021)
- Is This How Discrimination Ends? Atlantic (April, 2017)
- The Visitor, The New York Times (November, 2008)
- Positions of Power: How female ambition is shaped, Slate.com (November, 2006)
