= Lyndsie Bourgon =

Canadian author and oral historian (born 17 September 1986)

- Born: 1986 (age 39–40); Calgary, Alberta, Canada
- Education: University of King's College University of St Andrews
- Occupations: Author, Oral Historian
- Notable work: Tree Thieves: Crime and Survival in North America's Woods

Lyndsie Rae Bourgon, FRCGS (born 1986) is a Canadian author and oral historian based in Halifax, Nova Scotia. She is a National Geographic explorer, a Fellow of the Royal Canadian Geographical Society, and a Fellow International of The Explorers Club.

== Life ==
Bourgon was born in Calgary, Alberta, and raised in the small border town of Milk River, Alberta.

As an undergraduate at the University of King's College she was editor-in-chief of the student newspaper The Watch, and she held internships and fellowships with CBC News, the Canadian Press, the World University Service of Canada, and the Pearson Peacekeeping Centre.

She has written for Canadian publications including Maisonneuve, Hazlitt, and The Walrus, and has been nominated for two Canadian National Magazine Awards. In 2012 she lived in an off-the-grid cabin along the North Beach of Haida Gwaii, during which she wrote about Haida artifact repatriation, traditional carving, and the Northern Gateway Pipeline.

In 2017, she graduated from the University of St Andrews with a degree in environmental history and oral history. Her oral history work focuses on traditional land use studies in rural and difficult-to-access regions, such as the Shetland islands in northern Scotland, the Peruvian Amazon, and communities in northern Canada. Her interviews with the Tkʼemlúps te Secwépemc influenced the community's response to the search for unmarked burials at the former Kamloops Indian Residential School. Her expertise has been drawn upon by the Crown-Indigenous Relations and Northern Affairs Canada and Environment and Climate Change Canada agencies. She has presented her work to audiences at the University of Oxford and Yale University, as well as the Oral History Society and Forest History Society.

== Books ==
In June 2022, Bourgon's first book, Tree Thieves: Crime and Survival in North America's Woods, was published by Little, Brown Spark (US), Greystone Books (Canada), and Hodder & Stoughton (UK). Tree Thieves examines the history of poaching and investigates timber theft in the Pacific Northwest and around the world. It received favorable reviews in The New York Times, the San Francisco Chronicle, Science, The London Telegraph, The Times Literary Supplement, and on NPR's Science Friday. It was named a New York Times Editors' Choice. In 2023, Bourgon wrote about the death of one of her sources for the Guardian.

Tree Thieves was nominated for the PEN America/Kenneth R. Galbraith Non-Fiction Award, the J. Anthony Lukas Book Prize, the Banff Mountain Film Festival Environmental Literature Award, the BC and Yukon Book Prizes Hubert Evans Non-Fiction Prize, and received an honourable mention for the Society of Environmental Journalists Rachel Carson Environment Book Award. Since publication, it has been chosen by The Guardian as one of the five best books about trees.
