= The Underground Girls of Kabul =

2014 book by Jenny Nordberg

- Author: Jenny Nordberg
- Subject: Bacha posh
- Published: 2014
- Pages: 350 pp.
- Awards: 2015 J. Anthony Lukas Book Prize; Salon 2014 Authors' Favorite Book; Buzzfeed's Best Nonfiction Books of 2014; A Business Insider Best Book of 2014; A Columbus Dispatch Best Book of 2014; A Publishers Weekly Best Book of 2014; A PopMatters Best Book of 2014; An FP Interrupted Best Book of 2014; An IPI Global Observatory Recommended Book for 2015; A TruthDig Book of the Year, 2014; Finalist for the Goodreads Choice Award, Nonfiction
- ISBN: 0-307-95249-5
- OCLC: 851420427
- Website: http://theundergroundgirlsofkabul.com/

The Underground Girls of Kabul: in Search of a Hidden Resistance in Afghanistan is a book by Jenny Nordberg that documents the bacha posh of Afghanistan. Bacha posh translates from Dari as "dressed up like a boy." It is a term used in Afghanistan and in this book to describe children who are born as girls but are dressed up, raised and treated as if they were boys. The girls will usually serve as a son for the family until she hits puberty. However, the book also delves deeper into those bacha posh that remain boys even after puberty. It is written by journalist and foreign correspondent Jenny Nordberg and was published on 16 September 2014. It was later released on 30 September in the UK.

== Synopsis ==
The book follows the stories of many women who are or who have been bacha posh. It also offers the insight of mothers considering bacha posh for their newborn daughters. Some families who have only a daughter or multiple daughters will designate their children as sons instead. The communities in which they live are often tolerant of this for the span of their childhood.

The experiences of these individuals give personal accounts of how some women handle the treatment of girls in modern day Afghanistan. There is tremendous importance placed on being male or having male children. To grow up as a boy instead of as a girl in Afghanistan offers the child freedom and autonomy that young girls do not have access to. Oftentimes the mother is judged as well for not bearing a son.

== Characters ==
Azita is a middle class mother of four daughters. Her fourth daughter, Mehran, is to become a bacha posh. She buys her clothing and a haircut to fit her new identity as a six-year-old boy. Azita wants to give Mehran the freedom to play sports, open communication, and activities that young boys can enjoy. Additionally, Azita herself was a bacha posh as a young girl, which allows her a deeper insight into their plight within Afghanistan.

Zahra is a teenage bacha posh. She does not enjoy the treatment of Afghan women and wishes to remain a boy. She defies her parents’ attempt to transition her into womanhood. Zahra wants to hold onto the freedoms she is given as a boy, and wishes to work and support herself without marriage or a family.

== Censorship ==
The Underground Girls of Kabul is one of the 850's targeted books in a watch list sent public-school libraries by Matt Krause, a Republican member of the Texas House of Representatives, as prone to generate "discomfort, guilt, anguish, or any other form of psychological distress because of [a student’s] race or sex". It was one of 381 books removed from the U.S. Naval Academy's Nimitz Library in April 2025, along with other books addressing topics of race and gender.
