= Scott Ellsworth (author) =

American writer and historian

Scott Allen Ellsworth
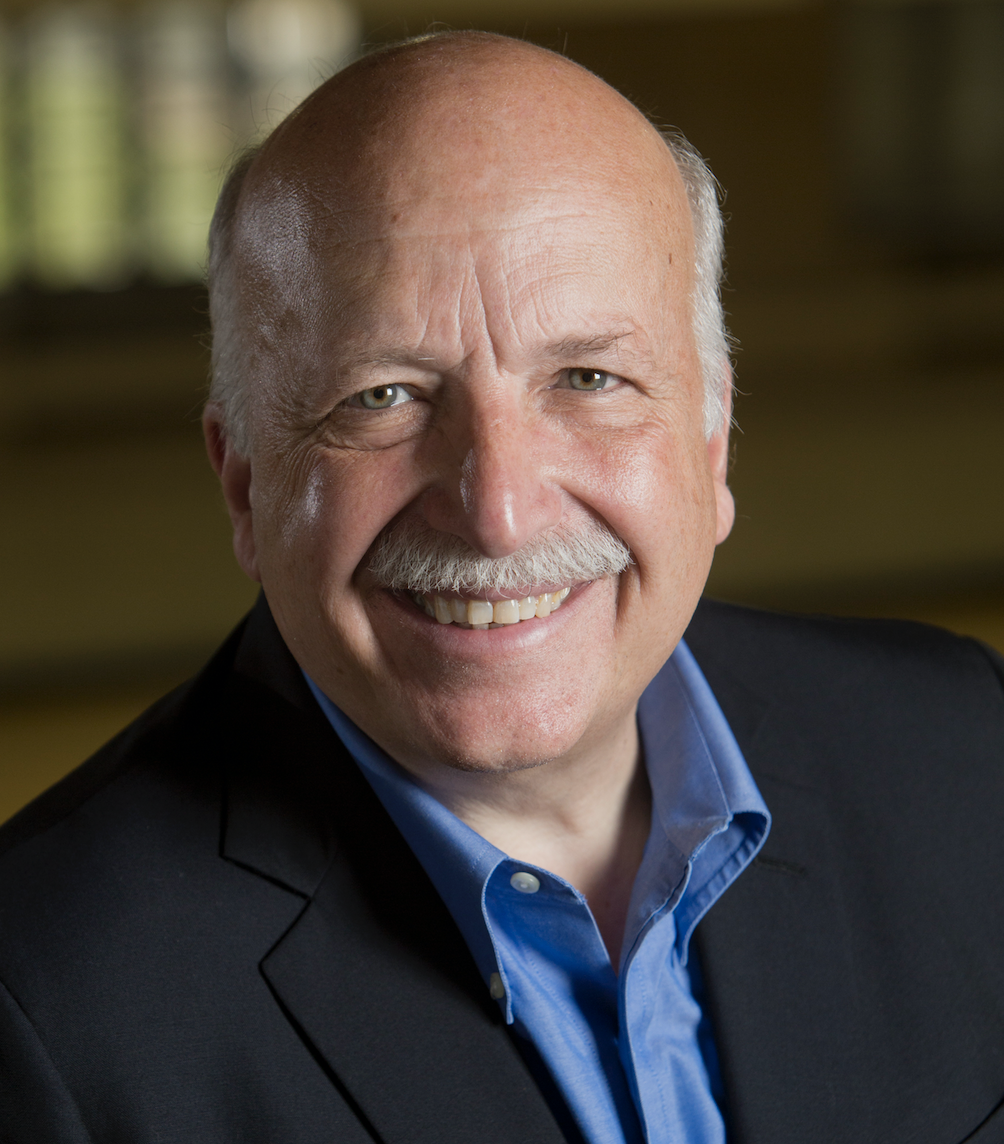
- Photo of Scott Ellsworth by Jared Lazarus/Duke University (2015)
- Born: Scott Allen Ellsworth; March 17, 1954 (age 72); Tulsa, Oklahoma, U.S.
- Education: Reed College (BA); Duke University (MA, PhD)
- Occupations: Writer and historian
- Notable work: Death in a Promised Land: The Tulsa Race Riot of 1921; The Secret Game; The Ground Breaking
- Spouse: Elizabeth Wade Stephens (m. 1993)
- Website: https://www.scottellsworthauthor.com/

Scott Allen Ellsworth (born March 17, 1954) is an American writer and historian. He is the author of The Secret Game (2015), The Ground Breaking (2021), and other award-winning works of narrative non-fiction. Ellsworth and his research into the Tulsa race massacre are credited with ensuring the tragedy has become embedded in popular culture.

== Early life and education ==
Ellsworth was born and raised in Tulsa, Oklahoma. Educated in the Tulsa Public Schools, he studied history at Reed College, graduating in 1976. He earned his M.A. and Ph.D. in history from Duke University, where he was also a member of the Duke Oral History Program.

== Career ==
Ellsworth published his first book, Death in a Promised Land: The Tulsa Race Riot of 1921 (1982) when he was twenty-seven and was living in Washington, D.C. After teaching briefly at both Howard University and George Mason University, he worked for a decade as a historian at the Smithsonian Institution and has been involved over the years with various film and public history projects. Ellsworth has written about American history, culture, and politics for the New York Times, Washington Post, Los Angeles Times, and other publications. He’s taught at the University of Michigan since 2007.

== Tulsa Race Massacre ==
After hearing stories as a child about racial violence in Tulsa in 1921, Ellsworth began researching the massacre for his senior thesis at Reed College, which he later turned into Death in a Promised Land. Based on both traditional archival research and on interviews with elderly massacre survivors, the book was the first-ever comprehensive history of what was the single worst incident of racial violence in American history, one which resulted in more than 1000 African American homes and businesses being looted and burned to the ground by white mobs, while an unknown number of people were killed. In 2021, Ellsworth published The Ground Breaking: An American City and Its Search for Justice, the story of how the history of the massacre had been suppressed for more than fifty years, and how the story finally came to light. The Ground Breaking was longlisted for the National Book Award for Nonfiction, the Carnegie Medal, and the Harriet Beecher Stowe Book Award for Literary Activism. While serving as a historian for the Tulsa Race Riot Commission, Ellsworth initiated the search for the unmarked graves of massacre victims in 1999, and remains involved in the ongoing search.

== The Secret Game ==
In the 1990s, while researching a proposed book about the history of basketball, Ellsworth uncovered the existence of a clandestine, integrated college basketball game that took place in Durham, North Carolina in 1944. The game, which featured the Eagles of the North Carolina College for Negroes versus an all-white wartime basketball team from the Duke University Medical School, not only directly defied segregation practices in the South, but was a precursor to the Civil Rights Movement. Ellsworth’s book, The Secret Game: A Wartime Story of Courage, Change, and Basketball’s Lost Triumph (2015) won the 2016 PEN/ESPN Award for Literary Sports Writing, while Booklist called Ellsworth “a historian with the soul of a poet.”

== The World Beneath Their Feet ==
Drawing upon his own mountaineering experience, in 2020 Ellsworth published The World Beneath Their Feet: Mountaineering, Madness, and the Deadly Race to Summit the Himalayas. Set against the backdrop of the coming of World War II and the rise of the Indian independence movement, the book charted the race between British, German, and American climbers to be the first to successfully climb the world’s highest and most treacherous mountains. Winner of the 2021 National Outdoor Book Award for History and Biography, and a finalist for the 2021 William Hill Sports Book of the Year, The World Beneath Their Feet has been translated into Italian, Polish, Czech, and Slovak editions.

== Midnight on the Potomac ==
Ellsworth’s fifth book, Midnight on the Potomac: The Last Year of the Civil War, the Lincoln Assassination, and the Rebirth of America, was published on July 15, 2025.

== Bibliography ==
- Death in a Promised Land: The Tulsa Race Riot of 1921 (1982)
- The Secret Game: A Wartime Story of Courage, Change, and Basketball’s Lost Triumph (2015)
- The World Beneath Their Feet: Mountaineering, Madness, and the Deadly Race to Summit the Himalayas (2020)
- The Ground Breaking: An American City and Its Search for Justice (2021)
- Midnight on the Potomac: The Last Year of the Civil War, the Lincoln Assassination, and the Rebirth of America (2025)
