= Jesselyn Cook =

Canadian journalist and non-fiction writer

Jesselyn Cook is a Canadian journalist and non-fiction writer. She is a Nieman Fellow.

== Career ==
Cook was initially a tech-focused journalist who wrote about the Internet's "dark corners". She has been researching and writing on the QAnon conspiracy theory since 2020. In 2024, Cook published The Quiet Damage, a book which profiles five QAnon believers, and how those beliefs impacted their families. The book won the J. Anthony Lukas Work-in-Progress Award in 2023.

== Works ==
=== Selected articles ===
- Cook, Jesselyn (2018-04-17). "Facebook Didn't Seem To Care I Was Being Sexually Harassed Until I Decided To Write About It". HuffPost.
- Cameron, Emily; Cook, Jesselyn (2018-05-22). "Ireland has some of the world's most restrictive abortion laws. A vote this week could dial them back". PBS News.
- Cook, Jesselyn (2021-02-11). "'I Miss My Mom': Children Of QAnon Believers Are Desperately Trying To Deradicalize Their Own Parents". HuffPost.
- Cook, Jesselyn (2022-05-23). "$166 for 6 cans of baby formula: Online price gouging is another blow for desperate parents". NBC News.
- Cook, Jesselyn (2022-06-07). "Family sues Meta, blames Instagram for daughter's eating disorder and self-harm". NBC News.
- Cook, Jesselyn (2023-03-14). "Senators seek answers from Pinterest after NBC News investigation". NBC News.

=== Books ===
- Cook, Jesselyn (2024-07-23). The Quiet Damage. New York: Crown. ISBN 978-0-593-44325-5.
