= Bacha posh =

Cultural practice in Afghanistan and Pakistan

Bacha posh (Pashto: باشا بوش, lit. 'dressed up as a boy', Dari: بچه‌ پوشی) is a practice in Afghanistan in which some families will pick a daughter to live and behave as a boy. This enables the child to behave more freely: attending school, escorting her sisters in public, and working. The practice is more common among families with a large number of daughters, particularly if there are no sons. Girls raised bacha posh typically resume living as a girl around the time they hit puberty, as it becomes more difficult for them to pass as a boy.

Families may choose to raise a daughter bacha posh so that she can earn an income, particularly in the absence of male relatives, to enable her mother and sisters greater freedom of movement, or due to preference for a son.

== Overview ==
In Afghanistan, there is societal pressure for families to have a son to carry on the family name and to inherit the father's property. Families with only daughters or few sons may be stigmatized and seen as weak.

In the absence of a son, families may dress one of their daughters as a male, with some adhering to the belief that having a bacha posh will make it more likely for a mother to give birth to a son in a subsequent pregnancy. If one of the daughters is a tomboy, she may be more likely to be chosen as bacha posh than her sisters; however, the choice is made by the family without the girl's input.

A girl living as a boy will dress in characteristic male clothing, have her hair cut short, and use a male name. Within her family, she will not need to cook or clean like other girls. As a bacha posh, a girl is more readily able to attend school, run errands, move freely in public, escort her sisters in places where they could not be without a male companion, play sports and find work.

The girl's status as a bacha posh usually ends when she enters puberty. Women raised as a bacha posh often have difficulty making the transition from life as a boy and adapting to the traditional constraints placed on women in Afghan society.

The role of a bacha posh in the community is complex. The child's community is often aware that she is a girl, but nonetheless acknowledges her as a boy. However, the fact that she is a girl is handled discreetly and not openly discussed. Open acknowledgement that she is a girl may bring shame upon her family or make her vulnerable to violence. While some girls raised bacha posh report no issues within the community when they transitioned back to living as a woman, there are also reports that families often move when she transitions so that her true identity is not openly revealed.

Azita Rafaat, a legislator elected to the National Assembly of Afghanistan to represent Badghis Province, has had no sons and has raised one of her daughters as a bacha posh. She said she understood that "it's very hard for you to believe why one mother is doing these things to their youngest daughter," and that "things are happening in Afghanistan that is really not imaginable for you as a Western people."

== Origins ==
The custom is documented at least one century ago, but is likely to be much older, and is still practiced today. It may have started with women disguising themselves as men to fight, or to be protected, during periods of wartime.

Historian Nancy Dupree told a reporter from The New York Times that she recalled a photograph dating back to the early 1900s during the reign of Habibullah Khan in which women dressed as men guarded the king's harem because officially, the harem could be guarded by neither women nor men. "Segregation calls for creativity," she said, "These people have the most amazing coping capability."

== Prevalence and acceptability ==
The cultural practice of bacha posh was originally non-publicized outside of the Middle East. However, as a result of media productions bacha posh and their role in society is slowly being revealed.

Research is limited on the prevalence of bacha posh. One self-selected study of women in the Kabul and Nangarhar provinces found that 7% of respondents reported that a girl in their family was raised bacha posh. There was a significant disparity between the two provinces, with 4.4% of Kabul and 15.4% of Nangarhar province respondents reporting bacha posh within their family. The study found much higher rates of bacha posh among Pashtuns than Tajiks or Hazaras, but the vast majority of Pashtun women reporting bacha posh were from the Nangarhar province, indicating that this result may be skewed by the demographics and socioeconomic conditions of the province.

Only the main family, family friends, and necessary health and education officials know the bacha posh's biological sex. It is tolerated and acknowledged by society in the main, and seen as a practical solution for those without an heir or accompanying male figure. Although it is tolerated, a bacha posh can be bullied and teased for not conforming to religious beliefs and social norms once discovered to be female. Once revealed, a bacha posh can receive stigmatization similar to that felt by the LGBT community, regardless of whether they identify as such.

== Effects ==
Developmental and clinical psychologist Diane Ehrensaft theorizes that, by behaving like boys, the bacha posh is not expressing their true gender identity, but simply conforming to parents' hopes and expectations. She cites parents offering their daughters privileges girls otherwise would not get, such as the chance to cycle and to play soccer and cricket, as well as bacha posh complaining that they are not comfortable around boys, and would rather live as a girl.

After having lived as bacha posh for some time though, most find it hard to socialize again with girls as they have become comfortable socializing with boys. One girl who was a bacha posh for twenty years, but switched back to being a girl when she entered university, told the BBC that she switched back only because of traditions of society. One reason it is so hard for a bacha posh to return to girlhood is that they act the role of a boy when they are supposed to be developing their personalities, so they end up developing more stereotypical masculine personality traits. Some bacha posh feel as if they've lost essential childhood memories and their identities as girls. Others feel that it was good to experience the freedoms that they would not have had if they'd been normal girls growing up in Afghanistan. The change itself can also be very hard as most, if not all, rights and privileges of the "boys" are taken away when transitioning back into a women's role; many women do not wish to go back upon experiencing the freedoms of a boy. Jenny Nordberg, author of The Underground Girls of Kabul, said that many do not return to live as women and that it is "very complicated psychologically" on an individual level.

When a bacha posh reaches marrying age, commonly at 15–17, and/or when their feminine forms become more pronounced, it is usually then that the father will decide to return the bacha posh to their female form again. Nevertheless, being a bacha posh of marriageable age, the women can have a say on the decision. However, if this means going against their father's wishes (and thereby, the family's wishes), the young bacha posh can end up further marginalized, without familial support in a highly family-oriented society. As the majority of bacha posh spend their prepubescent years in a male role, many skip learning the necessary skills to become the ideal wife. Subsequently, many experience anxiety over the transition to womanhood.

The heart of the controversy over this practice, in terms of the recent movement for Afghan women's rights, is whether the practice of bacha posh empowers women and helps them succeed or if the practice is psychologically damaging. Many of the women who have gone through the process say they feel that the experience was empowering as well as smothering. The true problem, activists say, is not the practice itself, but women's rights in that society.

== In media ==
- Nadia Hashimi's 2014 novel The Pearl that Broke Its Shell
- Jenny Nordberg's book The Underground Girls of Kabul: In Search of a Hidden Resistance in Afghanistan
- Iranian movie director Majid Majidi's 2001 film Baran.
- Osama, a 2003 Afghan film written and directed by Siddiq Barmak. It tells the story of a young girl in Afghanistan under Taliban rule who disguises herself as a boy, Osama, in order to support her family, as her father and uncle had both been killed during the Soviet-Afghan War, and she and her mother would not be able to travel on their own without a male "legal companion."
- Nadia Hashimi's 2016 children's novel One Half from the East
- The animated feature film The Breadwinner, 2017, from Deborah Ellis' 2001 children's book Parvana, is about a girl who dresses as a boy to support her family.
- A Second Birth by Ariel Mitchell. A play set in southern Afghanistan in which a family struggles with the tradition of bacha posh. New York City premiere: THML Theatre Company at The Center at West Park, March 1–24, 2019. Development, production history, awards.

== See also ==
- The Breadwinner
- Crossdressing
- Nadia Ghulam
