= Jamesville =

Jamesville can refer to

- Jamesville, Missouri
- Jamesville, New York
- Jamesville, North Carolina
- Jamesville, Pennsylvania
- Jamesville, Virginia
- Hamilton, Ontario has a neighborhood called Jamesville
- Yankton County, South Dakota has a township called Jamesville

== See also ==
- Janesville (disambiguation)
