= Nate Blakeslee =

American author and journalist

- Education: Southwestern University
- Occupations: Journalist; author

Nate Blakeslee is a journalist and author in the United States. He wrote a book about the 1999 drug arrests in Tulia, Texas about a corrupt lawman persecuting mostly African American residents, and a book about the O-Six, an American wolf. He has written for the Texas Observer and is a Senior Editor for Texas Monthly.

He is from Arlington, Texas and studied journalism in graduate school at Southwestern University in Georgetown, Texas. Film rights for his book on the Tulia drug busts and former NAACP lawyer Vanita Gupta's efforts in pursuit of justice were acquired in 2017.

== Writings ==
- Tulia: Race, Cocaine and Corruption in a Small Texas Town, Won the 2005 J. Anthony Lukas Book Prize for excellence in nonfiction and was a finalist for the PEN/Martha Albrand Award,
- American Wolf: A True Story of Survival and Obsession in the West, Crown, ISBN 978-1-101-90278-3

=== Articles ===
- "Alex Jones is About to Explode"
- "Can a Transgender Woman Get Justice in Texas?"
