= Diary of a Misfit =

2022 book by Casey Parks

Diary of a Misfit: A Memoir and a Mystery
- Author: Casey Parks
- Language: English
- Subject: Biography, gender identity, investigative reporting, lesbians, Louisiana, queer autobiographies, sexuality
- Set in: Louisiana, U.S.
- Publisher: Knopf
- Publication date: 2022-08-30
- Publication place: United States
- Pages: 368
- Awards: 2021 – J. Anthony Lukas Work-in-Progress Award
- ISBN: 9780525658535
- OCLC: 1268205823
- Website: http://diaryofamisfit.com

Diary of a Misfit: A Memoir and a Mystery is a memoir by American journalist Casey Parks. It was released on August 30, 2022, by Knopf. It was recommended by Publishers Weekly, them., Lithub, and others.

== Synopsis ==
The book weaves the story of journalist Casey Parks' queer identity and the life history of a man named Roy Hudgins that her grandmother knew growing up in Delhi, Louisiana in the 1950s. Roy was assigned female at birth yet lived as a man. Parks, who herself grew up poor in rural Louisiana, sets out to illuminate the history of Roy's life through interviews with those who knew him, while grappling with the rejection she faced after coming out as gay as an adolescent. Her relationship with her loving and devoutly Christian mother is also explored.

== Reception ==
In a starred review, Publishers Weekly described the book as "a brilliantly rendered and complex portrait of Southern life alongside a tender exploration of queer belonging. Parks's writing is a marvel to witness." In a similarly positive review, Yvonne Abraham praised the book in the Boston Globe: "The book is an immersive, expansive look at the world of small-town life and those who are forever marked by these spaces. Entwined in this nuanced narrative lies a thread regarding the challenge of empathy...This is a loving and unflinching portrait of a search for community, imperfect but constant. The Oregonian's Robert Allen Papinchak hailed the writing: "It is a master class in how to write an atypical, exemplary memoir. Parks reconstructs haunting and traumatic memories at the same time she focuses on objective investigative journalism, relying on the resources of interviews, photographs, library microfilm, and an elusive diary."

In a less positive review, Alana R. Quarles of Library Journal referred to the book as "less a journey of discovery and more the account of a complicated daughter-mother relationship laden with guilt and neglect." Michelle Hart of The New York Times praised "Parks's depiction of a queer lineage, her assertion of an ancestry of outcasts, a tapestry of fellow misfits into which the marginalized will always, for better or worse, fit. Our selves are so often an assemblage of the stories of those who came before."

Diary of a Misfit was recommended by the Southern Review of Books, Publishers Weekly, Literary Hub, The Philadelphia Inquirer, and them.

== Awards and nominations ==
- 2021 – J. Anthony Lukas Work-in-Progress Award

== Publication ==
- Parks, Casey (2022-08-30). Diary of a Misfit: A Memoir and a Mystery. Knopf. ISBN 9780525658535.
