= 1999 Tulia drug arrests =

Arrests for cocaine dealing in Texas, US

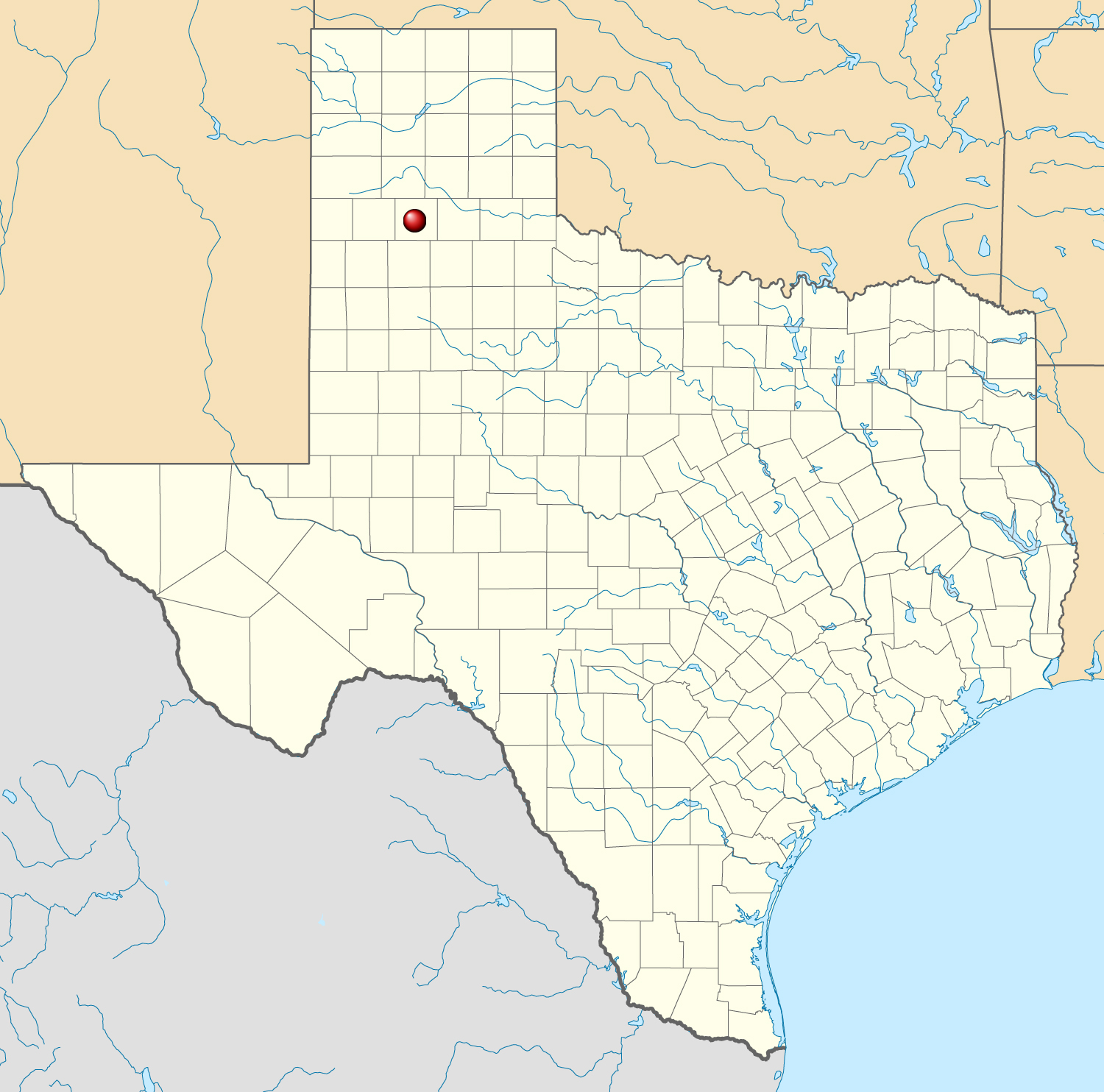
- Date: July 23, 1999
- Location: Tulia, Texas; 34°32′09″N 101°45′31″W
- Type: Police raid
- Participants: Tom Coleman (undercover as T. J. Dawson)
- Arrests: 47 (Note: Although the book titled Tulia: Race, Cocaine, and Corruption in a Small Texas Town by Nate Blakeslee quotes the number of arrested as forty-seven (with names given), there are other books that quote the number at forty-six (Without names).)
- Convicted: 38
- Charges: Delivery of a controlled substance
- Pardoned: 35

A total of 47 individuals, the majority of whom were African American, were arrested in 1999 in Tulia, Texas on charges of cocaine dealing as a result of an undercover operation carried out by agent Tom Coleman. Coleman's testimony was crucial in the convictions of 38 of the 47. Years later, 35 of the 38 incarcerated were pardoned by Texas governor Rick Perry. The story was widely covered by national media outlets such as The New York Times, 60 Minutes, People, and A&E Networks.

== Pretense ==
In 1994, as part of the United States' war on drugs, President Bill Clinton signed into law the Violent Crime Control and Law Enforcement Act. The first draft of the congressional bill was written by then-Senator Joe Biden of Delaware in cooperation with the National Association of Police Organizations and was sponsored by Representative Jack Brooks of Texas.

Nationwide, states received 100,000 new police officers, $9.7 billion in funding for prisons, and $6.1 billion in funding for prevention programs. In Tulia and small towns alike, task forces received funding for each arrest and conviction they made, which could be used as they pleased the following year.

== Undercover operation ==
Using the alias T. J. Dawson, agent Tom Coleman went undercover for 18 months, posing as a buyer who needed to purchase cocaine for his girlfriend. Coleman worked for the Panhandle Regional Narcotics Trafficking Task Force. He was hired by Sheriff Larry Stewart of Swisher County, Texas, in 1998, operating out of Amarillo.

On the morning of July 23, 1999, the Swisher County Sheriff's Department, in cooperation with local authorities, conducted a collective apprehension and arrest of 47 citizens in Tulia, Texas. Thirty-eight of the arrested were African American, which amounted to around 15 percent of Tulia's African American population.

After the highly publicized drug arrests in Tulia, Coleman was honored as Officer of the Year in Texas. He was photographed with John Cornyn, who was then the Texas Attorney General and later a U.S. Senator.

== Convictions ==
During his undercover operation in Tulia, Tom Coleman claimed to have purchased at least 117 illegal narcotics from 47 different defendants. Except for 21 defendants who were charged with the first-degree felony of selling drugs to Coleman within 1,000 feet (300 m) of a school or park, all other defendants were charged with second-degree felonies for the purchases made between February 1998 and July 1999.

This was in spite of Coleman not supplying any recorded materials, such as audio or videotape, or corroboration by second officers. There were also no drugs or weapons found in the initial raid. Coleman frequently wrote brief reports that included very little information about the defendants. He also identified suspects incorrectly in a few instances, resulting in dismissal of cases.

== Pardons ==
Sparked by a letter written by Gary Gardner, who was distraught by the lack of evidence, to District Judge Ed Self, Amarillo civil rights attorney Jeff Blackburn—along with Vanita Gupta from the NAACP Legal Defense and Educational Fund and a handful of attorneys from firms around the country—began investigating the Tulia defendants' cases. Eventually, the case became a cause célèbre, and money was raised to legally challenge the cases. Many had already served several years in prison before this process gained momentum. By 2004, Blackburn and his team had freed most of the accused and a $6,000,000 collective settlement was reached to avoid further litigation in civil court.

Of the 47 original defendants, Texas governor Rick Perry pardoned 35 of them. Nine of the twelve defendants who were still on this list either had their charges dropped before they went to trial or were put on deferred adjudication, meaning that they were not found guilty in the end. Since the tenth defendant was underage when he committed the offense, the conviction was not recorded on his adult record. When the two remaining were apprehended in the Coleman sting, they were already on probation for a different offense; this probation was canceled, and they were sent to jail. The Coleman charges never resulted in their conviction.

=== Accused ===
The names of the defendants, their race, age at the time of arrest, and whether they were pardoned are shown below.

One through twenty-four
#	Name	Race	Age	Pardoned
1	Dennis Mitchell Allen	African American	34	Yes
2	James Ray Barrow	African American	31	Yes
3	Landis Barrow	African American	22	No (Note: Was on probation for previous offense; probation was revoked)
4	Leroy Barrow	African American	59	Yes
5	Mandis Charles Barrow	African American	22	No
6	Troy Benard	African American	29	Yes
7	Zury Bossett	African American	20	No (Note: Case was dismissed)
8	Fred Wesley Brookins Jr.	African American	24	Yes
9	Yul Eugene Bryant	African American	31	No
10	Eddie Cardona	Hispanic	41	No
11	Marilyn Joyce Cooper	African American	39	Yes
12	Armenu Jerrod Ervin	African American	19	Yes
13	Michael Fowler	African American	18	Yes
14	Jason Paul Fry	African American	25	Yes
15	Vickie Fry	African American	27	Yes
16	Willie B . Hall	African American	38	Yes
17	Cleveland Joe Henderson Jr.	African American	25	Yes
18	Mandrell L. Henry	African American	24	Yes
19	Christopher Eugene Jackson	African American	27	Yes
20	Denise Kelly	African American	29	Yes
21	Etta Kelly	African American	23	No (Note: Plead to three years deferred adjudication)
22	Eliga Kelly Sr.	African American	62	Yes
23	Calvin Kent Klein	White	22	Yes
24	Minor	White	16	No (Note: Sentenced to boot camp for juvenile offenders)

One through twenty-four
#	Name	Race	Age	Pardoned
25	William Cash Love	White	25	Yes
26	Joseph Corey Marshall	African American	23	Yes
27	Laura Ann Mata	Hispanic	23	Yes
28	Vincent Dwight McCray	African American	38	Yes
29	Joe Welton Moore	African American	58	Yes
30	James Moreno	Hispanic	?	No
31	Daniel G. Olivarez	Hispanic	20	Yes
32	Kenneth Ray Powell	African American	40	Yes
33	Benny Lee Robinson	African American	24	Yes
34	Finaye Shelton	African American	25	Yes
35	Donald Wayne Smith	African American	31	Yes
36	Lawanda Smith	African American	25	No
37	Yolanda Yvonne Smith	African American	25	Yes
38	Romona Lynn Strickland	African American	26	Yes
39	Timothy Wayne Towery	African American	27	Yes
40	Chandra Leah Van Cleave	White	22	No
41	Billy Don Wafer	African American	42	No
42	Kareem Abdul Jabbar White	African American	24	Yes
43	Kizzie R. White	African American	23	Yes
44	Tonya Michelle White	African American	30	No
45	Alberta Stell Williams	African American	49	Yes
46	Jason Jerome Williams	African American	19	Yes
47	Michelle Williams	African American	30	Yes

== Conviction of Tom Coleman ==
In 2003, the state appointed two prosecutors to hold evidentiary hearings to determine if Coleman's testimony was the sole basis for conviction, and to find out if county officials withheld information from the defense.

On Friday, January 14, 2005, Coleman was convicted of perjury in the separate evidentiary hearing trial, not related to the original 47 defendants that he testified against. During the five-day trial held in Lubbock, Texas, one of the three counts was dropped, leaving two alleged instances of perjury. He was acquitted on one count and found guilty on the second count. Coleman was sentenced to 10 years probation with a $7,500 fine. The 7th Court of Appeals of Texas in 2006 upheld the conviction.

Coleman could not be prosecuted for his testimony given during the trials of the drug defendants because the statute of limitations had expired.

== Drug Law Enforcement Evidentiary Standards Improvement Act of 2007 ==
In the aftermath of the Tulia drug sting, the Drug Law Enforcement Evidentiary Standards Improvement Act of 2007 was twice introduced in the United States Congress, but not passed. It aimed to increase the evidentiary standard required to convict a person for a drug offense and to require screening of law enforcement officers or others acting under color of law participating in drug task forces.

== Media ==
The story was widely covered by national media outlets such as 60 Minutes and The New York Times.

...Coleman's methods [of law-enforcement] were the subject of investigative reports in dozens of media outlets, from The New York Times, to Court TV, to The Independent of London...

— Blakeslee, Nate, Tulia: Race, Cocaine, and Corruption in a Small Texas Town, p. 5

The first newspaper article that was published about the arrests was by Michael Garrett of the Tulia Sentinel titled "Tulia's Streets Cleared of Garbage". It was three years before the story went national.

Starting in 2002, Bob Herbert, a journalist for The New York Times, wrote eleven op-ed articles that played a significant role in spreading the Tulia story across the United States. He wrote articles such as "Kafka in Tulia" which exposed the racism that occurred in the community, and "Tulia's Shattered Lives" which depicted how the arrest affected the lives of the incarcerated.

The book Tulia: Race, Cocaine, and Corruption in a Small Texas Town by Nate Blakeslee was to be adapted into a film directed by John Singleton starring Billy Bob Thornton. Halle Berry was cast to play a lawyer in the film. Berry was to play an attorney for the NAACP Legal Defense and Educational Fund. The movie was never completed.

== Notes and references ==
=== Sources ===
- "Racist arrests in Tulia, Texas". aclu.org. American Civil Liberties Union. June 30, 2003.
- Bean, Alan (2021). "In Memoriam: Gary O. Gardner".
- Blakeslee, Nate (2005). Tulia: Race, Cocaine, and Corruption in a Small Texas Town (1st ed.). New York: PublicAffairs. ISBN 978-1-58648-219-0 – via Google Books.
- Bradley, Ed (September 28, 2003). A lying undercover agent arrested 47 people, most of them black, on drug charges (Video). New York City: 60 Minutes – via YouTube.
- Brooks, Jack B. (September 13, 1994). "H.R.3355 – 103rd Congress (1993–1994): Violent Crime Control and Law Enforcement Act of 1994". congress.gov.
- Curtis, James (September 28, 2003). Miscarriage of Justice in Tulia Texas USA (Video). New York City: A&E Networks – via YouTube.
- Garrett, Michael (1999). "Tulia's Streets Cleared of Garbage". Tulia Sentinel.
- Hastings, Deborah (June 22, 2003). "Has Town Learned from the 1999 Miscarriage of Justice?". The Monitor. McAllen, Texas. pp. D1–D4 – via newspapers.com.
- Herbert, Bob (July 29, 2002a). "Tulia's Shattered Lives". The New York Times. New York City.
- Herbert, Bob (August 5, 2002b). "Kafka In Tulia". The New York Times. New York City.
- Hunt, Alex (May 4, 2022). "Tulia Drug Bust of 1999". tshaonline.org. Texas State Historical Association.
- Johnson, Kevin R. (2007). "Taking the 'Garbage' out in Tulia, Texas: The Taboo on Black-White Romance and Racial Profiling in the 'War on Drugs'". Wisconsin Law Review. 2007 (2): 283–318. ISSN 0043-650X.
- "Coleman Appeal Rejected". KFDA-TV. Amarillo, Texas. November 29, 2006.
- Kranish, Michael (June 8, 2020). "Joe Biden let police groups write his crime bill. Now, his agenda has changed". The Washington Post.
- Lee, Sheila Jackson (2007). "H.R. 253: No More Tulias: Drug Law Enforcement Evidentiary Standards Improvement Act of 2007".
- McNary, Dave (August 1, 2007). "John Singleton to direct 'Tulia'". Variety. Los Angeles.
- Mosle, Sara (November 6, 2005). "Tulia: Race, Cocaine, and Corruption in a Small Texas Town". The New York Times.
- Musik Nussbaum, Melissa (August 7, 2017). "Tulia, Texas, is a complicated place of pain, redemption". National Catholic Reporter. Kansas City, Missouri.
- "Texas undercover cop convicted of perjury". New York City: NBC News. Associated Press. January 14, 2005.
- "1994 Violent Crime Control and Law Enforcement Act". ojp.gov. Office of Justice Programs, United States Department of Justice. February 14, 2020.
- Balko, Radley (June 2021). The Rise of the Warrior Cop: The Militarization of America's Police Forces. New York City: PublicAffairs. ISBN 978-1-61039-212-9 – via Archive.org.
