= Richard Beck (author) =

American journalist and author

- Occupation: Author

Richard Beck is an American journalist and author. His books include We Believe the Children (2015), and Homeland (2024). His work has also appeared in The Harvard Crimson, the London Review of Books, the New Left Review, Time, and n+1.

He graduated from Harvard College in 2009.

== Works ==
- We Believe The Children: A Moral Panic in the 1980s. PublicAffairs. 2015. ISBN 978-1-61039-287-7.
- Homeland: The War on Terror in American Life. Crown. 2024. ISBN 978-0-593-24022-9.
