= Four Fish =

2010 book by Paul Greenberg

- Author: Paul Greenberg
- Language: English
- Publisher: Penguin Books

Four Fish: The Future of the Last Wild Food is a 2010 nonfiction book by author Paul Greenberg. This work explores the state of commercial fishing and aquaculture. Greenberg frames his observations by commenting on the status of four specific fish: cod, salmon, bass, and tuna. Choosing four fish was a decision influenced by author Michael Pollan's selection of four plants in his book, The Botany of Desire.

The New York Times gave the book a positive review. David Helvarg gave the book a positive review on sfgate.com. The book was reviewed by The Los Angeles Times.

== Publication data ==
- Paul Greenberg Four Fish (2010) Penguin Books, hardcover: ISBN 1-594-20256-7, 2011 paperback: ISBN 978-0-14-311946-3
