= Paul Greenberg (author) =

American fisherman and author

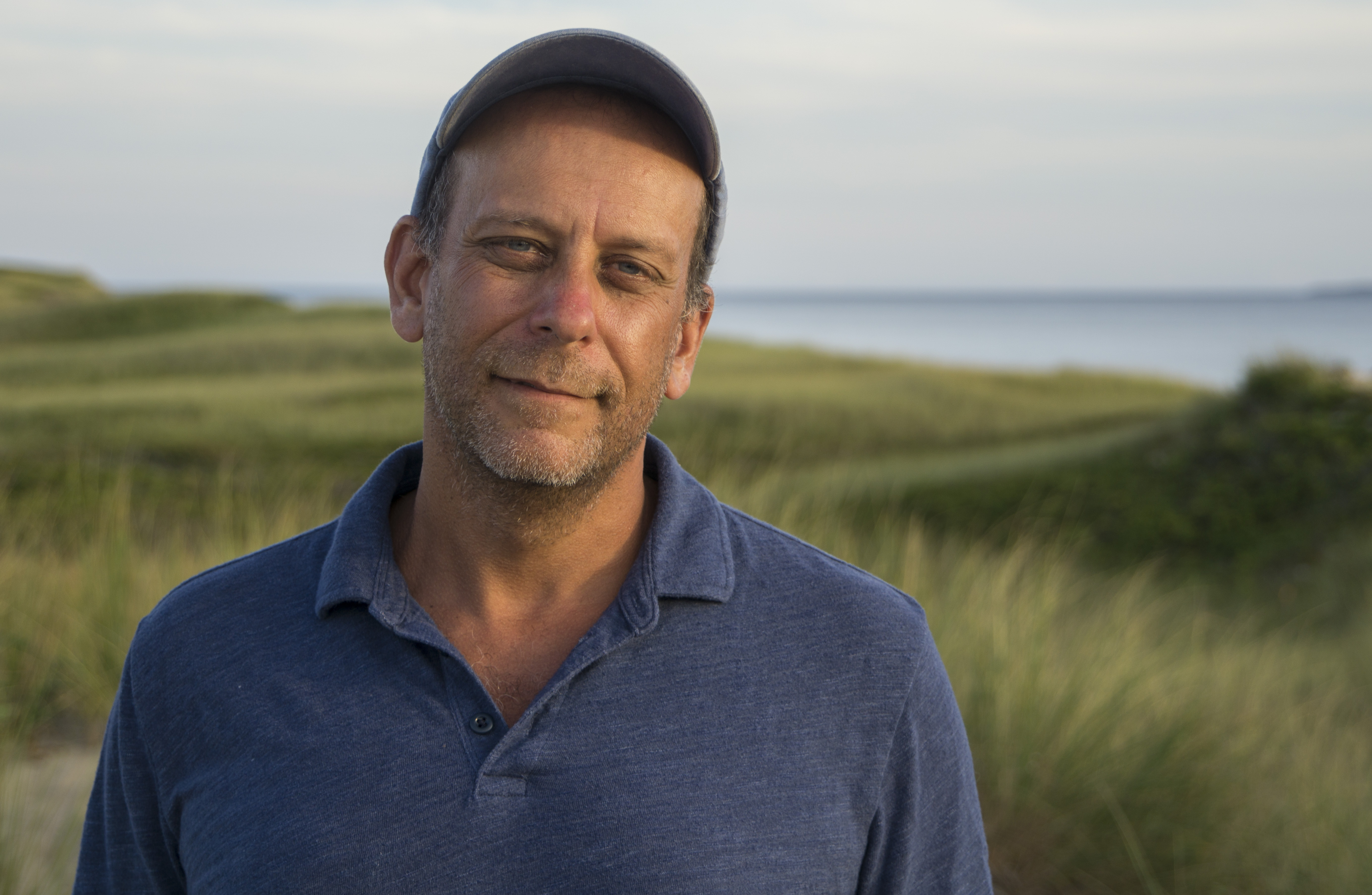
- Paul Greenberg
- Born: July 4, 1967 (age 59); New York City
- Occupations: Author, journalist
- Website: http://www.paulgreenberg.org

Paul Greenberg (born July 4, 1967) is an American fisherman and author who focuses on environmental, seafood and technology issues.

== Biography ==
Greenberg has been a lifelong fisherman and started fishing with his father when he was five years old. He studied Russian Studies at Brown University.

His book, Four Fish: The Future of the Last Wild Food, was published in 2010 by Penguin Press on July 15, and entered the New York Times Best Selling Hardcover List as of August 13. In addition to its commercial success the book received wide critical acclaim, most notably on the cover of the New York Times Book Review by the Times' food editor Sam Sifton who called it "a necessary book for anyone truly interested in what we take from the sea to eat." The book won the 2011 James Beard Award for writing and literature. Many of the themes in Four Fish were later explored in a 2017 Frontline PBS documentary Greenberg anchored and co-wrote called The Fish On My Plate. Greenberg's 2015 TED Talk has received over 1.5 million views.

In 2014 Greenberg followed up Four Fish with American Catch: The Fight for Our Local Seafood, a book that examined the odd fact that while the US controls more ocean than any country on earth it imports more than 91% of its seafood from other countries. In 2018 Penguin Press published the third in his "marine trilogy" The Omega Principle: Seafood and the Quest for a Longer Life and a Healthier Planet an in-depth look at omega-3 fatty acids and the unique role they play in human health and environmental balance. In 2020 and 2021 Greenberg published Goodbye Phone, Hello World (Chronicle Books) and The Climate Diet (Penguin Press). The Climate Diet focuses on 50 ways people can reduce their carbon footprint.

Most recently Greenberg published A Third Term, a speculative fiction in which George Washington is summoned from the past to run against a Trump-like "Tyrant" in 2028.

Greenberg has been a National Endowment for the Arts Literature Fellow, a Pew Fellow in Marine Conservation, and a W.K. Kellogg Foundation Food and Society Policy Fellow. He currently resides in New York City and lectures widely throughout North America.

== Diet ==
In September 2015 in response to having his blood drawn, Greenberg decided to become a pescetarian. Greenberg spent a year eating only fish.

== Selected publications ==
- Four Fish (2010)
- American Catch (2014)
- The Omega Principle (2018)
- Goodbye Phone, Hello World (2020)
- The Climate Diet (2021)
- A Third Term (2024)
