= Susan Southard =

American non-fiction writer

- Education: Antioch University, Los Angeles
- Writing career
- Genre: non-fiction
- Notable awards: J. Anthony Lukas Book Prize, Dayton Literary Peace Prize
- Website: www.susansouthard.com

Susan Southard is an American non-fiction writer. She won the 2016 J. Anthony Lukas Book Prize and the Dayton Literary Peace Prize, for her book Nagasaki: Life After Nuclear War. Southard graduated from Antioch University, Los Angeles, with an MFA in creative writing. She has written for The New York Times, the Los Angeles Times, Politico, and Lapham’s Quarterly.

== Works ==
- Nagasaki: Life After Nuclear War, New York, New York : Penguin Books, 2016. ISBN 9780143109426, OCLC 928480100
