= Michelle Nijhuis =

American science journalist

Michelle Nijhuis (born January 7, 1974) is an American science journalist who writes about conservation and climate change for many publications, including National Geographic and Smithsonian magazines.

== Early life and education ==
Nijhuis was born and raised in Poughkeepsie, New York. She graduated from Reed College in 1996 and began interning at High Country News, in Paonia, Colorado, in January 1998.

== Career ==
Nijhuis is the Contributing Editor of High Country News. She also holds the title of Contributing Writer for Smithsonian magazine. She has also published in The New York Times, Nature, Scientific American, National Geographic, Audubon, and Orion, among many other outlets. She gave the 2008 commencement address at her alma mater, Reed College.

With journalist Thomas Hayden, Nijhuis is the co-editor of The Science Writers’ Handbook, released in spring 2013. Nijhuis blogs regularly at The Last Word on Nothing. In her book, Beloved Beasts, published in 2021, she traces key turning points in the development of conservation biology that considers the restoration of ecological processes with an emphasis on the impact of an animal upon the ecosystem beyond the importance of an individual species. Beginning with the conservation of American bison, the book describes chronologically both well known campaigns and obscure efforts to protect animals along with key people and organizations. Turning points in the history of the conservation movement are told through the biographies of interesting, often flawed and contradictory people. She doesn't avoid the realities of where conservation was built on a foundation of nationalism, sexism, and racism. The movement, with roots in elite circles in North America and Europe, often overlooked the ability of people to manage the species they live alongside.

Nijhuis appeared in the 2023 Ken Burns documentary The American Buffalo.

== Awards ==
Nijhuis has received several awards for her work, including the 2012 American Association for the Advancement of Science's Kavli Science Journalism Award in the magazine category, for her piece titled Crisis in the Caves on white-nose syndrome in bats. The piece was published by Smithsonian and was also the recipient of the 2012 Award for Reporting on a Significant Topic, from the American Society of Journalists and Authors.

In 2011, Nijhuis was a fellow of the Alicia Patterson Foundation.

Nijhuis received the 2006 Walter Sullivan Award for Excellence in Science Journalism from the American Geophysical Union; a 2006 AAAS Science Journalism Award in the small newspaper category; the Media Award from the American Institute of Biological Sciences; and three additional awards from the American Society of Journalists and Authors. Nijhuis has been a finalist for the National Academies Communication Award.

== Bibliography ==
- The Science Writers' Handbook: Everything You Need to Know to Pitch, Publish, and Prosper in the Digital Age (Hachette Books, 2013), ed. with Thomas Hayden ISBN 9780738216560
- The Science Writers' Essay Handbook: How to Craft Compelling True Stories in Any Medium (2016) ISBN 9780692654668
- Beloved Beasts: Fighting for Life in the Age of Extinction (W.W. Norton & Company, Inc, 2021), ISBN 9781324001690)
