= The Ground Breaking =

2021 book by Scott Ellsworth

The Ground Breaking: An American City and Its Search for Justice
- Author: Scott Ellsworth
- Language: English
- Subject: Tulsa race massacre
- Publisher: Dutton
- Publication date: May 18, 2021
- Pages: 336
- ISBN: 978-0-593-18298-7

The Ground Breaking: An American City and Its Search for Justice is a 2021 book by Scott Ellsworth that examines the 1921 Tulsa race massacre. The book was longlisted for the 2022 Andrew Carnegie Medal for Excellence in Nonfiction.
