= Renaud Piarroux =

French doctor and scientist

- Born: September 27, 1960 (age 66)
- Education: Pediatric Residency, 1990 Infectious Disease Residency, 1993 PhD Microbiology & Cellular Biology, University of Aix-Marseille, 1995

Renaud Piarroux (born 27 September 1960) is a French pediatrician specializing in infectious diseases and tropical medicine. From 2008 to 2017, he has been a full professor of parasitology and mycology at the University of Aix-Marseille in Marseille, France, and head of parasitology and mycology at Assistance Publique-Hôpitaux de Marseille. Since 2017, he has been a full professor of parasitology and mycology at the Sorbonne University in Paris, France, and Head of Parasitology and Mycology at Assistance Publique – Hôpitaux de Paris. Over the years, Piarroux has taken part in several missions and research projects in Africa, including the study of the dynamics of cholera epidemics in Comoros, Democratic Republic of Congo and Guinea, prevention and management of parasitic diseases in Morocco, and a program to fight against waterborne diseases in Ivory Coast.

Piarroux has been the Regional Representative of the Franche-Comté region of France and responsible for various missions with Médecins du Monde (MDM) (Doctors of the World) in Grand Comoros and the Democratic Republic of Congo. He also worked on the analysis of risks of epidemics and assessing health priorities after natural disasters and conflicts including:

- Zaire (later Democratic Republic of Congo), 1994 and on-going since 2002
- Herat, Afghanistan, 1995
- Honduras, 1998
- Haiti, (see below)

In these risk analyses he studied how cholera spreads through regions and communities.

In November 2010 he was called in by the Haitian government and French Embassy to investigate the origin and course of the world's largest cholera epidemic of recent times, and to assist authorities in creating an effective control program. These activities were highlighted in the book Deadly River(Cornell University Press, 2016), authored by Ralph R. Frerichs. Piarroux related the end of the story and related scientific controversies in the book Choléra. Haïti 2010-2018 : histoire d'un désastre [Cholera. Haiti 2010-2018, a disasters' story]. (CNRS editions, 2019).

Piarroux is an ongoing member of the travel-related and imported diseases committee of the French Ministry of Health. He is a founding member of the Global Alliance Against Cholera (GAAC), started in the eastern part of DR Congo, that has since expanded to other cholera-affected countries. He has been awarded the French Legion of Honour in 2017.

== Life and career ==
Renaud Piarroux was born in Cherbourg, France, the son of painter Jean Piarroux and medical pathologist Marie-Claude Deleval.

Following graduation, he became assistant professor of parasitology at Besançon University Hospital, where he created the parasitology-mycology department and became a full professor in 2001. He was director of Santé et Environnement Rural Franche-Comté, and the EA2276 research team at Franche-Comté University from 2004 to 2007.

In Besançon, his academic publication subjects included: Farmer's lung, the relationship between mold and asthma, unhealthy dwellings, cholera, echinococcosis (a local parasitic disease). Following a move in 2008 to Marseille, his work focused on three subjects:

- Creating and evaluating diagnosis tools in parasitology and mycology and their consequences on patient management (especially microsatellites, and MALDI-TOF analysis)
- Epidemiology of parasitic and tropical diseases, (especially leishmaniasis, cholera and malaria, with special interest in characterizing how molecular or genetic specificities evolve in time and space)
- Environmental moist exposure and health consequences (especially mold and unhealthy dwellings, moist and reanimation departments)

His interest in cholera epidemics started in 1994 while working as a volunteer pediatrician in Goma, Zaire during an extensive cholera outbreak following the Rwandan genocide. He next encountered cholera while working with MDM in Grand Comorro in 1998. There, he created a surveillance system that with rapid follow-up and simple interventions eventually brought the outbreak under control.

Piarroux next helped in defining cholera control priorities in eastern Democratic Republic of Congo, with the help of a local epidemiologist, who became his student, Dr. Didier Bompangue. They observed that cholera regularly came back from the lake area in eastern Democratic Republic of Congo. Enlarging his study in time and space, and using genetic analysis he concluded that only a few towns play the role of amplifier, and that cholera was linked to human mobility.

In 2010 Piarroux was asked by the French government to investigate the Haiti cholera epidemic; questions arose in the scientific community as Haiti had never been hit by cholera before. His investigation led to the controversial conclusion that the epidemic was imported by United Nations soldiers in a Nepalese UN peacekeeping camp near Mirebalais in the center of Haiti. His findings ran counter to the more popular Haitian environmental cholera paradigm. Pr Rita Colwell, the main proponent of the environmental theory, postulated it was a "perfect storm" of three converging factors, an earthquake followed by a hot summer and then a Hurricane that triggered the explosive epidemic. Piarroux agreed that some vibrios are living in coastal waters, but argued that in Haiti (as in Democratic Republic of Congo), cholera didn't come ex nihilo from coastal water, and further that the storm came after the epidemics had started. Other scientists demonstrated that the cholera in Haiti originated from Nepal. Human mobility was thus key to disease transmission in Haiti. This was important information for formulating an effective elimination strategy. Details of the political and scientific controversies are presented in Deadly River by Ralph R. Frerichs (Cornell University Press, 2016). Following the publication of a long time United Nations Special Rapporteur, Philip Alston, the Secretary-General of the United Nations Ban Ki-moon acknowledged the role of United Nations soldiers in the beginning of the Haitian cholera epidemics. He presently defends a new approach based on an "intense effort to treat and prevent the disease, as well as a concerted effort to deliver material assistance to those most directly affected."

In 2020, he was actively working for the APHP COVID response team, especially in developing COVISAN, a project aiming at helping COVID positive person to better isolate themselves. He describe this fight in La Vague, l'épidémie vue du terrain(CNRS Editions, 2020).

Piarroux has three adult children. He resides in Paris.

== Books ==
- Cholera, Haiti: 2010-2018, Histoire d'un désastre (2019)
- La Vague, l'épidémie vue du terrain (2020)
- Sapiens et les microbes. Les épidémies d’autrefois. Des origines à 1918 (2025)
- Sapiens et les microbes. Les épidémies contemporaines. (2026)

== Articles ==
- Bompangue, D; Giraudoux, P; Handschumacher, P; Piarroux, M; Sudre, B; Ekwanzala, M; Kebela, I; Piarroux, R (2008). "Lakes as source of cholera outbreaks, Democratic Republic of Congo". Emerging Infect. Dis. 14 (5): 798–800. doi:10.3201/eid1405.071260. PMC 2600234. PMID 18439365.
- Frerichs, RR; Boncy, J; Barrais, R; Keim, PS; Piarroux, R (2012). "Source attribution of 2010 cholera epidemic in Haiti". Proc. Natl. Acad. Sci. U.S.A. 109 (47): E3208, author reply E3209. Bibcode:2012PNAS..109E3208F. doi:10.1073/pnas.1211512109. PMC 3511120. PMID 23047703.
- Bengtsson, L; Gaudart, J; Lu, X; Moore, S; Wetter, E; Sallah, K; Rebaudet, S; Piarroux, R (2015). "Using mobile phone data to predict the spatial spread of cholera". Sci Rep. 5: 8923. Bibcode:2015NatSR...5E8923B. doi:10.1038/srep08923. PMC 4352843. PMID 25747871.
- Cassagne, C; Normand, AC; Bonzon, L; L'Ollivier, C; Gautier, M; Jeddi, F; Ranque, S; Piarroux, R (2016). "Routine identification and mixed species detection in 6,192 clinical yeast isolates". Med. Mycol. 54 (3): 256–65. doi:10.1093/mmy/myv095. PMID 26613703.
- Normand, AC; Ranque, S; Cassagne, C; Gaudart, J; Sallah, K; Charpin, DA; Piarroux, R (2016). "Comparison of Air Impaction and Electrostatic Dust Collector Sampling Methods to Assess Airborne Fungal Contamination in Public Buildings" (PDF). Ann Occup Hyg. 60 (2): 161–75. doi:10.1093/annhyg/mev075. PMID 26491105.
- Moore, S; Miwanda, B; Sadji, AY; Thefenne, H; Jeddi, F; Rebaudet, S; de Boeck, H; Bidjada, B; Depina, JJ; Bompangue, D; Abedi, AA; Koivogui, L; Keita, S; Garnotel, E; Plisnier, PD; Ruimy, R; Thomson, N; Muyembe, JJ; Piarroux, R (2015). "Relationship between Distinct African Cholera Epidemics Revealed via MLVA Haplotyping of 337 Vibrio cholerae Isolates". PLOS Negl Trop Dis. 9 (6) e0003817. doi:10.1371/journal.pntd.0003817. PMC 4482140. PMID 26110870.
- Bompangue Nkoko, D; Giraudoux, P; Plisnier, PD; Tinda, AM; Piarroux, M; Sudre, B; Horion, S; Tamfum, JJ; Ilunga, BK; Piarroux, R (2011). "Dynamics of cholera outbreaks in Great Lakes region of Africa, 1978-2008". Emerging Infect. Dis. 17 (11): 2026–34. doi:10.3201/eid1711.110170. PMC 3310557. PMID 22099090.
