= Eyal Press =

American author and journalist

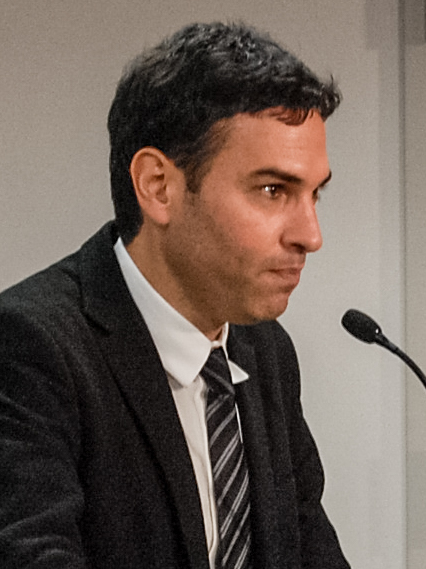
- Press in 2010
- Born: 1970 (age 55–56); Jerusalem
- Education: Brown University; New York University

Eyal Press (born 1970) is an American author and journalist based in New York City. He is the author of three books and is a contributor to The New Yorker and The New York Times, among other publications. Much of Press' writing and journalism focuses on topics of morality and social and economic inequality.

== Early life and education ==
Eyal Press was born in Jerusalem in 1970. His father, Shalom, was a gynecologist and abortion provider born to a Russian Jewish family that had immigrated to Mandatory Palestine. His mother, Carla, was born in the Nazis' Yampol concentration camp ghetto during the Holocaust (located in Moldova/Transnistria).

In 1973, the family emigrated from Israel to Buffalo, New York for Shalom's obstetrics and gynecology residency. Eyal Press was raised in Buffalo.

Press received a Bachelor of Arts in history from Brown University in 1992. He later earned a Ph.D. from New York University.

== Works ==
=== Books ===
- Absolute Convictions: My Father, a City, and the Conflict that Divided America, Macmillan, 2006, ISBN 978-0-312-42657-6
- Beautiful Souls: The Courage and Conscience of Ordinary People in Extraordinary Times, Farrar, Straus & Giroux, 2012, ISBN 978-0-8050-7731-5
- Dirty Work: Essential Jobs and the Hidden Toll of Inequality in America, Farrar, Straus & Giroux, 2021, ISBN 978-0-374-71443-7

=== Articles ===
- "In Front of Their Faces: Does facial-recognition technology lead police to ignore contradictory evidence?", The New Yorker, 20 November 2023, pp. 20–26.
- “Should I Stay or Should I Go?: The quandary faced by government lawyers who think that the Trump Administration is subverting justice", The New Yorker, 5 October 2026, pp. 26-35.
