= Jonathan M. Katz =

American journalist and author (born 1980)

Jonathan Myerson Katz (born 1980) is an American journalist and author known for his reporting on the 2010 Haiti earthquake and the role of the United Nations in the ensuing cholera outbreak.

== Background and education ==
Katz was born in Queens, New York to a Jewish family and grew up in Louisville, Kentucky. His aunt by marriage was the writer Rachel Pollack.

He graduated from Northwestern University with a Bachelor of Arts in History and American Studies in 2002, and with a master's degree in journalism from the Medill School of Journalism in 2004. During his undergraduate years, he was a reporter, editor, and cartoonist for The Daily Northwestern.

== Career ==
=== Early career and Associated Press ===
Katz began working as a reporter while in graduate school at Medill; his assignments included covering the Pentagon for Lee Enterprises at the start of the Iraq War. He reported for the Associated Press as an intern while stationed in Jerusalem during the Second Intifada in fall 2003. In 2004, Katz worked at Congressional Quarterly as a committees reporter. The following year, he joined the AP's Washington Bureau, where he reported that Senate Majority Leader Bill Frist (then the frontrunner for the Republican presidential nomination) had sold all his stock in his family's hospital corporation immediately before the price dropped. Katz moved to the Dominican Republic to be AP correspondent in 2006, and then to Port-au-Prince, Haiti in October 2007. His major stories for the AP during this time included articles on the 2008 food crisis and riots, the 2008 Pétion-Ville school collapse, election fraud, as well as hurricanes and tropical storms ravaging the country.

=== 2010 Haiti earthquake, aftermath, and cholera ===
Katz was the only full-time American correspondent in Haiti when the 2010 Haiti earthquake struck on January 12, 2010. Katz, then 29, was on the second floor of his rented house in the Pétion-Ville neighborhood when the swaying started at approximately 4:45 p.m. He rushed outside barefoot as his house collapsed, borrowed a cell phone on the street, and became the first to report the earthquake; the alert he sent out hit the newswire at the same time as the U.S. Geological Survey's initial report of the quake. In an unusual move for a wire service, the AP ran Katz's first-person account of surviving the quake the next day. In the months after the earthquake, Katz stayed in Haiti to report on the country's recovery and issues with the delivery of foreign aid, specifically from the U.S.

That fall, he reported that UN peacekeepers were the likely cause of a post-quake cholera epidemic that had led to the deaths of at least 6,600 people. For three months, the UN refused to allow an independent investigation. Among the pressures cited by observers as leading to the UN's reversal was Katz's reporting, which (according to medical journalist R. Jan Gurley) "spread almost instantly around the world, irrevocably reframing a massive health crisis and probably changing international policies for years to come". After Katz obtained an internal report condemning the Secretariat for its lack of accountability, the UN admitted having played a role in the outbreak in 2016.

Katz won the 2010 Medill Medal for Courage in Journalism for his reporting on the earthquake and its aftermath. He also received a National Headliners Award, and was a finalist for the Livingston Award and Michael Kelly Award for the "fearless pursuit and expression of truth".

== Later career ==
Katz reported in Mexico during the drug wars. He was an AP editor until leaving the organization in 2012 to write The Big Truck that Went By (published in 2013).

He has become a regular contributor to The New York Times, where he has covered topics such as U.S. police violence and the 2015 murders of Muslim students in Chapel Hill, North Carolina. Katz's work has also appeared in The New Republic, The Guardian, Foreign Policy, Politico, and The New Yorker website, with a grant from the Pulitzer Center on Crisis Reporting, as well as The New York Times Magazine.

In March 2024, U.S. Senator Katie Britt gave the Republican response to President Joe Biden's State of the Union Address. Katz accused her of misrepresenting the story shared in her response, which Britt had shared on more than one occasion previously, about sex trafficking victim Karla Jacinto Romero. According to research Katz conducted, despite Britt's suggestion that Romero was victimized in the United States under Biden's administration, the events surrounding Romero occurred in Mexico; they also occurred under George W. Bush's administration (between 2004 and 2008), before Biden was even Vice President.

== The Racket ==
Katz began publishing a newsletter entitled The Racket. Subscriptions, both free and paid, are necessary to read the newsletter. It asserts that it is dedicated to examining "[t]he unseen connections behind international affairs, disaster, politics, and more".

Its September 7, 2022 edition, edited by Tommy Craggs, is entitled, You can't fight fascism without a little partisanship. It addresses what Katz determined to be faulty criticism of the speech that President Joe Biden delivered in Philadelphia on September 1 regarding the "battle for the soul of the nation"; Katz responded directly to several critics who labeled the speech as "partisan".

In 2023, Katz reported dialogue with Substack regarding its new promotion of extremist newsletters, hosted on its platform, to subscribers of other newsletters also hosted on the platform. His issue with Substack and its billing partner, Stripe, was their profiteering from the uninvited promotion of solicitations. Coupled with this was the address sharing they complied to on behalf of extremist authors, an issue that had given rise to a letter to the platform entitled Substackers Against Nazis; it has been signed in objection by other publications and writers on the platform. In his December 23, 2023 edition of his newsletter, entitled The Social Network, Katz provides details and options he is exploring in reaction to assertion by the platform that the policy will continue.

== Books ==
The Big Truck That Went By was shortlisted for the PEN/John Kenneth Galbraith Award for Non-Fiction. It won the 2013 Cornelius Ryan Award for "the best nonfiction book on international affairs", given by the Overseas Press Club of America. Katz received the J. Anthony Lukas Work-in Progress Award, given to support the completion of "significant works of nonfiction", and the resulting book was a finalist for the J. Anthony Lukas Book Prize, awarded by the Columbia School of Journalism and Harvard's Nieman Foundation to significant works of nonfiction. Katz's first book also won the 2013 WOLA-Duke Human Rights Book Award, given annually by the Washington Office on Latin America and Duke University to honor nonfiction books focusing on human rights, democracy, and social justice in contemporary Latin America.

His second book, Gangsters of Capitalism: Smedley Butler, the Marines, and the Making and Breaking of America's Empire, was published in January 2022. It traces the life of Major General Smedley Butler, including his role in foiling the Business Plot to overthrow President Franklin D. Roosevelt, and the long-term consequences of the wars in which Butler fought; to document how he is remembered in the locations of those wars, Katz interviewed Haitian workers and Chinese martial artists and played a bit part in a film in the Philippines.

== Awards ==
=== For The Big Truck That Went By ===
- Shortlisted for the PEN/John Kenneth Galbraith Award for Non-Fiction
- Barnes & Noble "Discover Great New Writers" Selection
- 2012 J. Anthony Lukas Work-in-Progress Award "to aid the completion of a significant work of nonfiction" from Columbia Graduate School of Journalism and Nieman Foundation for Journalism at Harvard and finalist for 2014 J. Anthony Lukas Book Prize
- 2013 WOLA-Duke Human Rights Book Award for his contribution to the public's understanding of human rights, democracy, and social justice in contemporary Latin America.
- 2013 Overseas Press Club of America Cornelius Ryan Award for the "best nonfiction book on international affairs".

=== For reporting ===
- 2010 Medill Medal for Courage in Journalism
- Finalist for 2011 Michael Kelly Award
- 2011 National Headliner Award, 1st Place News Beat Coverage
- 2011 and 2009 SPJ Deadline Club of New York Awards
- Finalist for Livingston Award for International Reporting by journalists under 35 in 2009 and 2014
