= Janesville: An American Story =

Non fiction novel

- First edition
- Author: Amy Goldstein
- Language: English
- Subject: History
- Publisher: Simon & Schuster
- Publication date: April 18, 2017
- Publication place: United States
- Media type: Print (Hardcover)
- Pages: 368
- Awards: Financial Times and McKinsey Business Book of the Year Award (2017); J. Anthony Lukas Book Prize (2018)
- ISBN: 1-501-10223-0
- Dewey Decimal: 330.9775

Janesville: An American Story is a non-fiction book written by Amy Goldstein and published by Simon & Schuster in 2017. It covers the city of Janesville, Wisconsin, and follows the stories of several of its working-class inhabitants from 2008 to 2013, tracing what happens after the Janesville Assembly Plant shuts down.

== Reception ==
It was named as a book of the year by The Economist, one of 100 notable books of 2017 by The New York Times, and one of 50 notable works of nonfiction in 2017 by The Washington Post. Former President Barack Obama also named it one of the best books he read in 2017.

It won the 2018 J. Anthony Lukas Book Prize and the 2017 Financial Times and McKinsey Business Book of the Year Award. The J. Anthony Lukas Book Prize, in its award description, called it "a triumph of narrative nonfiction" which "marshalls shoe-leather reporting and original social science into a panoramic portrait of workers, politicians, parents, teenagers, educators, business leaders, and a community struggling to find a way forward."

Patti Waldmeir in The Financial Times states that Janesville "humanises the suffering of the white working class in America at a time when the country critically needs to understand the angst that helped elect the president." Jennifer Senior of The New York Times called it "moving and magnificently well-researched."

Michael Barone, writing in The Wall Street Journal, points out a pro-union bias in the book, but admits that it is "generally fair-minded".

It also received favorable coverage from Joshua Rothman in The New Yorker and Arlie Hochschild in The Washington Post.

Janesville has been mentioned alongside Arlie Hochschild's Strangers in Their Own Land, JD Vance's Hillbilly Elegy, and Joan C. Williams's White Working Class as part of "a growing family of books about the evisceration of the working class in the United States" but which is set apart by "the sophistication of its storytelling and analysis."
