= Alejandro Cravioto =

Alejandro Cravioto (born 1947) is professor of microbiology and public health in the Faculty of Medicine of the National Autonomous University of Mexico.

He was born in Mexico, the son of physician and nutritional scientist Joaquin Cravioto and Cristina O'Farrill.

Cravioto received his MD degree in 1973 from Universidad Nacional Autónoma de México. He completed a Residency in Pediatrics at the National Institute of Pediatrics, Mexico City, 1973-1976. He also received a Diploma in Tropical Public Health with distinction in 1977 from the London School of Hygiene & Tropical Medicine. In 1981, Cravioto earned a PhD degree from the University of London.

He is a noted expert on child health and diarrheal diseases.

He has had more than 200 papers published in international journals and has authored two textbooks.
