= Brave New Films =

Non-profit organisation in the USA

Brave New Films logo

Brave New Films (BNF) is a nonprofit film company based in Culver City, California. Founded by filmmaker Robert Greenwald, BNF produces feature-length documentaries and investigative videos that seek "to educate, influence and empower viewers to take action around issues that matter."

== History ==
In 2001, Robert Greenwald was a respected film producer and director with nearly three decades of socially conscious television and theatrical credits. After 11 September, he decided to turn his efforts to documentary filmmaking. He teamed up with Richard Ray Perez and Joan Sekler to create his first nonfiction film, Unprecedented: The 2000 Presidential Election (2002), about the controversial poll results from Florida.

Unprecedented was shown in theaters around the country, on cable TV, and made the round of film festivals, bringing home 11 awards. But Greenwald saw opportunities for higher viewership with experimental marketing models. He teamed with former dot-com exec Jim Gilliam to create a distribution model for his next short documentary – Uncovered: The War on Iraq (2004). Uncovered, about the government and media push for the invasion of Iraq in 2003, was distributed through the websites of influential partner organizations such as MoveOn.org, the Nation and the Center for American Progress. The multi-organizational partnership model would become a keystone of Greenwald’s filmmaking approach.

The new strategy was successful beyond Greenwald’s expectations. The first two days Unprecedented was available, more than 23,000 people requested copies. MoveOn sponsored thousands of "house parties" across the country where people could gather and watch the film. Greenwald made sure that every US Senator and Congressperson was invited to a screening.

Going forward, he and Gilliam tried new approaches to traditional production models as well. Outfoxed: Rupert Murdoch’s War on Journalism (2004) took on Fox News, claiming that they have a pervasive Republican bias. Outfoxed used extensive clips from Fox News under the doctrine of fair use, which allows limited use of copyrighted material for parody or criticism. Turning standard documentary wisdom on its head, Greenwald also used his future audience as active members of his production team by inviting them to work as production researchers.

After Outfoxed "put Greenwald on the mainstream documentary map," he officially registered Brave New Films as a 501(c)4 charity. The new nonprofit went on to produce Walmart: The High Cost of Low Price (2005), using BNF’s freshly minted distribution model. In keeping with a developing philosophy of including the audience as active participants in the process, BNF invited 1500 volunteers across the country to shoot footage of their local Walmarts for the film. They also tried a new model for funding their documentary films. An email request for donations to make the movie drew $267,892 in 2 days, in 2004 – 2 years before the word crowdfunding was coined and 5 years before Kickstarter launched.

BNF continued to explore new options for distribution with Iraq for Sale: The War Profiteers (2006). In order to facilitate arranging the house party screenings that had become a hallmark of BNF, Gilliam invented Brave New Theatres, described as a mashup between "My-Space, and Evite and Moviefone."

BNF was growing and changing in parallel with the social media explosion on the Internet. New sites like YouTube, Facebook and Hulu had profound impact on their evolving production and distribution models. BNF started a YouTube channel which they populated with hundreds of short viral videos about a variety of progressive issues, including criticism of Fox News; military policy on LGBT servicemen and women; Power Without Petroleum; and much more. At the same time, BNF was developing their multimedia approach to include blogs, websites, petitions, Facebook pages and Twitter accounts with millions of followers.

In 2008, BNF took on presidential candidate John McCain with The Real McCain series of short videos. McCain found himself forced to respond to embarrassing questions about how many homes he owned – a serious issue amidst a historic housing crisis – as well as his spiritual leaders and his health, among other topics. The New York Times wrote, "Mr. Greenwald shows how technology has dispersed the power to shape campaign narratives, potentially upending the way American presidential campaigns are fought."

Greenwald and BNF returned to long-form documentary with Rethink Afghanistan (2009). However, there was a twist: in order to address a fast-changing topic in a timely way, the film was released in six on-line segments, in "real time" over 2008 and 2009.

In 2010, BNF launched one of its most successful multimedia campaigns, Cuentame, which addresses Latino issues, worker rights and immigration reform. BNF continued its immigration reform campaign with the 2018 release of Immigrant Prisons. Beyond Bars (2023) is another touchstone campaign, that works on the issue of mass incarceration in the US. The Koch Brothers Exposed (2012) film and campaign built awareness of the right-wing billionaires’ influence on US government and industry. Under the umbrella of another campaign, War Costs, BNF produced two full-length films, War on Whistleblowers (2013) and Unmanned: America's Drone Wars (2013). For Unmanned, BNF brought drone strike survivors to Washington, and for the first time, congresspeople heard eyewitness testimony from civilians on the ground in Pakistan.

Ahead of the 2020 election, BNF took up the issue of voter suppression in the first film of the Suppressed series, Suppressed: The Fight to Vote (2019). Suppressed received a 2020 Social Justice Film Festival award, a 2019 Teaneck International Film Festival award, and a 2019 American Insight's Free Speech Award. BNF subsequently released three more Suppressed films, Suppressed: The Fight to Vote (2020), Suppressed and Sabotaged: The Fight to Vote (2022) and Suppressed and Sabotaged: The Fight to Vote (2024).

Following the E. Jean Carroll v. Donald Trump trial, BNF released a documentary short titled after the case. The short starred actresses Kathryn Hahn, Lexi Underwood, Regina Taylor, and Ellen Burstyn and featured excerpts from Carroll's testimony. In 2025, BNF released Gaza: Journalists Under Fire (2025) which details the lives of three Palestinian journalists who were killed while covering the war in Gaza.

== Impact ==
Brave New Films is notable for both its innovations in documentary production and distribution models; and for the practical impact of its films and campaigns. Its first films "demonstrated to the rest of us [documentary filmmakers] that there was a new way of marketing a documentary." "By employing distribution strategies based on the Internet and the Internet’s ability to support ‘user generated content,’ to bring his films to mass audiences, Greenwald became arguably, the most influential political documentary maker working in the U.S. and a political entrepreneur with national reach."

The full-length documentaries, short subjects and viral videos produced by Brave New Films have been seen tens of millions of times, across the globe, "which in many cases, amped up debate, raised consciousness, and produced some of the change we have been waiting for." Its work has been covered by mainstream media including The New York Times, The Chicago Tribune, The Washington Post, CNN, MSNBC, Time magazine, and The Huffington Post, among others, with a worldwide media reach of billions.

Brave New Films’ work "challenge(s) the political discourses of some of the most powerful figures and institutions in U.S. society, including a sitting president and his administration." Examples of such impact include: The Walmart film forced the largest company in the world to curtail its expansionism. Iraq for Sale and Unmanned both triggered congressional hearings, and have been influential in changing public discourse about the U.S. war efforts.

Brave New Films has earned the ire of political conservatives, who have called the films "agitation and propaganda." But even critics admit "The way [Greenwald] edits and posts his videos online and urges his viewers to take action is innovative and creative."

== Selected filmography ==
=== Feature documentaries ===
- Outfoxed: Rupert Murdoch's War on Journalism (2004)
- Walmart: The High Cost of Low Price (2005)
- Iraq for Sale: The War Profiteers (2006)
- The Real McCain (2008)
- Rethink Afghanistan (2009)
- Koch Brothers Exposed (2012)
- War On Whistleblowers: Free Press and the National Security State (2013)
- Unmanned: America's Drone Wars (2013)
- Making a Killing: Guns, Greed and The NRA (2014)
- Suppressed: The Fight to Vote (2018)
- Suppressed 2020: The Fight to Vote (2020)
- Racially Charged: America's Misdemeanor Problem (2021)
- Suppressed and Sabotaged: The Fight to Vote (2022)
- Beyond Bars: A Son's Fight for Justice (2022)
- Suppressed and Sabotaged: The Fight to Vote (2024)
- Gaza: Journalists Under Fire (2025)

=== Documentary shorts ===
- Unprecedented: The 2000 Presidential Election (2002)
- Uncovered: The War on Iraq (2004)
- Unconstitutional: The War on Our Civil Liberties (2004)
- The Big Buy: Tom DeLay's Stolen Congress (2006)
- The REAL Rudy (2007)
- Fox Attacks (series) (2007)
- The Real McCain (2007)
- Sick for Profit (2009)
- F35: The Jet That Ate The Pentagon (2014)
- Deport Hate: Anti-Immigration Polices In The USA (2014)
- How Protect and Serve Became Search and Destroy (2015)
- To Prison for Poverty (2015)
- Meet The Nazis That Patrol The US-Mexico Border (2015)
- This is Crazy: Criminalizing Mental Health (2015)
- Immigrants For Sale (2015)
- To Prison For Poverty (2016)
- Over Criminalized: Alternatives To Incarceration (2016)
- Racism is Real (2016)
- College Athletics Are Stealing Your Future (2016)
- White Riots vs Black Protests (2016)
- Restorative Justice: Why Do We Need It? (2017)
- Protect Public Education: Stop Betsy Devos! (2017)
- Immigrant Prisons (2017)
- Healing Trauma: Beyond Gangs and Prisons (2018)
- Tai's Story: College or Bail (2018)
- Living While Black (2019)
- Trump Inc. Lining His Pockets: White House for Sale (2020)
- Pandemic of Hate: Anti-Asian Violence During COVID-19 (2020)
- For Our Heroes (2020)
- Suppressed 2021: The War on Democracy (2021)
- E. Jean Carroll v. Donald Trump (2024)

== Awards ==
- 2020 Social Justice Film Festival: Featurrette Documentary Silver Prize for Suppressed: The Fight to Vote (2019)
- 2019 Teaneck International Film Festival: Winner Juried Award Best Short for Suppressed: The Fight to Vote (2019)
- 2019 American Insight's Free Speech Award for Suppressed: The Fight to Vote (2019)
- 2019 (In)Justice for All Film Festival: Impact Award Healing Trauma: Beyond Gangs and Prison (2018)
- 2018 Culver City Film Festival: Best Original Screenplay Healing Trauma: Beyond Gangs and Prison (2018)
- 2018 Justice on Trial Film Festival Best Short Film for The Bail Trap: American Ransom (2017)
- 2014 Media For A Just Society Award for Our Turn to Dream (2014)
- 2014 LA Webfest Outstanding Reality/Documentary Series for Prison Profiteers (2014)
- 2014 LA Webfest Outstanding Writing in Reality/Documentary Series for Prison Profiteers (2014)
- 2013 Media for a Just Society Award for Law and Disorder
- 2009 Bronze Telly for This Brave Nation
- 2008 Laurel Awards
