= Reactions to the War in Afghanistan (2001–2021) =

Following were the reactions to the Afghanistan War (2001–2021).

== Domestic reactions ==
In November 2001, the CNN reported widespread relief amongst Kabul's residents after the Taliban fled the city, with young men shaving off their beards and women taking off their burqas. Later that month the BBC's longtime Kabul correspondent Kate Clark reported that "almost all women in Kabul are still choosing to veil" but that many felt hopeful that the ousting of the Taliban would improve their safety and access to food.

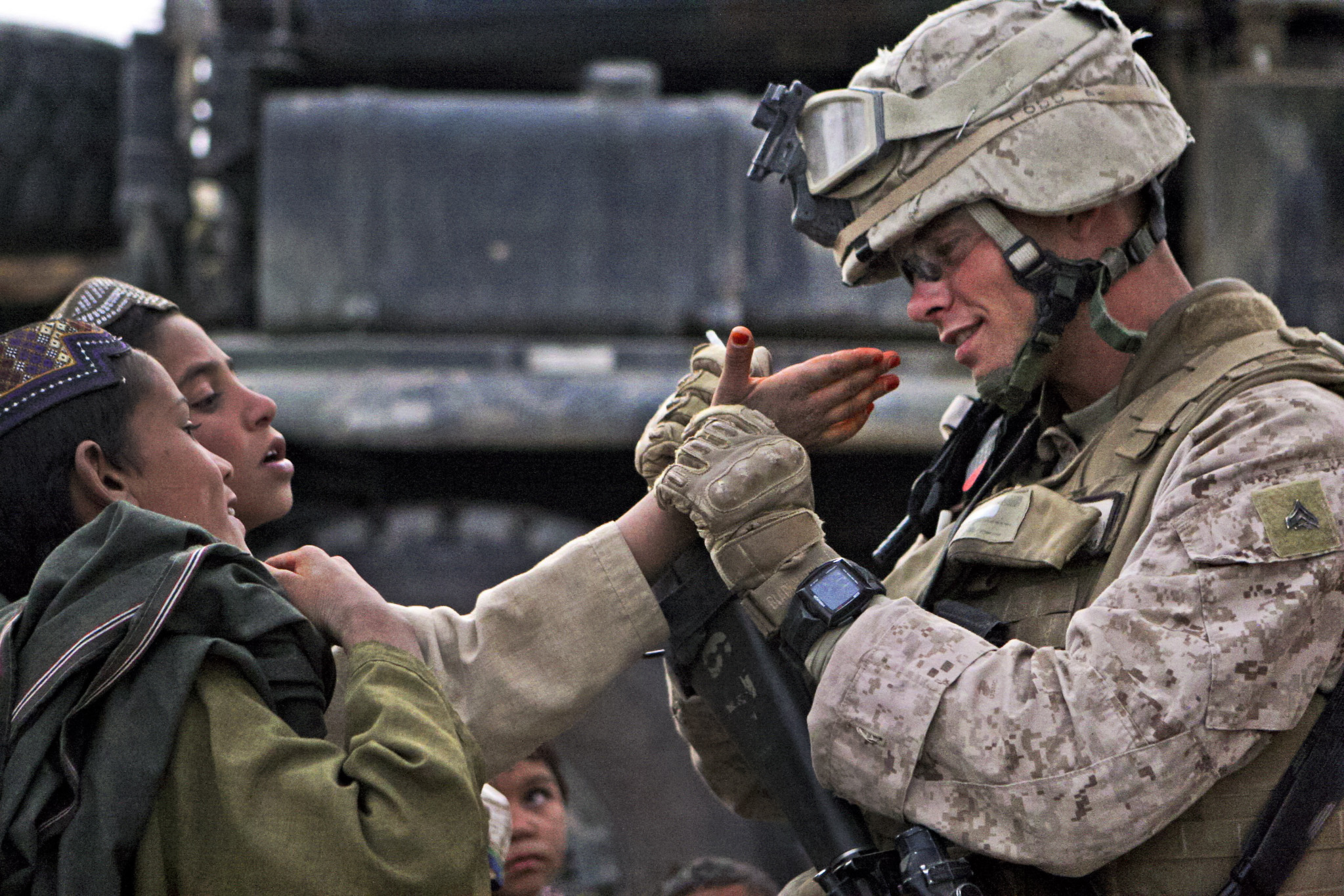
A US marine interacting with Afghan children in Helmand Province

A 2006 WPO opinion poll found that the majority of Afghans endorsed America's military presence, with 83% of Afghans stating that they had a favorable view of the US military forces in their country. Only 17% gave an unfavorable view. The majority of Afghans, among all ethnic groups including Pashtuns, stated that the overthrowing of the Taliban was a good thing. 82% of Afghans as a whole and 71% of those living in the war zone held this anti-Taliban view. The Afghan population gave the US one of its most favorable ratings in the world. A solid majority (81%) of Afghans stated that they held a favorable view of the US. However, the majority of Afghans (especially those in the war zone) held negative views on Pakistan and most Afghans also stated that they believe that the Pakistani government was allowing the Taliban to operate from its soil.

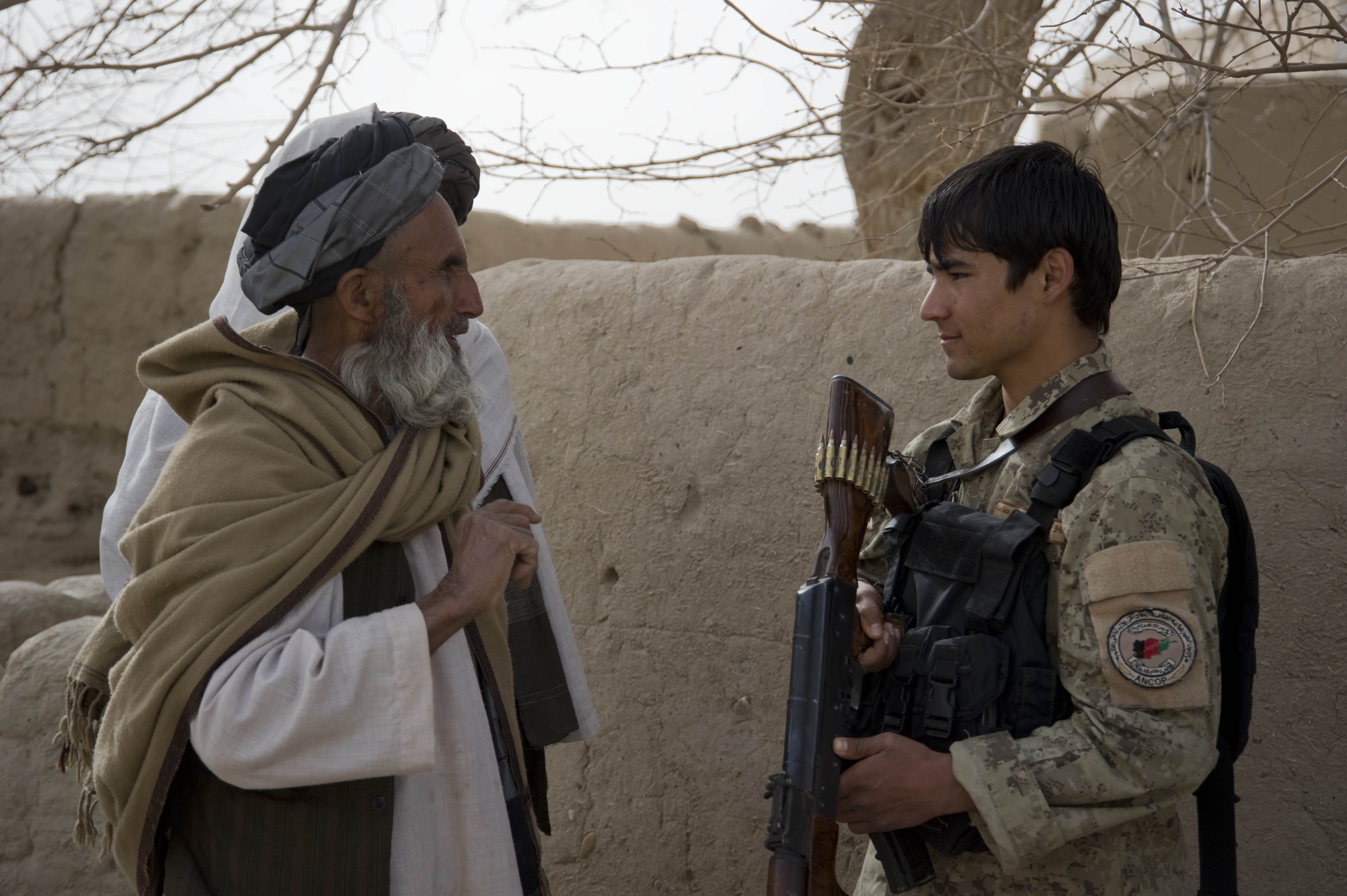
A village elder speaking with an Afghan policeman in Panjwayi District, Kandahar, February 2011.

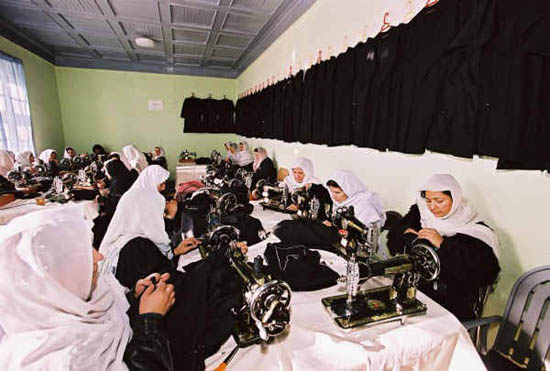
Afghan women sewing school uniforms using materials donated by U.S companies, 2003

According to a May 2009 BBC poll, 69% of Afghans surveyed thought it was at least mostly good that the US military came in to remove the Taliban—a decrease from 87% of Afghans surveyed in 2005. 24% thought it was mostly or very bad—up from 9% in 2005. The poll indicated that 63% of Afghans were at least somewhat supportive of a US military presence in the country—down from 78% in 2005. Just 18% supported increasing the US military's presence, while 44% favored reducing it. 90% of Afghans surveyed opposed the Taliban, including 70% who were strongly opposed. By an 82%–4% margin, people said they preferred the current government to Taliban rule.

In a June 2009 Gallup survey, about half of Afghan respondents felt that additional US forces would help stabilize the security situation in the southern provinces. But opinions varied widely; residents in the troubled South were mostly mixed or uncertain, while those in the West largely disagreed that more US troops would help the situation.

A 2015 survey by Langer Research Associates found that 77% of Afghans support the presence of US forces; 67% also support the presence of NATO forces. Despite the problems in the country, 80% of Afghans still held the view that it was a good thing for the United States to overthrow the Taliban in 2001. More Afghans blame the Taliban or al-Qaeda for the country's violence (53%) than those who blame the US (12%).

A 2019 survey by The Asia Foundation found that 13.4% of Afghans had sympathy for the Taliban while 85.1% of respondents had no sympathy for the group. 88.6% of urban residents had no sympathy compared to 83.9% of rural residents.

== International reactions ==
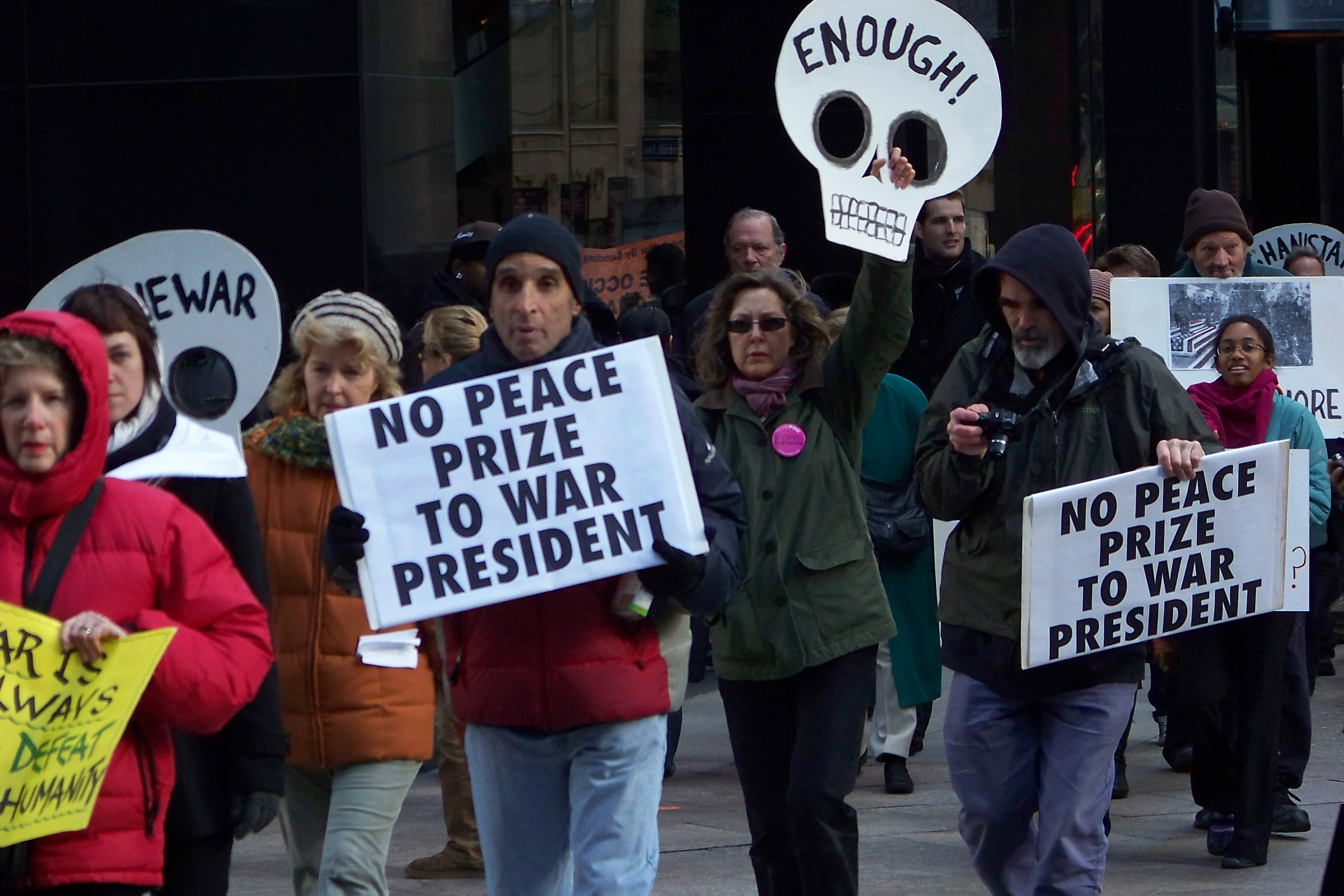
22 December 2009 protest against the war, New York City

A 47-nation global survey of public opinion conducted in June 2007 by the Pew Global Attitudes Project found considerable opposition to the NATO military operations in Afghanistan. Only Israeli and Kenyan citizens were in favor of the war. On the other hand, in 41 of the 47 countries pluralities wanted NATO troops out of Afghanistan as soon as possible. The authors of the survey mentioned a "global unease with major world powers" and in America that "Afghan War not worth it". In 32 out of 47 countries majorities wanted NATO troops out of Afghanistan as soon as possible. Majorities in 7 out of 12 NATO member countries wanted troops withdrawn as soon as possible.

In 2008, there was a strong opposition to war in Afghanistan in 21 of 24 countries surveyed. Only in the US and Great Britain did half the people support the war, with a larger percentage (60%) in Australia. Since then, public opinion in Australia and Britain has shifted, and the majority of Australians and British now also want their troops to be brought home from Afghanistan. Authors of articles on the issue mentioned that "Australians lose faith in Afghan War effort" and "cruel human toll of fight to win Afghan peace". Of the seven NATO countries in the survey, not one showed a majority in favor of keeping NATO troops in Afghanistan – one, the US, came close to a majority (50%). Of the other six NATO countries, five had majorities of their population wanting NATO troops removed from Afghanistan as soon as possible.

The 2009 global survey reported that majorities or pluralities in 18 out of 25 countries wanted NATO to remove their troops from Afghanistan as soon as possible. Despite American calls for NATO allies to send more troops to Afghanistan, there was majority or plurality opposition to such action in every one of the NATO countries surveyed.

== Public opinion in 2001 ==
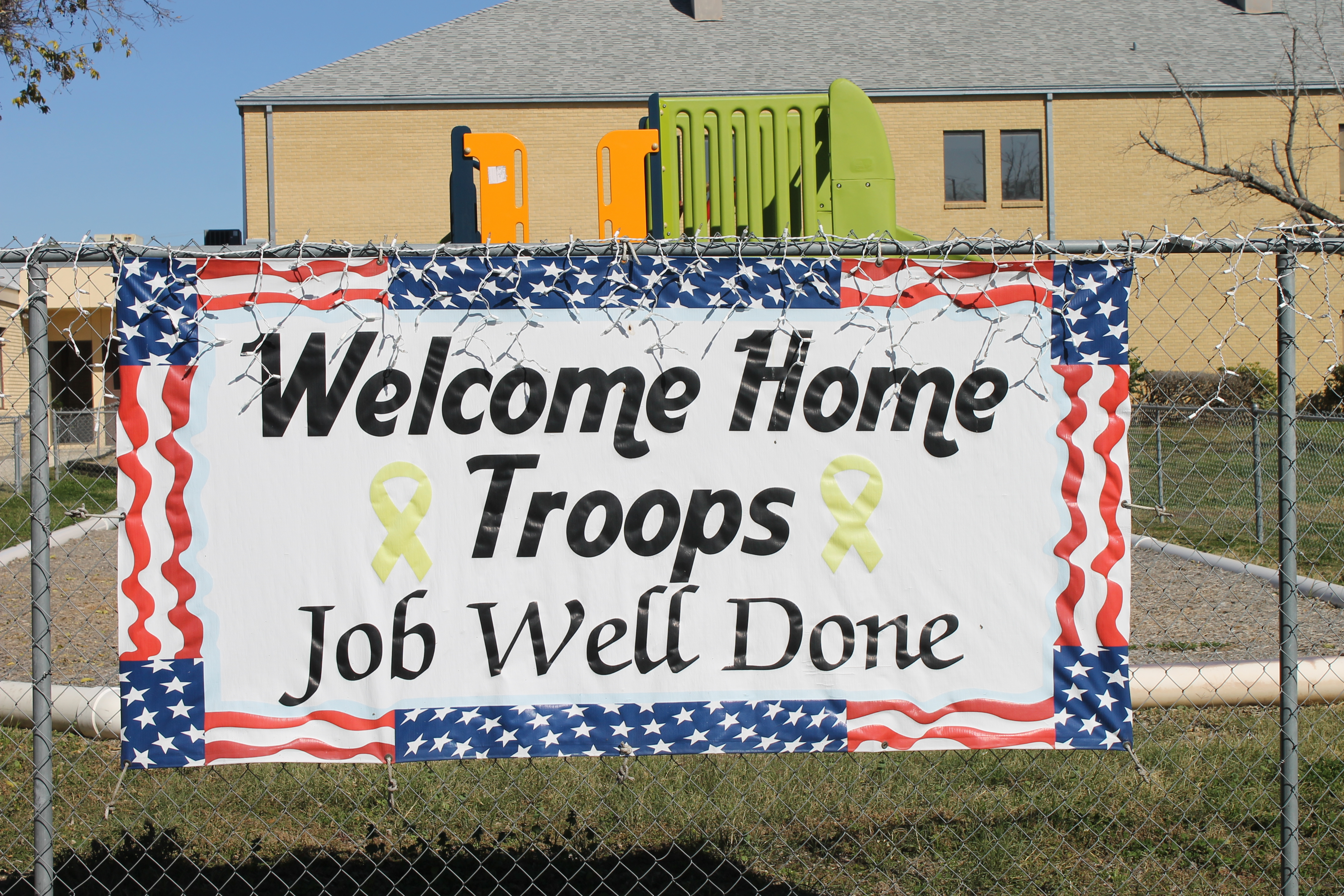
Home-made sign (2015) in Devine, Texas, south of San Antonio, welcomes returning troops from the war in Afghanistan.

When the invasion began in October 2001, polls indicated that about 88% of Americans and about 65% of Britons backed military action.

A large-scale 37-nation poll of world opinion carried out by Gallup International in late September 2001 found that large majorities in most countries favored a legal response, in the form of extradition and trial, over a military response to 9/11: in only three countries out of the 37 surveyed—the US, Israel and India—did majorities favor military action. In the other 34 countries surveyed, the poll found many clear majorities that favored extradition and trial instead of military action: in the United Kingdom (75%), France (67%), Switzerland (87%), Czech Republic (64%), Lithuania (83%), Panama (80%) and Mexico (94%).

An Ipsos-Reid poll conducted between November and December 2001 showed that majorities in Canada (66%), France (60%), Germany (60%), Italy (58%), and the UK (65%) approved of US airstrikes while majorities in Argentina (77%), China (52%), South Korea (50%), Spain (52%), and Turkey (70%) opposed them.

== Development of public opinion ==
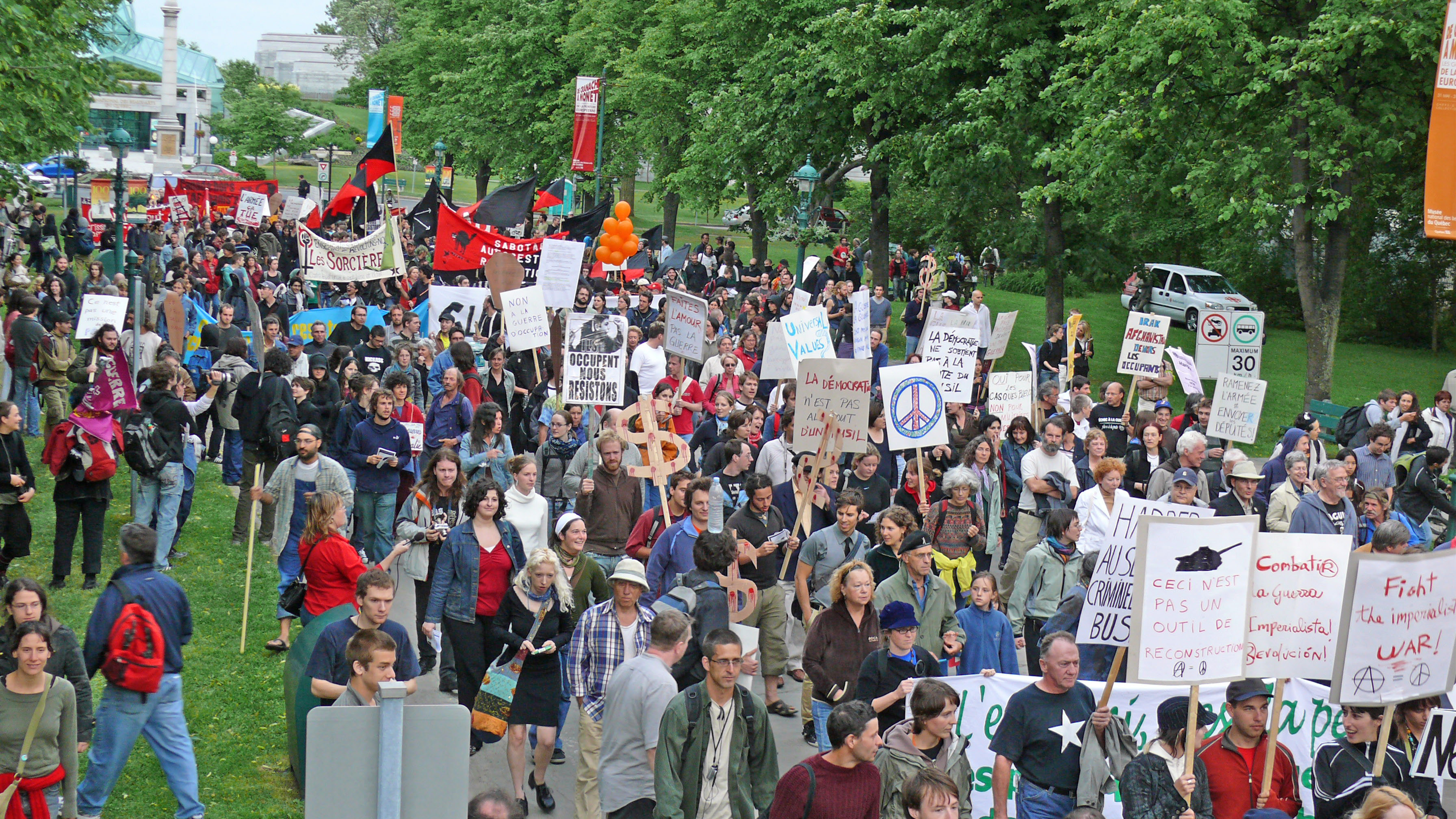
22 June 2007 demonstration in Québec City against the Canadian military involvement in Afghanistan

In a 47-nation June 2007 survey of global public opinion, the Pew Global Attitudes Project found international opposition to the war. Out of the 47 countries surveyed, 4 had a majority that favored keeping foreign troops: the US (50%), Israel (59%), Ghana (50%), and Kenya (60%). In 41, pluralities wanted NATO troops out as soon as possible. In 32 out of 47, clear majorities wanted war over as soon as possible. Majorities in 7 out of 12 NATO member countries said troops should be withdrawn as soon as possible.

A 24-nation Pew Global Attitudes survey in June 2008 similarly found that majorities or pluralities in 21 of 24 countries want the US and NATO to remove their troops from Afghanistan as soon as possible. Only in three out of the 24 countries—the US (50%), Australia (60%), and Britain (48%)—did public opinion lean more toward keeping troops there until the situation has stabilized.

Number of fatalities among Western coalition soldiers involved in the execution of Operation Enduring Freedom from 2001 to 2019.

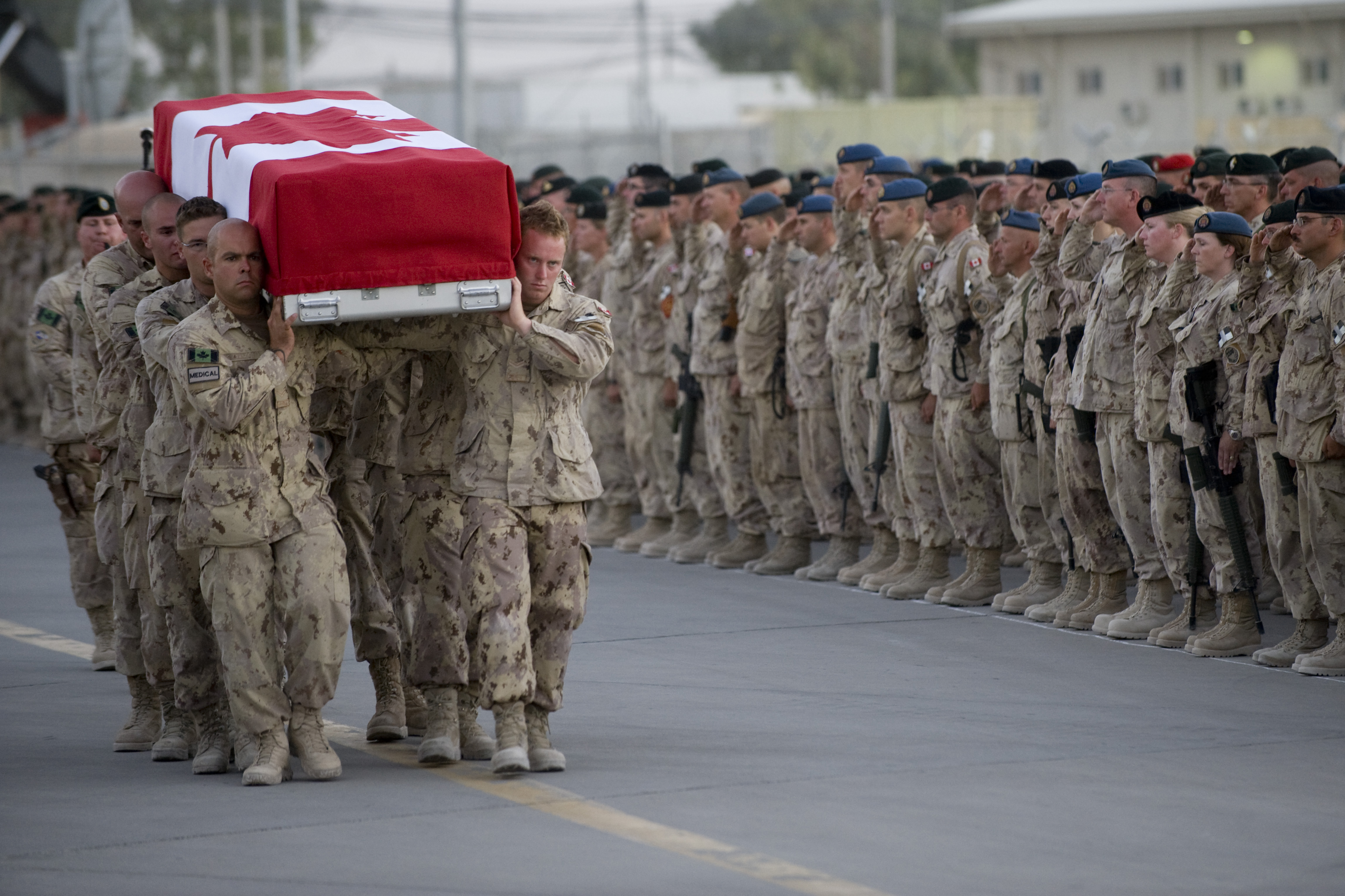
Canadian Forces personnel carry the casket of a fallen comrade onto an aircraft at Kandahar Air Field, 17 July 2009

Following that June 2008 global survey, however, public opinion in Australia and Britain diverged from that in the US. A majority of Australians and Britons now want their troops home. A September 2008 poll found that 56% of Australians opposed continuation of their country's military involvement. A November 2008 poll found that 68% of Britons wanted their troops withdrawn within the next 12 months.

In the US, a September 2008 Pew survey found that 61% of Americans wanted US troops to stay until the situation has stabilized, while 33% wanted them removed as soon as possible. Public opinion was divided over Afghan troop requests: a majority of Americans continued to see a rationale for the use of military force in Afghanistan. A slight plurality of Americans favored troop increases, with 42%–47% favoring some troop increases, 39%–44% wanting reduction, and 7–9% wanting no changes. Just 29% of Democrats favored troop increases while 57% wanted to begin reducing troops. Only 36% of Americans approved of Obama's handling of Afghanistan, including 19% of Republicans, 31% of independents, and 54% of Democrats.

In a December 2009 Pew Research Center poll, only 32% of Americans favored increasing US troops in Afghanistan, while 40% favored decreasing them. Almost half of Americans, 49%, believed that the US should "mind its own business" internationally and let other countries get along the best they can. That figure was an increase from 30% who said that in December 2002.

An April 2011 Pew Research Center poll showed little change in American views, with about 50% saying that the effort was going very well or fairly well and only 44% supporting NATO troop presence in Afghanistan.

Today, about 43 percent of Americans believe the war in Afghanistan was a mistake.

== Protests, demonstrations and rallies ==
The war has been the subject of large protests around the world starting with the large-scale demonstrations in the days leading up to the invasion and every year since. Many protesters consider the bombing and invasion of Afghanistan to be unjustified aggression. The deaths of Afghan civilians caused directly and indirectly by the US and NATO bombing campaigns is a major underlying focus of the protests. In January 2009, Brave New Foundation launched Rethink Afghanistan, a national campaign for non-violent solutions in Afghanistan built around a documentary film by director and political activist Robert Greenwald. Dozens of organizations planned (and eventually held) a national march for peace in Washington, D.C. on 20 March 2010.
