= Unmanned (disambiguation) =

Unmanned usually refers to unmanned vehicles (remote controlled, remote guided or autonomous).

It can also refer to:

- Unmanned: America's Drone Wars, a 2013 documentary film investigating the impact of U.S. drone strikes in Pakistan and elsewhere
- Unmanned reef lights of the Florida Keys
- Unmanned (Y: The Last Man), the first story arc of the comic book Y: The Last Man.

See also:

- Vehicular automation
