= Sally Rubin =

American documentary filmmaker

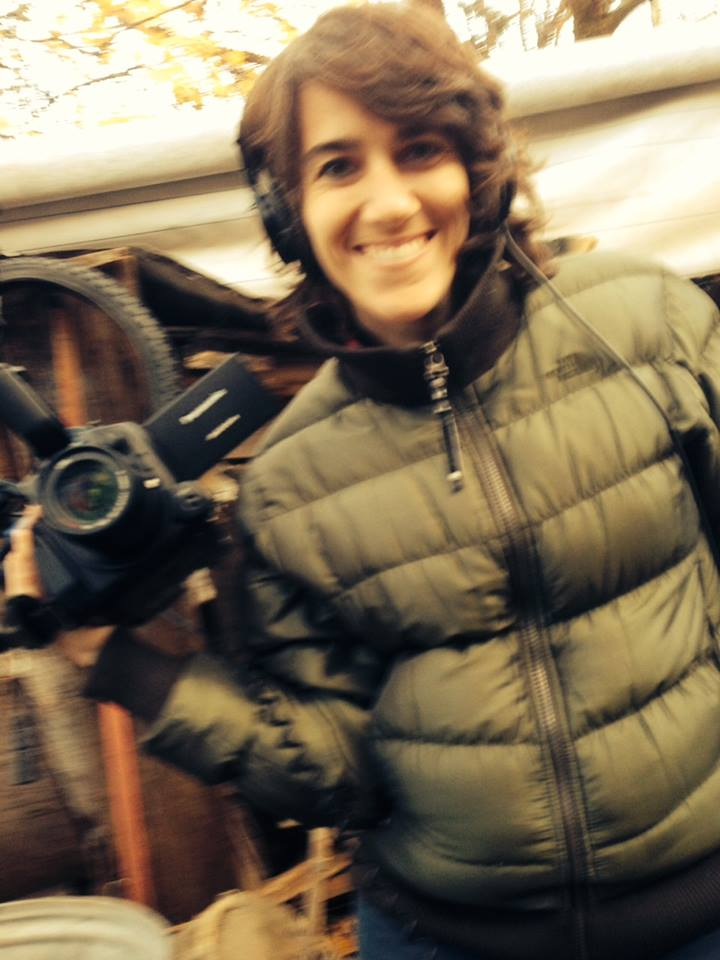
- Born: 9 May; Newton, Massachusetts, U.S.
- Occupation(s): Director, Editor, Producer, Professor
- Years active: 1999 - present

Sally Rubin is an American documentary film director, producer, editor, and professor. She is best known for her work on the documentary films Mama Has a Mustache, Hillbilly, Deep Down, Life on the Line, and The Last Mountain.

== Life and career ==
Rubin was born in Newton, Massachusetts. She graduated from the Tufts University and Stanford University. She is a full-time documentary film professor at Chapman University.

Her documentary, The Last Mountain, about her father's death in a hiking accident, was broadcast on PBS nationally and had a broad festival run including the Mill Valley Film Festival. In 2010, she co-directed the feature documentary, Deep Down, along with Jen Gilomen. The film was funded by the Independent Television Service, the MacArthur Foundation, Chicken and Egg Pictures, and the Fledgling Fund, and tells the story of two friends in eastern Kentucky who find themselves divided over mountaintop removal coal mining near their homes. The documentary aired as part of PBS’ Emmy-winning documentary series Independent Lens in 2010-2011. Rubin and Gilomen received an Emmy Award nomination in the category of New Approaches in Documentary Filmmaking for Deep Down's Virtual Mine project. Deep Down traveled around the world as part of the United States Department's American Documentary Showcase and premiered at the Big Sky Film Festival.

In 2014, Rubin co-directed Life on the Line, along with Jen Gilomen, which premiered at the Santa Barbara Film Festival and aired nationally on PBS. She directed and produced the documentary film, Hillbilly, with Ashley York, about media stereotypes of Appalachia and their impact on the increasing political and cultural divide in the United States. The film premiered in 2018 at the Nashville Film Festival and played at DOC NYC, won the Jury Prize for Best Documentary at the Los Angeles Film Festival, won Michael Moore's award for Best Documentary at the Traverse City Film Festival, and played as the Opening Night Movie at the Hot Springs Documentary Film Festival. Hillbilly was funded by the National Endowment for the Humanities, was picked up by the Orchard/1091 Media for distribution, and was bought by Hulu and Al Jazeera.

In 2021, Rubin directed and produced the animated documentary short, Mama Has a Mustache, about youth and gender identity which premiered at Outfest and screened at Telluride's MountainFilm and the 65th annual San Francisco International Film Festival. In 2021, Rubin also co-directed Appalachian Futures, a piece commissioned by the Smithsonian.

Rubin is currently directing Taking the Reins, a feature-length documentary about the cowboy icon and American identity, with Kristy Guevara-Flanagan. The film is funded by the National Endowment for the Humanities.

Rubin associate produced the Frontline series Country Boys, directed by David Sutherland, and edited Robert Greenwald’s documentary Iraq for Sale: The War Profiteers. She is currently a judge for the Emmy Awards and Peabody Awards.

== Filmography ==
Year	Film	Director	Editor	Producer
2004	The Last Mountain	Yes	Yes	Yes
2004	P.O.V.			Yes
2006	Frontline			Yes
2006	Iraq for Sale: The War Profiteers		Yes	
2007	The ACLU Freedom Files		Yes	
2007	RiverWebs		Yes	
2010	Independent Lens - Deep Down	Yes	Yes	Yes
2010	Deep Down: A Story from the Heart of Coal Country	Yes	Yes	Yes
2010	Breaking Through			Yes
2011	Among Giants			Yes
2011	Without a Home		Yes	Yes
2011	The Modern Man			Yes
2011	Blow!			Yes
2014	Life on the Line: Coming of Age Between Nations	Yes	Yes	Yes
2014	Culture Over Everything			Yes
2014	The Last Orchard			Yes
2016	After Coal: Welsh and Appalachian Mining Communities		Yes	
2018	Hillbilly	Yes		Yes
2019	Relentless			Yes
2019	A Long Series of Right Now			Yes
2019	Slab City			Yes
2019	That Was Ray			Yes
2020	Les Mystères			Yes
2021	Above Snakes			Yes
2021	Bisbee Always Survives			Yes
2021	Mama Has a Mustache	Yes		Yes
2021	Appalachian Futures	Yes		Yes
2021	These Moments			Yes
2022	Uprooted			Yes
2022	Hurricane Hannah			Yes
2025	Dogshit			Yes
