= The Real Rudy =

"The Real Rudy" is a series of four viral videos by documentary film director and activist Robert Greenwald.

The videos criticize former New York City mayor Rudy Giuliani's preparedness for, and handling of, the September 11, 2001 attacks. They were released on September 4 and September 6, 2007. John Nichols, the Washington, D.C. correspondent for The Nation, described the videos as "a powerful series of video exposes that have gone after Giuliani's bitter disputes with 9-11 rescue workers—especially firefighters—over his exploitation of the 2001 terrorist attack on the World Trade Center for political purposes and a host of other scandals involving the GOP frontrunner.". The Democratic National Committee posted a summary of the series on its website.

== Viral video installments ==
- The Real Rudy: Command Center

The video has excerpts from various text documents on the screen. It includes the following from Chris Wallace's Fox News Sunday interview with Giuliani.

The building . . . is not as visible a target as buildings in lower Manhattan.

It also includes the following 9/11 Commission Report excerpt regarding the decision to locate the emergency command center on the 23rd floor of one 7 World Trade Center:

Some questioned locating [the Command Center] both so close to the site of a previous terrorist target and the 23rd floor of a building (difficult to access should elevators become inoperable). There was no backup site.

...OEM headquarters, which could have served as a focal point for information sharing did not play an integrating role in ensuring that information was shared among agencies on 9/11

- The Real Rudy: Mistakes in 30 Seconds

== Featured interviewees ==
Featured interviewees thus far include:

- Andy Ansboro, FDNY firefighter
- Wayne Barrett, investigative reporter, and unofficial biographer of Rudy Giuliani
- Prof. Glenn Corbett, associate professor of fire science, at John Jay College, CUNY
- Jerome Hauer, former emergency management chief, under mayor Giuliani
- Joyce and Russell Mercer, mother and stepfather of one of the firefighters that was caught in the collapse of the Twin Towers
- Jim Riches, a deputy chief at the FDNY, and an officers' union official
- Rita Riches, Jim's wife
- Rosaleen and Eileen Tallon, sister and mother of another FDNY fighter that perished in the collapse of the Towers

== Production credits ==
- Brave New Films, production company
- Robert Greenwald, director
- Leda Maliga, producer
- Lissette Roldan, editor
- Jim Gilliam, director of media and strategy
- Greenwald cited Sally Regenhard, the activist mother of fallen 9/11 FDNY firefighter Christian Regenhard.

== See also ==
- Health effects of the September 11, 2001 attacks
- September 11, 2001 radio communications
- Rudy Giuliani: Urban Legend
