= War on Whistleblowers: Free Press and the National Security State =

- Directed by: Robert Greenwald
- Produced by: Brave New Films
- Music by: Nuno Malo
- Release date: April 19, 2013
- Running time: 66min
- Country: USA
- Language: English

War on Whistleblowers: Free Press and the National Security State is a 66-minute documentary by Robert Greenwald and Brave New Foundation, released in 2013.

== Synopsis ==
War on Whistleblowers highlights recent cases where American government employees and contractors took to the media to expose fraud and abuse. In all cases the whistleblowing was to the detriment of their professional and personal lives. With President Obama's commitment to transparency and the passage of the Whistleblower Protection Enhancement Act, there was hope that whistleblowers would finally have more protection and encouragement to speak up. But according to the film, times have never been worse for national security whistleblowers. The Obama administration attacked more whistleblowers under the Espionage Act than all previous administrations combined. According to Whistleblowers, journalists are also harassed for covering these stories. War on Whistleblowers premiered in April 2013 in theaters and on DVD.

== Interviewees ==
=== Journalists ===
- David Carr, Journalist, The New York Times
- Lucy Dalglish, Dean of the Philip Merrit College of Journalism, University of Maryland
- Glenn Greenwald, Journalist, The Guardian
- Seymour Hersh, Journalist
- Michael Isikoff, National Investigative Correspondent for NBC News
- Bill Keller, Op-Ed Columnist, The New York Times
- Eric Lipton, Investigative Reporter, The New York Times
- Jane Mayer, Staff Writer, The New Yorker
- Dana Priest, Investigative Reporter, The Washington Post
- Tom Vanden Brook, Journalist, USA Today
- Sharon Weinberger, National Security Reporter

=== Whistleblowers ===
- Michael DeKort, Senior Project Manager at Lockheed Martin
- Thomas Drake, Former Senior Executive of the National Security Agency
- Franz Gayl, Deputy Branch Head for the Space and Information Operations Integration Branch
- Thomas Tamm, Criminal Defense Litigation Attorney

=== Experts ===
- Steven Aftergood, Director of the Project on Government Secrecy at the Federation on American Scientists
- Danielle Brian, Executive Director at the Project on Government Oversight
- Tom Devine, Legal Director of the Government Accountability Project
- Ben Freeman, National Security Investigator at the Project on Government Oversight
- William Hartung, Director of the Arms and Security Project at the Center for International Policy
- J. William Leonard, Former Director of the Information Security Oversight Office
- Jesselyn Radack, Director of National Security and Human Rights at the Government Accountability Project
- Pete Sepp, Executive Vice President for the National Taxpayers Union
- Pierre Sprey, Defense Analyst and Weapons Designer
- Winslow T. Wheeler, Director of the Straus Military Reform Project of the Project on Government Oversight

== Critical reception ==
War on Whistleblowers was reviewed in both the general and the progressive media.

The general media generally gave positive reviews. Rotten Tomatoes gave it a "fresh" rating. The Village Voice called it "Fast-moving and sleekly crafted...accessible without sacrificing nuance or intelligence." Booklist commented on the importance of the message while Bloomberg noted the subject's timeliness.
