= Urban legend (disambiguation) =

Urban legend normally refers to a modern folklore, compelling stories often thought to be factual by those who circulate them.

Urban legend may also refer to:

== Films and television ==
- Urban Legend (film), a 1998 film
- Urban Legends: Final Cut, a 2000 film, the first sequel to the 1998 Urban Legend film
- Urban Legends: Bloody Mary, a 2005 film, the second sequel to the 1998 Urban Legend film
- Rudy Giuliani: Urban Legend, a film criticizing former New York City Mayor Rudy Giuliani
- Urban Legends (TV series), a 2007 television series broadcast on the Biography Channel

== Music ==
- Urban Legend (album), a 2004 album by rapper T.I.
- Urban Legend (musicians), musical artist with members J-Radical and Kool Kojac
- Urban Legend, a 2011 psytrance album by Vibe Tribe

== See also ==
- Urban Myths (disambiguation)
- Urban Tales, a Portuguese rock music project
