= Zubair Shah =

Pakistani journalist

Pir Zubair Shah is a Pakistani journalist from South Waziristan in Khyber Pakhtunkhwa, Pakistan. Since 2015, he has been working as a Multimedia Journalist with Voice of America.

From 2008 to 2011, Shah worked as a reporter for The New York Times covering the tribal regions along the Afghan border. In 2008, he and freelance journalist Akhtar Soomro were kidnapped by the Pakistani Taliban (TTP) from Ziarat Marble in Lakaro tehsil while working on assignment for The New York Times. They were released after one day.

Shah has also worked with and published in Newsday, Washington Times, and at other Western media outlets. In 2009, he shared the Pulitzer Prize for International Reporting with Jane Perlez, Eric P. Schmitt and Mark Mazzetti for his work at the New York Times.

From 2011 to 2012, Shah was a fellow at the Nieman Foundation for Journalism at Harvard University.

He holds a BA in Political Science and English Literature from the University of Peshawar and a Master's in International Relations from Quaid-e-Azam University.
