= Rethink Afghanistan =

- Directed by: Robert Greenwald
- Release date: October 2, 2009 (M.U.C.K.)
- Language: English

Rethink Afghanistan is a 2009 documentary by Robert Greenwald and Brave New Films, about the US military presence in Afghanistan following the terrorist attacks of September 11, 2001.

Produced and released eight years into the war, at a time when Congress was considering sending tens of thousands of new troops to Afghanistan, the film asks the American public to reconsider basic questions about the conflict, such as how much will it cost, in lives and money? How long will Americans troops be there? How do we know if we’ve won? What is our exit strategy?

The film was initially made available for free, online, in six consecutive chapters. This staggered release allowed the filmmakers to stay atop an ever-changing news cycle. Greenwald characterized it as "the first real-time documentary."

== Synopsis ==
Part 1: More Troops + Afghanistan = Catastrophe, questions the value of increasing the number of US troops in Afghanistan.

Part 2: The Most Dangerous Country in the World argues that the ongoing conflict may further destabilized Pakistan, an unpredictable and volatile nuclear power.

Part 3: The Cost of War explores the financial impact of the war, calculating that it could easily cost American taxpayers in excess of a trillion dollars.

Part 4: Civilian Casualties looks at the death and damage that children and other innocent non-combatants suffer as the war continues.

Part 5: Women of Afghanistan debunks the claim that American troops support a feminist revolution. In this chapter, Afghan women report that they are suffering more than they did under the Taliban.

Part 6: Security features a variety of CIA and other experts predict that this military action will ultimately make the US less safe, increase anti-American sentiment abroad, and create more terrorists.

== Objectives ==
The documentary campaign was designed to change the media narrative about the war, ultimately aimed at ending US involvement in Afghanistan. The key message, that military solutions won't change ingrained political, social and economic problems in Afghanistan, lead to the conclusion that US policy needed to be rethought to reflect that reality. Greenwald stated that the film was intended as an organizing tool and "our mission is to reach as many people as possible and motivate them to take action."

== Production and distribution ==
At the time of production, Greenwald determined that the topic of the Afghanistan war was extremely time sensitive, as policy was being decided in Washington concurrently, including decisions regarding a 2009 troop "surge." This informed his decision to release the film in sequential segments, on a shoestring, fundraising as he went along.

Brave New Films released the short chapters on the internet, an innovative distribution method at the time. As well as being streamed for free online, the completed film ran in a limited theatrical release, and was available on DVD. Rethink Afghanistan was also shown at thousands of Brave New Films’ signature "house parties."

== Impact ==
One of the first successes of the campaign occurred early in production. In July 2009, Greenwald and Brave New Films successfully helped retired Corporal Rick Reyes and other veterans testify before Sen. John Kerry and the Senate Committee on Foreign Relations. Reyes, who served in both Iraq and Afghanistan, told the committee, "Sending more troops will not make the US safer; it will only build more opposition against us. I urge you on behalf of truth and patriotism to consider carefully and Rethink Afghanistan."

At the time, support for the war and for the "surge" of 33,000 troops was about 52%. As the Rethink Afghanistan campaign progressed, that support dropped precipitously to 17%, lower than either Iraq or Vietnam.

By July 18, 2010, the Rethink Afghanistan campaign had become part of the major media narrative, to the point that Newsweek borrowed the title and idea for their cover story. Capitol Hill got the message by June 2011, when President Obama announced an accelerated timetable for the withdrawal of American troops. As of February 2014, the US was on track for full troop withdrawal by the end of 2014.

== Participants ==
- Anand Gopal – Afghanistan correspondent, Christian Science Monitor
- Robert Pape – professor, political science, and author, Dying to Win
- Andrew Bacevich – professor, international relations and history and author, The Limits of Power
- Faiysal Alikhan – founder FIDA (Foundation for Integrated Development Action) and executive director, The PESCO Group
- Stephen Kinzer – foreign correspondent and author, Overthrow
- Ruslan Aushev – lieutenant general, Russian Army (Ret.) and chief, Committee of Russian Afghan Veterans
- Thomas J. Barfield – professor, anthropology and president, The American Institute of Afghanistan Studies
- Dr. Ramazan Bashardost – member, Afghan Parliament and presidential candidate
- Shukria Barakzai – member, Afghan Parliament and founder and editor-in-chief, Aina-e-Zan (Women's Mirror)
- Mohammed Osman Tariq – former Mujahid commander, Soviet-Afghan War and president, The National Council for Peace and Democracy in Afghanistan
- Carl Conetta - co-director, The Project on Defense Alternatives
- Tariq Ali - historian and author, The Duel: Pakistan on the Flight Path of American Power
- Steve Coll - president and CEO, New America Foundation and author, Ghost Wars
- Ahmed Rashid - Pakistani journalist and author, Descent into Chaos: The U.S. and the Failure of Nation Building in Pakistan, Afghanistan and Central Asia
- Rory Stewart - director, The Carr Center for Human Rights Policy, Harvard University and author, The Places in Between
- Catherine Collins - co-author, The Man from Pakistan
- Lawrence Korb - senior fellow, Center for American Progress and senior advisor, Center for Defense Information
- Linda Blimes - co-author, The Three Trillion Dollar War
- SSG. Christopher Bentley - United States Marine Corps
- Winslow Wheeler - director, Straus Military Reform Project
- Jo Comerford - executive director, National Priorities Project
- Pratap Chatterjee - managing editor, Corpwatch
- Sonali Kolhatkar - Afghan Women's Mission
- Erica Gaston - CIVIC (Campaign for Innocent Victims in Conflict)
- Ann Jones - author, Kabul in Winter
- Orzala Ashraf Nemet - Afghan Women's Network
- Kavita Ramdas - president and CEO, Global Fund for Women
- Sharmeen Obaid-Chinoy - journalist and filmmaker
- Fahima Vorgetts – director, Afghan Women's Fund
- Fatana Gailani – founder, Afghanistan Women's Council
- Robert Baer – former CIA Field Operative, Middle East and author, See No Evil
- Graham Fuller – former CIA station chief, Kabul, Afghanistan and former vice-chair, National Intelligence Council
- Tom Hayden – author, The Long Sixties
- Robert Grenier- former CIA station chief, Islamabad, Pakistan and former director, Counterterrorism Center
- Ursala Rahmani – former Taliban official
- Juan Cole – author, Engaging the Muslim World
