= Cesar's Last Fast =

- Sundance poster
- Directed by: Richard Ray Perez; Lorena Parlee
- Produced by: Molly O'Brien; Lisa Remington; Richard Ray Perez; Lorena Parlee
- Cinematography: James Chressanthis; James R. Dunham; Stephen McCarthy; Jonathan Schell; Byron Shah
- Edited by: Jean-Philippe Boucicaut; Lewis Erskine; Carla Gutierrez; Christopher S. Johnson
- Music by: Ed Barguiarena
- Production company: Monkey Mind Media
- Release date: January 19, 2014 (Sundance)
- Running time: 100 minutes
- Country: United States
- Language: English

Cesar's Last Fast is a 2014 American documentary film co-directed and produced by Richard Ray Perez and Lorena Parlee. The film premiered in the U.S. Documentary Competition at the 2014 Sundance Film Festival on January 19, 2014.

Before the premiere of the film at Sundance Film Festival, Pivot and Univision News acquired the TV rights to the film. The film will premiere simultaneously in English on Pivot and in Spanish on the Univision Network.

== Plot ==
The film narrates the events of 1988, when Cesar Chavez began his "Fast for Life," a 36-day water-only hunger strike, to draw attention to the horrific effects of unfettered pesticide use on farm workers, their families, and their communities.

== Reception ==
The film received mixed to positive response from critics. Dennis Harvey in his review for Variety said that "While not necessarily the definitive cinematic account of Chavez's life or the UFW movement, Cesar's Last Fast provides a well-crafted, sometimes stirring encapsulation." Justin Lowe of The Hollywood Reporter gave the film positive review and said that "A reverential perspective on America's renowned union founder and leader." Carlos Aguilar from Indiewire in his review said that "Touching, insightful, and extremely well crafted, Richard Ray Perez's work shows above all an admiration for a man whose life wasn't entirely his but of his people."
