= Urban Myths =

Urban Myths may refer to:

- Urban myths or urban legends
- Urban Myths (TV series), a British biographical comedy drama anthology television series
- Urban Myths (film), a 2022 South Korean anthology horror film

== See also ==
- Urban legend (disambiguation)
