= Outfoxed =

2004 documentary film

- Directed by: Robert Greenwald
- Distributed by: MoveOn.org; Brave New Films
- Release date: July 13, 2004
- Running time: 78 minutes
- Budget: US$200,000

Outfoxed: Rupert Murdoch's War on Journalism is a 2004 documentary film by filmmaker Robert Greenwald about Fox News Channel's and its owner's, Rupert Murdoch, promotion of conservative views. The film says this bias belies the channel's motto of being "Fair and Balanced".

The documentary had a limited theatrical release, was distributed in DVD format by the political action committee MoveOn.org, and was sold online through Internet retailers such as Amazon.com. MoveOn.org had helped promote the DVD release by taking out a full-page advertisement in The New York Times.

Following the release of Outfoxed, Greenwald and Brave New Films produced a related series of anti-Fox viral videos, collectively entitled Fox Attacks. In an interview, Greenwald stated his goal in making the film: "What we set out to do was to show that, in fact, the entire Fox News was not a news organization. The goal was not just to change that narrative but to change the impact that Fox News often had on legitimate journalists." Fox News criticized the film, saying that it constituted "illegal copyright infringement" for using clips of its shows and said that the film misrepresented the employment of four people identified as former Fox News employees.

== Synopsis ==
The film examines the global growth of Murdoch's media enterprise in the context of concentration of media ownership considerations, and evaluates the effect of having one person in control of a large media conglomerate on freedom of the press.

Some of Outfoxed's coverage includes:

- Review of Fox News's coverage during the lead-up to, and the aftermath of, the 2003 invasion of Iraq.
- Interviews with former Fox News journalists, discussing incidents where Fox News allegedly pressured journalists to slant their reports towards support for the Republican Party.
- Instances where Fox News commentators such as Bill O'Reilly intimidate guests with whom they disagree, such as author and activist Jeremy Glick.
- Studies which claim more airtime and coverage is consistently given to Republican politicians, particularly those in the George W. Bush administration, than to Democrats.
- Examination of whether Fox News' premature result-calling of the 2000 presidential election contributed to George W. Bush officially being elected.
- Scrutiny of Fox News management, including Murdoch and president Roger Ailes, both conservatives, in allegedly controlling the network's content, and editorial control from Murdoch on down allegedly ensuring which stories and issues are covered and the strongly conservative perspective of such coverage.

Former Fox News journalists appear in the film critiquing the methods and perceived integrity of their former employer. Jon Du Pre, a former reporter for Fox News's West Coast bureau, said that he had been suspended by Fox News management because his live shots from the Ronald Reagan Presidential Library on Ronald Reagan's birthday — which Du Pre described was like a "holy day" to Fox News's hierarchy — were not "celebratory enough". A former Fox News military contributor, Larry C. Johnson, said that he was in high demand to give on-air analysis on the "war on terrorism", until he called into question on Hannity & Colmes whether or not the United States could fight two wars (in Afghanistan and Iraq) simultaneously, an incident after which Johnson says he was ignored as a potential Fox News contributor.

== Participants ==
- Eric Alterman
- David Brock
- Richard A. Clarke
- Jeff Cohen
- Walter Cronkite
- Al Franken
- John Nichols
- Bernie Sanders

== Reception ==
Outfoxed received positive reviews from critics. On Rotten Tomatoes the film has a score of 85% based on reviews from 60 critics.

Variety reviewer David Rooney wrote that the film "provides stimulating evidence of how thoroughly news can be skewed, political agendas served and a climate of fear created by a news net selling itself as an objective information service". He compares it favorably to Michael Moore's documentary Fahrenheit 9/11, adding that without the "media spotlight" that surrounded Moore's film, Outfoxed "appears unlikely to reach beyond a liberal audience with an already vehement aversion to Fox News' partisan coverage".

Howard Kurtz of The Washington Post praised Greenwald's uncovering of "...a handful of memos from a top Fox executive", which he argued suggested network bias over the war in Iraq and the investigation of the September 11 attacks. Kurtz was critical of how Greenwald's allegations relied on "orders, or attitudes, of an unnamed 'they'...", and was critical of the filmmaker for making "...no effort at fairness or balance himself".

In the New York Post, a newspaper owned by Rupert Murdoch's News Corporation, Megan Lehmann called the film a "narrowly focused, unapologetically partisan documentary" that "is so one-sided, it undermines its own integrity".

== Fox News' response ==
Fox News called the film "illegal copyright infringement" for its use of clips from Fox News Channel programs.

Fox News also said that the film misrepresented the employment of four people identified as former Fox News employees. Fox News said Alexander Kippen and Frank O'Donnell had actually been employees of WTTG, the Fox owned-and-operated station in Washington, D.C., and not employees of Fox News Channel. It said that Jon Du Pre, identified as a former anchor in the film, had actually been a reporter, and that his contract had not been renewed because he was "a weak field correspondent and could not do live shots". It said that Clara Frenk, identified as a former producer in the film, had actually been a "pool booker" who "expressed no concern about the editorial process" while employed there. Fox also pointed out that Frenk had been a volunteer for Bill Clinton's 1992 Presidential campaign.

Fox News challenged any news organization that thought this was a major story to "put out 100 percent of their editorial directions and internal memos [and] Fox News Channel will publish 100 percent of our editorial directions and internal memos, and let the public decide who is fair".

== See also ==
- Alternative media (U.S. political right)
- Fox News controversies
- List of documentaries
- Media bias in the United States
- The medium is the message
- Politico-media complex
- Propaganda model
