= John Nichols (journalist) =

American journalist and author

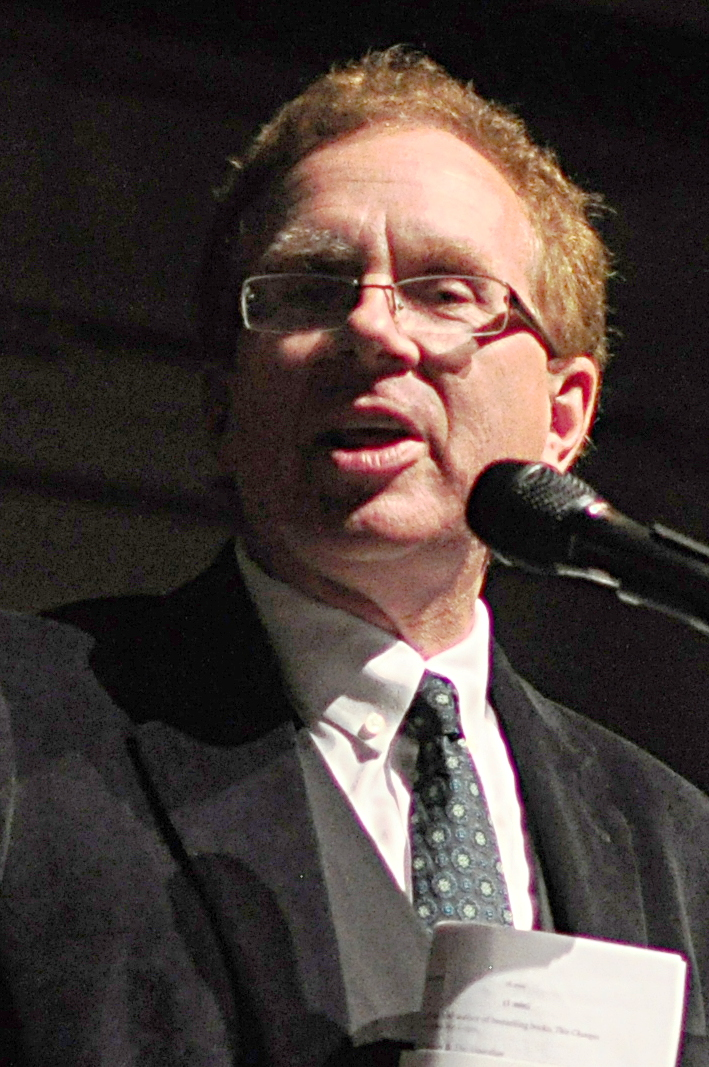
- Nichols in 2015
- Born: February 3, 1959 (age 67); Wisconsin, United States
- Education: University of Wisconsin–Parkside; Graduate School of Journalism, Columbia University
- Occupations: Journalist; Author
- Employer(s): The Nation, The Capital Times
- Notable work: "It's OK to Be Angry About Capitalism"
- Spouse: Mary Bottari
- Children: Whitman Bottari
- Awards: Clarion Award

John Harrison Nichols (born February 3, 1959) is an American journalist and author. He is the executive editor of the liberal and progressive The Nation magazine and associate editor of The Capital Times newspaper. Nichols co-authored "It's OK to Be Angry About Capitalism" with Senator Bernie Sanders, which became a New York Times Best Seller. Other books authored or co-authored by Nichols include The Genius of Impeachment and The Death and Life of American Journalism.

== Early life and education ==
Nichols grew up in Union Grove, Wisconsin.

Nichols holds a master's degree from Columbia University Graduate School of Journalism and bachelor's degree from the University of Wisconsin–Parkside. He used to be the national correspondent for newspapers in Toledo and Pittsburgh.

== Career ==
He works as the Executive Editor of The Nation Magazine in New York and an editor for The Capital Times based in Madison, Wisconsin. Nichols was formerly the Washington correspondent for The Nation and wrote "The Beat" blog for the magazine. He is a regular contributor to In These Times and The Progressive. He appears in the documentary films Outfoxed, Unprecedented: The 2000 Presidential Election, Orwell Rolls in His Grave, and Call It Democracy. Nichols is co-founder, with Robert McChesney and Josh Silver, of Free Press.

Nichols is a regular radio and TV guest of many liberal and progressive talk shows, including The Ed Show with Ed Schultz on MSNBC, Up with Chris Hayes on MSNBC, The Drive Home with Sly on The Big Oldies WEKZ 93.7 (Monroe, WI), Thom Hartmann, and Jon Wiener on KPFK in Los Angeles.

== Personal life ==
He lives in Madison, Wisconsin with his wife Mary Bottari, who is the Director of Strategic Partnerships for Law Forward and the former chief of staff for the city of Madison.

== Bibliography ==
=== Books ===
- It's the Media, Stupid! By John Nichols and Robert W. McChesney. New York: Seven Stories Press, 2000.
- Jews for Buchanan: Did You Hear the One About the Theft of the American Presidency?. By John Nichols with David Deschamps. New York: New Press, 2001.
- Our Media, Not Theirs: The Democratic Struggle Against Corporate Media. By Robert W. McChesney and John Nichols. New York: Seven Stories, 2002.
- Dick: The Man Who Is President / The Rise and Rise of Richard B. Cheney: Unlocking the Mysteries of the Most Powerful Vice President in American History. By John Nichols. New York: New Press, 2004/2005.
- The Genius of Impeachment: The Founders' Cure for Royalism. By John Nichols. New York: New Press, 2006.
- Tragedy & Farce: How the American Media Sell Wars, Spin Elections and Destroy Democracy. By John Nichols and Robert W. McChesney. New York: New Press, 2006
- The Death and Life of American Journalism: The Media Revolution that Will Begin the World Again. By Robert W. McChesney and John Nichols. New York: Nation Books, 2010.
- The "S" Word: a Short History of An American Tradition ... Socialism. By John Nichols. New York: Verso, 2011.
- Uprising: How Wisconsin Renewed the Politics of Protest, from Madison to Wall Street. By John Nichols. New York: Nation Books, 2012.
- Dollarocracy: How the Money-and-Media-Election Complex is Destroying America. By John Nichols and Robert W. McChesney. New York: Nation Books, 2013.
- People Get Ready: The Fight Against a Jobless Economy and a Citizenless Democracy. By Robert W. McChesney & John Nichols. New York: Nation Books 2016.
- Horsemen of the Trumpocalypse: A Field Guide to the Most Dangerous People in America. by John Nichols. New York: Nation Books, August 2017. ISBN 978-1568587806, 978-1568587790
- The Fight for the Soul of the Democratic Party: The Enduring Legacy of Henry Wallace's Anti-Fascist, Anti-Racist Politics by John Nichols. Verso Books, April 2020. ISBN 9781788737401
- Coronavirus Criminals and Pandemic Profiteers: Accountability for Those Who Caused the Crisis, by John Nichols. Verso Books, Jan. 2022. ISBN 9781839763779
- It's OK to Be Angry About Capitalism by Senator Bernie Sanders and John Nichols. Penguin Random House, Feb. 2023, a New York Times Best Seller. ISBN 9780593238714

=== Articles ===
- 2009: John Nichols and Robert W. McChesney. "The Death and Life of Great American Newspapers", The Nation.
- 2010: John Nichols and Robert W. McChesney. "How to Save Journalism", The Nation.
