= Michael DeKort =

Michael J. DeKort
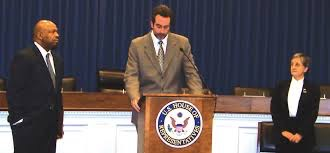
- Michael Dekort at the Carl Barus Award presentation with Rep. Elijah Cummings (D-MD), Chairman of the House Subcommittee on Coast Guard and Maritime Transportation; and at right Ms. Janet Rochester, President of IEEE-SSIT.
- Citizenship: United States
- Occupation: Engineering project manager
- Years active: 1992-2006
- Employer: Lockheed Martin
- Known for: Whistleblowing video on YouTube about the Lockheed Integrated Deepwater System Program

Michael DeKort was an American engineering project manager at Lockheed Martin who posted a whistleblowing video on YouTube about the Lockheed Integrated Deepwater System Program.

== Career ==
DeKort began working as an engineer at Lockheed Martin in 1994. He was working as a lead system engineer in 2003 when he noticed that the equipment Lockheed Martin was installing in U.S. Coast Guard vessels as part of the Deepwater program was faulty. According to DeKort, he alerted the CEO and Board of Directors of Lockheed Martin, but was ignored and removed from his position as project manager. DeKort then reported the equipment problems to the Department of Homeland Security. DeKort felt that the Coast Guard was failing to cooperate adequately with the DHS. His attempts to alert The Washington Post and the Associated Press were unsuccessful. DeKort released a YouTube video on August 3, 2006, detailing the problems with the Deepwater program. The same year, DeKort was laid off from Lockheed Martin. He filed a whistleblower's lawsuit against Lockheed Martin and Northrop Grumman. The lawsuit was settled for an undisclosed sum in 2010.

In 2008, DeKort was awarded the Institute of Electrical and Electronics Engineers–Society on Social Implications of Technology public service award, as well as the Barus Ethics Award from the IEEE for his efforts to ensure accountability and whistleblowing video. The Barus award was presented by U.S. Rep. Elijah Cummings.

In April 2013, DeKort was featured in the documentary, War on Whistleblowers.
