= It's OK to Be Angry About Capitalism =

2023 book by Bernie Sanders

- First edition cover
- Author: Bernie Sanders
- Language: English
- Published: February 21, 2023
- Publisher: Crown Publishing Group
- Publication place: United States
- Media type: Print, e-book, audiobook
- ISBN: 978-0593238714 (Hardcover)

It's OK to Be Angry About Capitalism is a 2023 book written by Bernie Sanders, a member of the United States Senate from Vermont, and edited by John Nichols, a journalist for The Nation. It was published by Crown Publishing Group, a subsidiary of Penguin Random House, on February 21.

== Synopsis ==
Sanders dedicated the book to his older brother, Larry, who introduced him to the writings of Sigmund Freud and Karl Marx, while the family struggled to make ends meet. This interested him in subjects such as politics and history. Larry is a member of the Green Party of England and Wales.

According to Crown, the book is "a progressive takedown of the über-capitalist status quo." Sanders refers to American billionaires as oligarchs. He specifically calls Jeff Bezos, the founder of Amazon, "the embodiment of the extreme corporate greed that shapes our times."

Sanders discusses income inequality in the United States, how the influx of money impacts democracy, and suggests that corporations are contributing to the climate crisis. He warns about technological unemployment stemming from increased automation, calling for increasing taxes on companies that rely excessively on automation to cut costs. Sanders also talks about news deserts and how the lack of local news leads people to pay more attention to conspiracy theories on social media. He advocates for providing federal funding for local media.

In the book, Sanders discusses the failure of the United States Congress to pass the Build Back Better Act, referring to it as "one of the most difficult, demanding, and demoralizing years" of his congressional tenure. He criticizes President Joe Biden for failing to follow through on a campaign promise to end federal contracts with companies that oppose unionization of their employees. Additionally, Sanders writes about his chairmanship of the Senate Budget Committee, his 2016 and 2020 presidential campaigns, the 2020 Democratic Party presidential primaries, the January 6 United States Capitol attack, and the inauguration of Joe Biden, as well as the photo of him attending the latter that became a viral Internet meme.

== Promotion ==
Sanders went on a national tour to promote the book, appearing with Cornel West at the Brooklyn Academy of Music Amphitheater on February 20, at The Anthem in Washington, D.C., on March 1, with Robert Costa at the University of Virginia Center for Politics in Charlottesville, Virginia, on March 2, at the Alex Theatre in Glendale, California, on March 3, with Nichols and Angie Coiro at the California Theatre in San Jose, California, on March 4, and at the Tucson Festival of Books in Tucson, Arizona, on March 5. As part of the book tour, Sanders also visited the UK, including events at Oxford Union at the University of Oxford, where he was awarded honorary membership in the Oxford Union Society, a conversation with Scottish comedian Frankie Boyle in Brighton, and another with left-wing British author Owen Jones as part of The Guardian's Oxford Live series.

Tickets for Sanders' U.S. tour were sold on Ticketmaster, for up to $95 each in Washington. He was paid $170,000 by Penguin Random House for the book. Sanders did not schedule or price the tour and received none of its proceeds.

Sanders also visited the Netherlands, Germany and Belgium to promote the Dutch translation of his book, "Het is oké om kwaad te zijn op het kapitalisme".

== Reception ==
On its release day, February 21, It's OK to be Angry About Capitalism topped Amazon's best-seller list in the U.S. national government, political economy, and economic conditions categories. According to The Sydney Morning Herald, the book is a "damning indictment of the past 40 years of largely unfettered, neoliberal capitalism". Zoe Williams of The Guardian says the book "tackles the grim facts about the economic order that the political establishment wilfully ignores" and "is easily as frustrating and depressing as it is galvanising and uplifting".

== See also ==
- Criticism of capitalism
