= Breaking Up (1997 film) =

1997 American romantic comedy film

- Theatrical release poster
- Directed by: Robert Greenwald
- Screenplay by: Michael Cristofer
- Based on: Breaking Up by Michael Cristofer
- Produced by: Robert Greenwald; George Moffly
- Starring: Salma Hayek; Russell Crowe
- Cinematography: Mauro Fiore
- Edited by: Suzanne Hines
- Music by: Mark Mothersbaugh
- Production company: Regency Enterprises
- Distributed by: Warner Bros.
- Release date: October 17, 1997
- Running time: 89 minutes
- Country: United States
- Language: English
- Box office: $11,690

Breaking Up is a 1997 American romantic drama film directed by Robert Greenwald and written by Michael Cristofer, based on his stage play of the same name. The film stars Russell Crowe and Salma Hayek as Steve and Monica, a couple whose relationship leads to an out-of-the-blue marriage. It was released in the United States by Warner Bros. on October 17, 1997.

== Cast ==
- Russell Crowe as Steve
- Salma Hayek as Monica
- Abraham Alvarez as the Minister

== Reception ==
Ken Eisner of Variety magazine wrote: "Russell Crowe and Salma Hayek make attractive leads, but they have neither the marquee power nor the requisite chemistry to keep Breaking Up from getting left at the altar of general distribution."
