= Mark Mazzetti =

American journalist

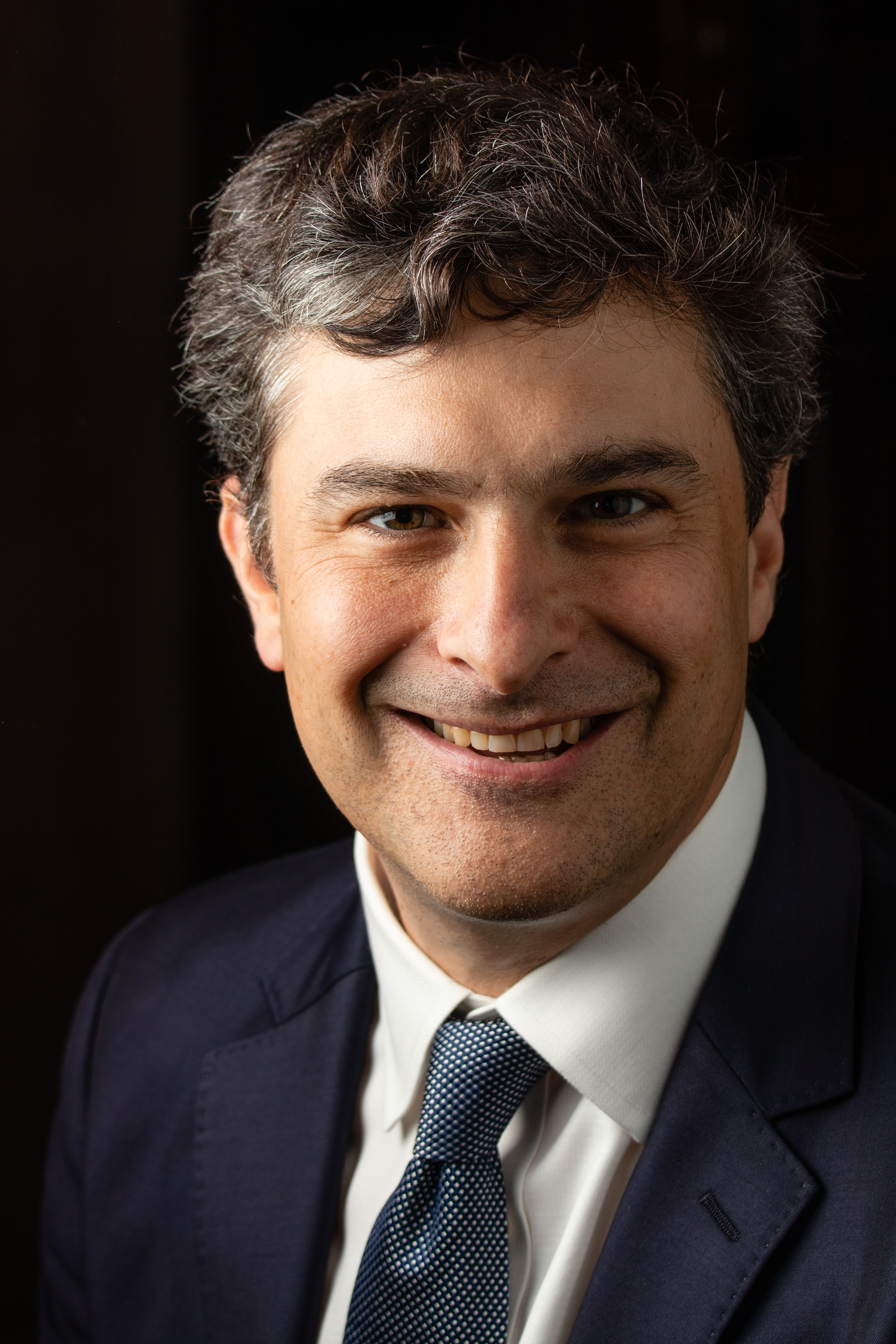
- Mazzetti in 2018
- Born: Mark Mazzetti; May 13, 1974 (age 52); Washington, D.C., U.S.
- Education: Regis High School; Duke University; Oxford University
- Occupation: Journalist
- Spouse: Lindsay Friedman

Mark Mazzetti (born May 13, 1974) is an American journalist who works for the New York Times. He is currently a Washington Investigative Correspondent for the Times.

== Life ==
Mazzetti was born in Washington, D.C. He attended Regis High School in New York City. He graduated from Duke University with a bachelor's degree in Public Policy and History. Later, he earned a master's degree in history from Oxford University.

== Career ==
Mazzetti is a three-time winner of the Pulitzer Prize and a five-time winner of the George Polk award. In 2009, he was part of a team of reporters to win the International Reporting prize for coverage of the rising violence in Afghanistan and Pakistan and Washington's response. In 2018, he shared the prize for National Reporting for groundbreaking coverage of the connections between Donald Trump's advisers and Russia and the widening investigation into Russia's sabotage of the 2016 presidential election. In 2008, he was a Pulitzer finalist for reporting on the C.I.A's detention and interrogation program.

In 1998, shortly after receiving a master's degree from Oxford University, Mazzetti began reporting on national politics as a correspondent for The Economist. After leaving The Economist in 2001, Mazzetti joined the staff of U.S. News & World Report and began reporting on defense and national security as its Pentagon correspondent. In 2004 Mazzetti joined the staff of the Los Angeles Times, and continued working with the Pentagon as a military affairs correspondent.

His book, "The Way of the Knife: The C.I.A., a Secret Army, and a War at the Ends of the Earth," was published in 2013. It was a New York Times bestseller and has been translated into more than 10 languages. The book is an account of the secret wars waged by the C.I.A and Pentagon in the years after the Sept. 11 attacks.

In 2003 Mazzetti spent two months reporting in Baghdad while traveling with the 1st Marine Expeditionary Force.

In late 2007, he broke the story of the CIA's destruction of interrogation video tapes depicting torture of Al Qaeda detainees. The story launched a Justice Department investigation into the episode, and he won the Livingston Award for National Reporting for his work on this story.

The story about the tapes destruction also led to an investigation into the C.I.A.'s detention and interrogation program by the Senate Intelligence Committee. The committee's final report, released in December 2014, found widespread abuses in the program and regular use of torture.

In addition to sharing the Pulitzer Prize for International Reporting in 2009, he won the George Polk award with colleague Dexter Filkins for coverage of the secret wars being waged in Pakistan and Afghanistan.

A 2007 article by Joseph Palermo said that Mazzetti and David Sanger were insufficiently skeptical of anonymous government and military sources in an article they co-wrote in the October 14, 2007, issue of the New York Times. Shortly afterwards, American intelligence agencies confirmed the New York Times' reporting, stating publicly that the Israeli military had struck an Israeli military reactor. In May 2011, Charles Kaiser cited a story written by Mazzetti in collaboration with Helene Cooper and Peter Baker "which credulously adopted the line of former Bush administration officials who were desperately trying to convince the world that torture was the main reason that Bin Laden had been located."

The Puntland Government (Somalia) criticized a piece by Mazzetti and Eric Schmitt that portrayed the Puntland Maritime Police Force (PMPF) as a "private army" that was "abandoned" by its major donors. The article exposed how mercenaries hired by Erik Prince, the former head of Blackwater, training Somalis to combat piracy by the abandoned the program. Puntland officials clarified that the PMPF still is "part and parcel of Puntland Government’s security forces" and that they still receive the financial support from their backers. They also criticized the authors for not acknowledging any of the PMPF's success and for neglecting to contact any Puntland Government officials to comment on the story.

In 2011, he furnished the pre-publication text of an opinion column written by Maureen Dowd concerning the making of the movie "Zero Dark Thirty" to CIA spokesperson Marie Harf for review. Dowd had reportedly asked Mazzetti to fact-check a detail in the column for her. Times managing editor Dean Baquet dismissed the incident as "much ado about nothing," but the Times' public editor expressed strong disapproval of Mazzetti's actions.

In 2016, he was part of a team of reporters who won the George Polk Award for an investigation into operations by Navy SEALs and for a lengthy examination of the operations of SEAL Team 6.

In December 2016, Mazzetti was named Washington Investigations editor, leading a team of reporters to look into all parts of the government and Washington.

== Personal life ==
On May 30, 2010, Mazzetti and Lindsay Friedman were married in Alexandria, Virginia. They have two children.

== Awards ==
- In 2006 Mazzetti received the Gerald R. Ford Prize for Distinguished Reporting on National Defense
- In 2008 Mazzetti received the Livingston award for national reporting, for an exposé revealing the CIA's destruction of controversial video tapes which exposed the United States' interrogation tactics for Al Qaeda detainees
- In 2009 Mazzetti shared a 2009 Pulitzer Prize for international reporting with Jane Perlez, Eric P. Schmitt and Pir Zubair Shah
- In 2018, Mazzetti shared a Pulitzer Prize for deeply sourced, relentlessly reported coverage in the public interest that dramatically furthered the nation’s understanding of Russian interference in the 2016 presidential election and its connections to the Trump campaign.

== Bibliography ==
=== Books ===
- The way of the knife : the CIA, a secret army, and a war at the ends of the Earth. Penguin Press. 2013.

=== Book reviews ===
Year	Review article	Work(s) reviewed
2018	"The Pakistan Trap". The Culture File. Books. The Atlantic. 321 (2): 38–40. March 2018.	Coll, Steve. Directorate S : the C.I.A. and America's secret wars in Afghanistan and Pakistan. Penguin Press.
