= Wal-Mart: The High Cost of Low Price =

- Film poster
- Directed by: Robert Greenwald
- Produced by: Jim Gilliam
- Cinematography: Kristy Tully
- Music by: John Frizzell
- Distributed by: Brave New Films
- Release date: November 4, 2005 (US)
- Running time: 99 minutes
- Language: English
- Budget: $1.5 million

Wal-Mart: The High Cost of Low Price is a 2005 documentary film by director Robert Greenwald and Brave New Films about the American multinational corporation and retail conglomerate Walmart. The film presents a negative picture of Walmart's business practices through interviews with former employees, small business owners, and footage of Walmart executives. Greenwald also uses statistics interspersed between interview footage, to provide an objective analysis of the effects Walmart has on individuals and communities.

== Synopsis ==
The film features archival footage of Walmart CEO Lee Scott praising the corporation at a large employee convention, intercut with interviews designed to undercut Scott's statements.

The documentary argues that Walmart underpays its workers, paying them an average of $17,000 per year (in 2005 dollars). According to the interviews, these wages are too low for employees to afford Walmart's health insurance, so management counsels workers to apply for government programs such as Medicaid instead. Greenwald also claims that Walmart hires undocumented workers for their cleanup crews, paying them well below minimum wage. Other criticisms of the retail mega-chain include Walmart's anti-union practices, its negative effect on mom and pop stores and small communities, insufficient environmental protection policies, and its poor record on worker's rights in the United States and internationally. Scenes filmed abroad document factory workers in Bangladesh and China creating Walmart goods for as little as 18 cents an hour. One 9-year veteran of Walmart testifies that he was moved to tears when he viewed the conditions in clothing manufacturing facilities in Latin America. He reported the abuses but the company did not correct them. The documentary also argues that Walmart's parking lots have unusually high crime rates, a situation that could be vastly improved if the company were willing to spend the money to place cameras outside the stores.

To avoid accusations of a partisan POV, most of Greenwald's interviews are of politically conservative, patriotic, "red state" citizens who are distressed about Walmart's policies and impact.

As the film draws to a close, Greenwald documents the efforts of several communities that have successfully blocked Walmarts from opening in their towns, suggesting that others should do the same.

== Reception ==
=== Critical response ===
Wal-Mart: The High Cost of Low Price has enjoyed critical acclaim and earned a 90% rating on the review aggregator website Rotten Tomatoes, based on 29 reviews. The website's consensus reads, "Clearly one-sided but thoroughly compelling, Wal-Mart: The High Cost of Low Price represents advocacy filmmaking at its most passionate and persuasive." On Metacritic, the film has a score of 71 out of 100, based on reviews from 18 critics.

Ty Burr of The Boston Globe calls it "advocacy journalism at its most unsparing, and it demands to be seen, discussed, argued with, and acted upon." Matthew Turner of The ViewLondon reviews says, "If Greenwald’s intention was to make the audience very angry indeed then the film is a resounding success."

Roger Ebert and Richard Roeper both gave the film a "Thumbs Up" on an episode of "At The Movies". Ebert particularly praised the film for exploring the idea of "getting [those] cheaper prices at the cost of the lives and labor of Walmart employees."

The film has been endorsed and promoted by MoveOn.org; unions, through the Wake Up Wal-Mart and Walmart Watch campaigns; and other groups. Some reviewers have observed that while the documentary features stories of former employees and residents of communities that Walmart has impacted, it does not sufficiently explore the customers' role in Walmart's financial success, despite its business practices.

=== Walmart's response ===
Walmart has disputed the factual accuracy of the statements made in the film. Wal-Mart: The High Cost of Low Price has been credited as one of the reasons that Walmart created a public relations "war room" in late 2005 to respond to criticism.
