= Unprecedented: The 2000 Presidential Election =

- Directed by: Richard Ray Pérez; Joan Sekler
- Written by: William Haugse; Richard Ray Pérez; Joan Sekler
- Produced by: Richard Ray Pérez; Joan Sekler
- Starring: Danny Glover (2004)
- Narrated by: Peter Coyote
- Cinematography: Richard Ray Pérez
- Edited by: William Haugse; Matthew Martin
- Music by: Bobby Johnston
- Distributed by: Shout! Factory
- Release date: September 17, 2002 (U.S. premiere)
- Running time: 47 min. (2002); 57 min. (2004)
- Language: English

Unprecedented: The 2000 Presidential Election is a 2002 47-minute documentary directed and co-written by Richard Ray Pérez and Joan Sekler, and narrated by Peter Coyote, about the contested 2000 presidential election in Florida.

It was re-released in an extended 56-minute 2004 Campaign Edition presented by Danny Glover to tie in with the 2004 US presidential election.

A Public Interest Pictures Film, it was co-executive produced by Robert Greenwald and Earl Katz. Greenwald later made this the first of his "Un-Trilogy", which also includes Uncovered: The War on Iraq and Unconstitutional: The War on Our Civil Liberties.

== Synopsis ==
Unprecedented chronicles irregularities in the 2000 US presidential election in the swing state of Florida.

The film begins with claims that African Americans and other likely Democratic voters were disenfranchised by a resurrected 1868 law that prevented felons from voting. This law was originally intended to keep blacks from the polls, in the wake of the Civil War. In 2000, Florida Secretary of State Katherine Harris used the original law to create a computerized list of supposed ex-cons. The list had the vaguest parameters, and included as many as 57,000 to 91,000 non-felons, who were overwhelmingly people of color. On election day, these people were turned away at the polls. Since 90% of African Americans vote Democratic, this effectively reduced the number of votes for Democratic candidate Al Gore.

Unprecedented also examines the Florida recount and the hanging chad controversy. It faults Gore for demanding a recount of only certain counties, instead of the whole state; and also presents evidence that the Republican Party paid staffers to create a disturbance and end the recount prematurely.

The film then takes aim at the December 2000 Supreme Court decision that gave George W. Bush the presidency. The film documents conflicts of interest that should have resulted in the recusal of two of the SCOTUS justices.

Finally, it explores the problems with electronic voting machines. It argues that the companies that make these machines do not allow audits of the machines (allegedly because of copyright and trademark issues), which leaves them wide open for fraud. The machines also do not give paper receipts, so there is no physical evidence in case of the need for a recount.

== Distribution ==
In the festival circuit, the film won eleven awards, including the Grand Festival award at the Berkley Film and Video Festival; the Grand Jury Prize for Best Documentary, and the Director's Award at the New York International Film Festival. It enjoyed a limited theatrical release and was broadcast internationally on cable. The DVD sold extremely well on Amazon.com, coming in at 68 on their 2004 sales rank. Liberal advocacy group MoveOn sold 25,000 copies in three days. Unprecedented was also viewed at screenings in homes and communities across the country, and was available streaming on the Internet.

This multi-tiered distribution model was revolutionary at the time. Executive Producer Robert Greenwald called it a "breakthrough", and has honed it in his subsequent films.

Unprecedented is said to have "jumpstarted" Greenwald's documentary filmmaking career.

After this film, Sekler went on to produce Unconvention: A Mix-Tape from St. Paul, RNC '08, a documentary about the 2008 Republican National Convention in Saint Paul, Minnesota.

== See also ==
- Bush Family Fortunes (2004)
- Fahrenheit 9/11 (2004)
