= Lakaro =

- Country: Pakistan
- Region: Federally Administered Tribal Areas
- District: Mohmand Agency
- Tehsil: Safi
- Time zone: UTC+5 (PST)
  - Summer (DST): UTC+6 (PDT)

Lakaro is an area of Safi Tehsil, Mohmand Agency, Federally Administered Tribal Areas, Pakistan.
