= Pratap Chatterjee =

Journalist and author

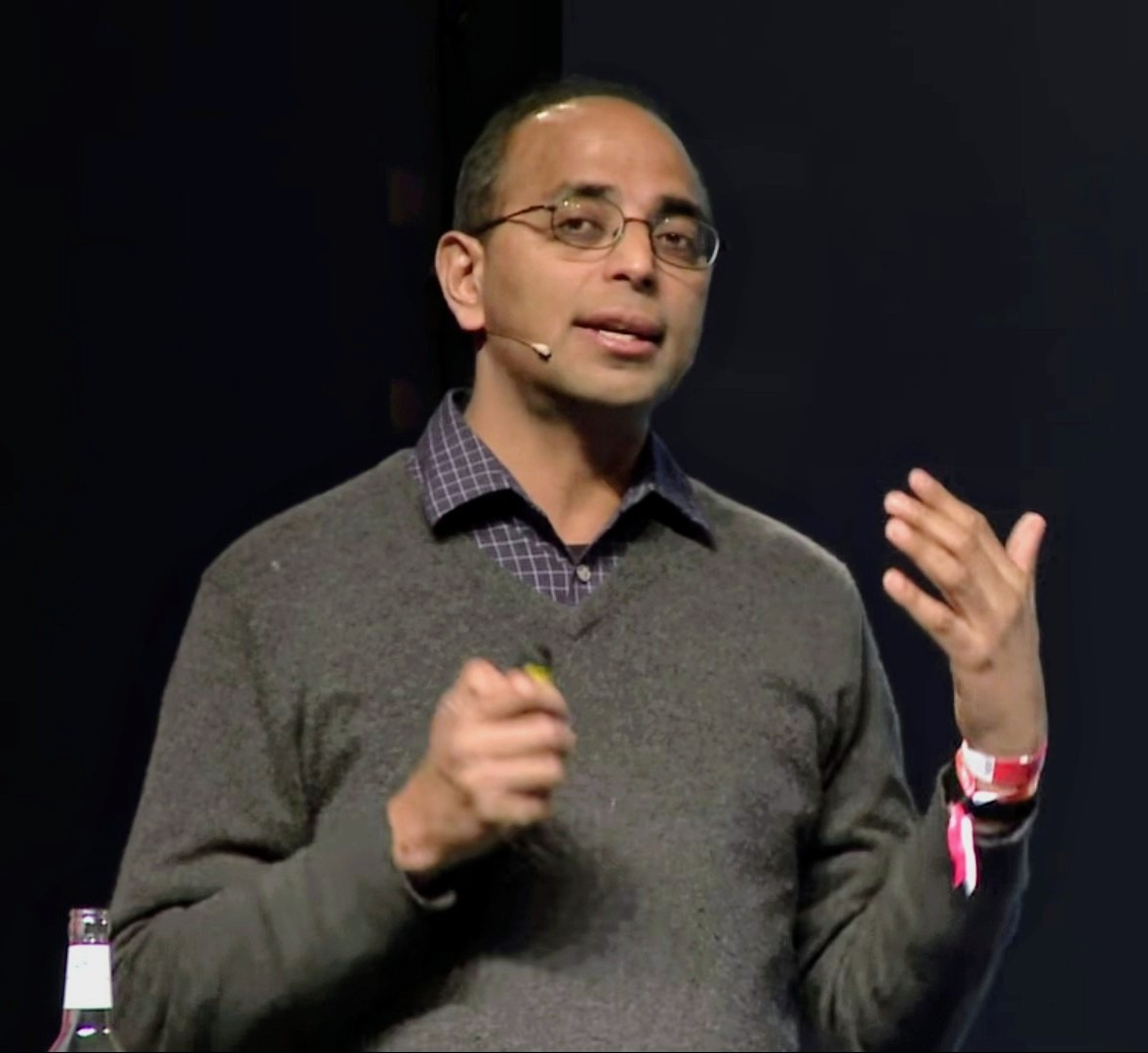
- Citizenship: Great Britain
- Occupation: Investigative journalist

Pratap Chatterjee (born Birmingham, United Kingdom) is an Indian/Sri Lankan investigative journalist and progressive author. He is a British citizen and grew up in India, although he lived in California for many years. He serves as the executive director of CorpWatch, an Oakland-based corporate accountability organisation. He also works for the Bureau of Investigative Journalism in London. He writes regularly for The Guardian and serves on the board of Amnesty International USA and of the Corporate Europe Observatory

Previously he was a producer and radio host at KPFA-FM in Berkeley, California, and a visiting fellow at the Center for American Progress Chatterjee has also served as a community advisor to KQED, the San Francisco public radio and television station. He was a member of the board of the Asian Pacific Environmental Network from 2001 to 2005, and was an Environmental Commissioner for the city of Berkeley from 1998 to 2003.

== Publications ==
His first book was a critique of the 1992 Earth Summit in Rio de Janeiro, written with Matthias Finger, titled The Earth Brokers: Power, Politics and World Development (Routledge Books, 1994) that analyses the United Nations response to global environmental crises.

In the late 1990s, Chatterjee did a great deal of research surrounding the 1849 California Gold Rush and how it affected Californian indigenous Americans which resulted in a booklet titled Gold, Greed & Genocide, which he later turned into a DVD with a 16-page classroom activities and discussion guide distributed by Oyate.

Chatterjee has travelled extensively in Central Asia and the Middle East to investigate the role of private military contractors working in Afghanistan and Iraq. In 2004, Chatterjee published the well-received Iraq, Inc.: A Profitable Occupation (Seven Stories Press). His footage was used in Michael Moore's 2004 film Fahrenheit 9-11 and he was interviewed in Robert Greenwald's film Iraq for Sale: The War Profiteers

In February 2009, Chatterjee published a detailed history of the role of Texas companies Halliburton and KBR titled Halliburton's Army: How A Well-Connected Texas Oil Company Revolutionized The Way America Makes War (Nation Books). In March 2009, he published several videos and an article of the failure of development aid in rural Afghanistan that was circulated via TomDispatch and on Salon. He followed this up with an article on the poor treatment of Afghan translators working under contract with Ohio-based Mission Essential Personnel for the US military.

In 2017, Chatterjee published Verax: The True History of Whistleblowers, Drone Warfare, and Mass Surveillance in collaboration with graphic novelist Khalil Bendib. It chronicles his own pursuits and the pursuits of other journalists to expose government mass surveillance and the flaws in the United States' drone warfare program. The piece is focused primarily around the story of Edward Snowden and the beginning of WikiLeaks. But, alongside this narrative, the book breaks down how mass surveillance works in layman's terms, reveals the industry of spyware and surveillance conventions, and explores the stories of those most effected by the drone warfare resulting from these surveillance programs.

He has been published in a number of popular media, including the Financial Times, The New Republic, The Guardian, and The Independent. He often appears as a guest expert in a wide variety of media ranging from Fox TV to Democracy Now!. His writing has won a number of awards, from the National Newspaper Association and Project Censored, among others.
