= Jane Perlez =

American journalist

- Education: University of Sydney (BA)
- Occupation: Journalist
- Organization: The New York Times
- Known for: Coverage of China
- Awards: Pulitzer Prize

Jane Perlez is a journalist. She was a long-time foreign correspondent for The New York Times. She won the Pulitzer Prize in 2009 for her coverage of the war against the Taliban and al-Qaeda in Pakistan and Afghanistan, a lead member of the group of NYT reporters included in the prize for international reporting that year. She served as Beijing Bureau Chief in China from 2012–2019, where she wrote about China's role in the world, and the competition between the United States and China, particularly in Asia.

As tensions increased between the USA and China in their struggle for global dominance and influence, Perlez created and hosts the award-winning podcast Face-Off: US vs China. It is supported by the Carnegie Corporation and is produced by the Belfer Center at the Harvard Kennedy School. Noted China historian, Rana Mitter appears in every episode. The podcast covers China's leader Xi Jinping; nuclear competition; AI; women in China; Taiwan; TikTok; spy craft; Western journalists in China and other topics on top of the agenda. In May 2025, Face Off won a prestigious Gracie Award, a prize dedicated to women in media. Face Off is Perlez's third podcast series on China. The others are: On the Trail of Xi Jinping, about how the US got Xi Jinping wrong; and The Great Wager, about President Nixon's 1972 trip to China and the following years as China gradually opened up to the West. In that podcast, Perlez broke the news that China's leader Deng Xiaoping visited CIA headquarters during his 1979 trip to Washington, DC.

== Early life and education ==
Born in London, Perlez grew up in Australia and graduated from the University of Sydney. In 1967, she traveled to China with a group of Australian students who went for a vacation but ended up spending three weeks in the middle of the Cultural Revolution. She got her first taste of the United States during an American Field Service scholarship in the mid-60s, and after three years in her first journalism job - at The Australian newspaper - she left Australia for New York in 1972. There she joined The New York Post to cover politics, leaving when Rupert Murdoch bought the newspaper in 1977. She worked briefly at the SoHo Weekly News, writing a media and political column, and then for a year-long stint, joined The New York Daily News. She began her career at The New York Times in 1981.

== Career ==
At the start of her career as a foreign correspondent, Perlez was a Pulitzer finalist for coverage of the famine in Somalia and the dispatch of American forces.

Perlez served as bureau chief in Nairobi, Kenya from 1988 to 1992 when civil wars were raging in Sudan, Ethiopia and Somalia. In 1993, she became bureau chief in Warsaw, Poland, writing about the emergence of Central Europe from the grip of the Cold War. In 1996, she moved to Vienna, a base for covering the Serbian leader, Slobodan Milosevic, and his aggression against Kosovo. As Chief Diplomatic Correspondent based in Washington, Perlez traveled with Secretary of State, Madeleine K. Albright, to Asia, Europe and Africa, and covered Secretary Colin Powell during his first year in the job. In 2002, she moved to Jakarta, Indonesia, where she first noted the rise of China and its impact on Southeast Asia, a series of articles that were among the first to document China's increasing influence in the region. For a series of articles on gold mining in Indonesia and in Peru, and the deleterious impact of the mining on local communities, she won the Overseas Press Club award for environmental reporting.

During four years based in Islamabad, Pakistan, Perlez wrote about the rising tensions between the United States and Pakistan, and the deep underlying differences between the two countries that were officially allies in the war on terror. Her articles included reporting on the Inter Services Intelligence and the Pakistani army, as well as on the Taliban, and their ability to strike at the core of Pakistan's institutions. Several articles highlighted the involvement of the Pakistani army and intelligence service in extrajudicial killings, including the murder of a Pakistani journalist in 2011. During her seven years in Beijing, Perlez covered Xi Jinping's growing power at home and abroad. Her stories for the New York Times included coverage of Xi's visit to the United States in 2015; his creation of the Belt and Road Initiative; the program Made in China 2025; and Asia Infrastructure and Investment Bank. She hosted a podcast about Xi's rise for the Shorenstein Center at Harvard University. In 2022, she hosted a podcast series titled The Great Wager, about how Richard Nixon and Henry Kissinger made friends with China in 1972, and how that relationship fell apart. The podcast would also air on NPR's Here and Now in February.

== Publications ==
- When America and China Collided, Foreign Affairs, July 5, 2024
