= Robert Greenwald =

American filmmaker

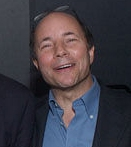
- Born: August 28, 1945 (age 81); New York City, U.S.
- Occupation: Film director
- Spouses: Heidi Frey; Nancy Greenwald (divorced)
- Children: Rachel Greenwald; Leah Greenwald; Noah Greenwald; Maya Greenwald
- Father: Harold Greenwald
- Relatives: Michael Kidd (uncle)

Robert Greenwald (born August 28, 1945) is an American filmmaker, and the founder of Brave New Films, a nonprofit film and advocacy organization whose work is distributed for free in concert with nonprofit partners and movements in order to educate and mobilize for progressive causes. With Brave New Films, Greenwald has made investigative documentaries such as Uncovered: The War on Iraq (2004), Outfoxed: Rupert Murdoch's War on Journalism (2004), Wal-Mart: The High Cost of Low Price (2005), Iraq for Sale: The War Profiteers (2006), Rethink Afghanistan (2009), Koch Brothers Exposed (2012), and War on Whistleblowers (2013), Suppressed 2020: The Fight to Vote (2020), Suppressed and Sabotaged: The Fight to Vote (2022), Suppressed and Sabotaged: The Fight to Vote (2024), Beyond Bars (2023), as well as many short investigative films and internet videos.

Before launching Brave New Films in 2000, Greenwald produced and/or directed more than 65 TV movies, miniseries, and films as well as major theatrical releases. His early body of work includes Steal This Movie! (2000), starring Vincent D'Onofrio as 60s radical Abbie Hoffman; Breaking Up (1997), starring Russell Crowe and Salma Hayek; A Woman of Independent Means (1995) with Sally Field; The Burning Bed (1984) with Farrah Fawcett; and Xanadu (1980), for which he won the inaugural Golden Raspberry Award for Worst Director.

Greenwald has earned 25 Emmy Award nominations, two Golden Globe nominations, the Peabody Award and the Robert Wood Johnson Award. He was awarded the 2002 Producer of the Year Award by the American Film Institute.

== Early life ==
Robert Greenwald was born and raised in New York City. He is son of the prominent psychotherapist Harold Greenwald, and the nephew of choreographer Michael Kidd. He attended the city's High School of Performing Arts. Greenwald started his directing career in the theater, with The People Vs. Ranchman (1968), A Long Time Coming and A Long Time Gone (1971), Me and Bessie (1975) and I Have a Dream (1976), a play based on the life of Martin Luther King Jr., with Billy Dee Williams playing King.

== Television and feature film career ==
Greenwald moved to Los Angeles in 1972, where he continued working as a theater director at the Mark Taper Forum. He later launched a career as a director for television, establishing first Moonlight Productions with partner Frank von Zerneck and theater producer Jack Schlissel and then Robert Greenwald Productions (RGP), and began creating theatrical films, television movies, miniseries and documentaries with a distinct social and political sensibility. Moonlight Productions was responsible for 34 films, and RGP has brought more than 45 films to audiences worldwide. In 1977, Greenwald received his first of three Emmy Award nominations for producing the television movie 21 Hours at Munich about the massacre at the 1972 Olympics, which was nominated for the Primetime Emmy Award for Outstanding Television Movie at the 29th Primetime Emmy Awards. His next Emmy nomination came in 1984 at the 37th Primetime Emmy Awards where he was nominated for Outstanding Directing in a Limited Series or a Special for directing The Burning Bed, one of the most-watched television movies of all time. Based on a true story, The Burning Bed has been credited as "a turning point in the fight against domestic violence." Greenwald also directed theatrical films such as Xanadu (1980), Sweet Hearts Dance (1988), Breaking Up (1997), and Steal This Movie! (2000).

Xanadu received mostly negative reviews. The film underperformed at the box office, grossing only $23 million against a reported $20 million budget, a total that was insufficient to offset all related costs and return a profit. A double feature of Xanadu and another musical released at about the same time, Can't Stop the Music directed by Nancy Walker, inspired John J. B. Wilson to create the Golden Raspberry Awards (or "Razzies"), an annual event "dishonoring" what is considered the worst in cinema for a given year. Xanadu won the first Razzie for Worst Director at the 1st Golden Raspberry Awards and was nominated for six other awards.

== Documentary work ==
Greenwald turned to documentary filmmaking in 2002, executive-producing three political documentaries known as "The Un Trilogy": Unprecedented: The 2000 Presidential Election (2002); Uncovered: The Whole Truth About The Iraq War (2003), which Greenwald also directed; and Unconstitutional: The War on Our Civil Liberties.

At Brave New Films, Greenwald has produced and directed numerous feature-length documentaries, along with many short films and videos. In 2013, Greenwald released War on Whistleblowers: Free Press and the National Security State and a documentary about the U.S. government's drone program, Unmanned: America's Drone Wars. His full-length feature documentary, Making a Killing: Guns, Greed, and the NRA (2015), illustrates the connection between gun industry profits and gun deaths in America.

Following the release of 16 Women and Donald Trump, which featured women who publicly accused President Trump of sexual misconduct, Greenwald hosted three of the accusers at a December, 2017 press conference in New York. In 2018, Greenwald created a short film to thank three Black women targeted by Donald Trump entitled, Thanks.

In 2019, Greenwald released Suppressed: The Fight to Vote about voter suppression in the 2018 Georgia election, in which Democrat Stacey Abrams narrowly lost to Republican Brian Kemp in the race for governor. Variety described the film as "scary and galvanizing" and said it demonstrated that "what happened in Georgia has implications that extend far beyond that race." The film was updated and released in April 2022 to expose voter suppression laws passed in 19 states across the United States. The 2022 film, entitled Suppressed and Sabotaged: The Fight to Vote features additional stories from voters in Florida, Arizona, and Texas. The updated version 2024 version of Suppressed and Sabotaged: The Fight to Vote highlights personal stories from Georgia voters during the controversial gubernatorial race between Stacey Abrams and Brian Kemp.

As coronavirus raged throughout the US in the summer of 2020, Greenwald's short film, Maddie’s Grandparents: A Preventable COVID Tragedy, about Maddie Kaji, a Florida teenager who turned her grief at losing both her grandparents to COVID-19 into activism, made national headlines, as did her response to President Donald Trump telling Americans not to let COVID “dominate” their lives. Greenwald also joined forces with American rock musician Tom Morello for No Justice No Peace, a short video about police violence that “spotlights the contrast between the racial injustice in the U.S. and the Trump administration's position on it” in honor of George Floyd.

In 2023, Greenwald and Brave New Films released Beyond Bars, an intimate look into the life of former San Francisco District Attorney Chesa Boudin. He has continued producing short films like E. Jean Carroll V. Donald J. Trump (2024) available for free to the public and starring Ellen Burstyn, Kathryn Hahn, Regina Taylor, and Lexi Underwood.

Greenwald released the documentary Gaza: Journalists Under Fire in 2025. Produced by Brave New Films, the documentary examines the lives of three Palestinian journalists killed by the Israeli army while covering the genocide in Gaza: Bilal Jadallah, Heba Al-Abadlah, and Ismail Al-Ghoul.

== Distribution and impact ==
Greenwald has applied the principles of guerrilla filmmaking at Brave New Films, using small budgets and short shooting schedules to produce political documentaries and then distributing them on DVDs and the Internet in affiliation with advocacy groups such as MoveOn. Brave New Film's methods are "rewriting the book on how movies are made and distributed." Greenwald's innovative model is said to be "working magnificently": "Millions of viewers have seen BNF films via grassroots 'house parties' and independent online DVD sales", as well as in more traditional theater screenings and online.

As a pioneer in alternative methods for effective progressive political campaigns, Greenwald has eschewed traditional distribution models of studio and network releases. He was among the first to post political online shorts and viral videos on YouTube and elsewhere on the internet, as well as releasing full-length documentaries online in a series of “real time” chapters. Greenwald's group takes full advantage of a variety of media outlets, such as Facebook and Twitter, and harnesses new distribution channels as soon as they emerge. A 2019 profile described the approach as a "marketing alchemy of feeds, hashtags, likes, favorites, hearts, @s, memes, soundbites and video clips, all edited, spliced and calibrated to grab attention in a hyperspeed world."

This approach has "inspired hundreds of thousands of people to take action and forced pressing issues into the mainstream media." He has been called "one of the most prominent and influential voices in new media." According to a Brave New Films website, as of 2013 its documentaries "have been streamed across all 7 continents and have been viewed over 70 million times."

== Politics ==
Various sources have described Greenwald's political activism as left-wing.

Greenwald has lectured at Harvard University for the Nieman Foundation for Journalism and speaks frequently across the country about his work. He addressed the United States House Appropriations Subcommittee on Defense regarding war profiteering on May 10, 2007. In 2013, Greenwald went to Capitol Hill once again, to discuss weaponized unmanned aerial vehicles with lawmakers. At a Congressional briefing, Greenwald testified with the Rafiq Rehman family, the first Pakistani drone strike survivors to appear before Congress. Since May 2005, Greenwald has been a contributing blogger to The Huffington Post.

== Selected filmography ==
=== Feature-length documentaries ===
- Uncovered: The War on Iraq (2004) (director/producer)
- Outfoxed: Rupert Murdoch's War on Journalism (2004) (director/producer)
- Wal-Mart: The High Cost of Low Price (2005) (director/producer)
- Iraq for Sale: The War Profiteers (2006) (director/producer)
- Rethink Afghanistan (2009) (director)
- Koch Brothers Exposed (2012) (director/producer);re-cut in 2014
- War on Whistleblowers: Free Press and the National Security State (2013) (director/producer)
- Unmanned: America's Drone Wars (2013) (director/producer)
- Making a Killing: Guns, Greed, and the NRA (2015) (director/producer)
- Suppressed: The Fight to Vote (2019) (director/producer)
- Suppressed: 2020 The Fight to Vote (2019) (director/producer)
- Beyond Bars (2023)
- Suppressed and Sabotaged: The Fight to Vote (2024)
- Gaza: Journalists Under Fire (2025)

=== Features and television movies ===
- 21 Hours at Munich (1976) (producer)
- Flatbed Annie & Sweetiepie: Lady Truckers (1979) (director)
- Xanadu (1980) (director)
- The Burning Bed (1984) (director)
- Shattered Spirits (1986) (director)
- Sweet Hearts Dance (1988) (director)
- She Says She's Innocent, aka Violation of Trust (executive producer)
- Hear No Evil (1993) (director/producer)
- Breaking Up (1997) (director/producer)
- Steal This Movie! (2000) (director/producer)
- The Crooked E: The Unshredded Truth About Enron (2003) (producer)

=== Documentary shorts ===
- Unprecedented: The 2000 Presidential Election (2002) (executive producer)
- Unconstitutional: The War on Our Civil Liberties (2004) (executive producer)
- The Big Buy: Tom DeLay's Stolen Congress (2006) (producer)
- The REAL Rudy (2007) (director)
- Fox Attacks: Black America (2007) (director/producer)
- Fox Attacks: Obama (2007) (director/producer)
- Fox Attacks: Iran (2007) (director/producer)
- Fox Attacks: Decency (2007) (director)
- Fox Attacks: The Environment (2007) (director)
- The Real McCain (2007) (director/producer)
- Sick for Profit (2009) (director)
- 16 Women and Donald Trump (2017) (director/producer)
- Healing Trauma: Beyond Gangs and Prisons (2018) (director/producer)

== Awards and honors ==
Greenwald's work has earned 25 Emmy Award nominations, two Golden Globe nominations, the Peabody Award and the Robert Wood Johnson Award. He was awarded the 2002 Producer of the Year Award by the American Film Institute. He has been honored for his investigative film work by the ACLU Foundation of Southern California; the Liberty Hill Foundation; the Los Angeles chapter of the National Lawyers Guild; Physicians for Social Responsibility; Consumer Attorney's Association of Los Angeles; Los Angeles Alliance for a New Economy and the Office of the Americas.

Nominations and awards for Greenwald's films:

- 25 Emmy Award nominations
- 4 Cable ACE Award nominations
- 2 Golden Globe nominations
- 2 DGA Nominations (1978 and 1985)
- 8 Awards of Excellence from the Film Advisory Board.
- Directors Guild of America Award, for Outstanding Directorial Achievement in Dramatic Specials for The Burning Bed, 1984.
- The Robert Wood Johnson Foundation for Excellence in Health and Medical Programming, for Sharing the Secret, 2000.
- The Peabody Award, for Sharing the Secret, 2000.
- The Robert Wood Johnson Foundation Prism Commendation for Blonde, 2002.
- Producer of the Year Award by the American Film Institute, 2002.
- Literacy in Media Award, for The Book of Ruth, 2004.
- Laurel Award, for Outfoxed, 2008.
- Telly Award, (Bronze), for This Brave Nation, 2009.
- Media for a Just Society, Finalist for Law and Disorder, 2013.

Awards for Robert Greenwald's activism:

- California Nurses Association, "Public Voice for Political Activism."
- Maggie Award from Planned Parenthood Federation.
- Office of the Americas,
- The Christopher Award, 1981 (for media that “affirm the highest values of the human spirit")
- ACLU of Southern California, Garden Party Award, 2003 and 2013.
- Physicians for Social Responsibility Los Angeles, Peacemaker Award, 2003
- The Los Angeles Chapter of the National Lawyers Guild Honors Robert Greenwald as "A Producer and Director who uses his talent and artistry to promote better understanding between people and advance the cause of peace, justice and freedom." - June 8, 2003;
- Rage for Justice, Citizen Activist of the Year, 2004.
- Los Angeles Alliance for a New Economy (LAANE)’s City of Justice Award 2005.
- Liberty Hill Foundation's Upton Sinclair Award, 2006.
- Norman Felton and Denise Aubuchon Humanitarian Award, 2007
- Courage in Media (California) Award, 2008 and 2010
