= Richard Ray Perez =

American documentary filmmaker and producer

Richard Ray Pérez, also known professionally as Rick Pérez, is an American documentary filmmaker, producer, story strategist, and educator. He directed and executive produced the feature documentary Cesar's Last Fast, which premiered at the 2014 Sundance Film Festival. He also directed Unprecedented: The 2000 Presidential Election, a political documentary.

Pérez has held programming and leadership positions at documentary film organizations, including Director of Creative Partnerships at the Sundance Institute, and Executive Director at the International Documentary Association.

Pérez joined Arizona State University's Sidney Poitier New American Film School, where he teaches undergraduate film courses.

Pérez is a cum laude graduate of Harvard University in visual and environmental studies. He is a native of San Fernando, California.
