= Winslow T. Wheeler =

Winslow T. Wheeler is the Director of the Straus Military Reform Project of the Project On Government Oversight in the Washington, D.C. area. After 31 years of service in the US Senate and the Government Accountability Office (GAO), he has written and edited several books about national security and the US military.

== Life ==
Wheeler was a national security advisor for the United States Senate and for the GAO between 1971 and 2002. Senators he was on the staff of include: Jacob K. Javits (R, NY), Nancy Landon Kassebaum (R, KS), David Pryor (D, AR), and Pete Domenici (R, NM). According to Wheeler, Senate records show that he was the first and last staffer "to work simultaneously on the personal staffs of a Republican and a Democrat (Pryor and Kassebaum)."

While working for the legislature, Wheeler was involved in the passage of the War Powers Act, Pentagon reform legislation, foreign policy, defense budget oversight. During his tenure with the GAO, he worked on studies of the air campaign during the 1991 Gulf War, the nuclear triad, and weapons testing. He claims these studies "found prevailing conventional wisdom about weapons to be badly misinformed."

Wheeler's career as a staffer in the Senate came to an end when in 2002, while working for the Budget Committee, he penned an essay under the pseudonym "Spartacus" criticizing pork-barrel spending by congress in the aftermath of the September 11 terrorist attacks. ("Mr. Smith Is Dead: No One Stands in the Way as Congress Lards Post-September 11 Defense Bills with Pork"). Wheeler claims that in response to criticism from senators, he resigned his position.

After his career as a staffer, he has appeared on TV and radio, written articles, commentaries and books, about national defense and military affairs. Appearances include “60 Minutes,” C-SPAN's “Book Notes” and “Q & A,” National Public Radio, the PBS NewsHour, The Washington Post, Politico, Mother Jones, Barron's, Defense News, and Armed Forces Journal.

He is married; they have two sons.

== Works ==
- The Wastrels of Defense: How Congress Sabotages U.S. Security, U.S. Naval Institute Press, October 2004, ISBN 978-1-59114-938-5
- Military Reform: An Uneven History and an Uncertain Future (Stanford University Press).
- America’s Defense Meltdown: Military Reform for President Obama and the New Congress
- "The Pentagon Labyrinth: 10 Short Essays to Help You Through It"
