= Rudy Giuliani: Urban Legend =

2007 video

Rudy Giuliani: Urban Legend is a video produced by the International Association of Firefighters (IAFF). On July 11, 2007, the IAFF released the 13-minute video in DVD format to fire departments across the U.S. The DVD outlines its complaints against Rudy Giuliani. It is critical of the 2008 Republican Party presidential candidate and former New York City mayor. As the video has been issued on a website, and not just DVD, it is classifiable as a viral video.

== Synopsis ==
The video is mainly concerned with criticizing Mayor Giuliani for alleged negligence in failing to properly replace faulty radios. The interviewees assert that the faulty radios prevented an evacuation order from reaching the some 300 firefighters who were in the Twin Towers of the World Trade Center immediately prior to their collapse. They note that there were unresolved problems with radios dating back to incidents in the early 1990s, including the first attack on the World Trade Center, the bombing in 1993.

The video rebroadcasts images of the collapsing Twin Towers. In the video, New York City Uniformed Firefighters Association president Stephen Cassidy said, "The things that we needed to do our jobs even better, we didn't have, because of his administration." He added, "On the heroic memory of 343 dead firefighters, he wants to run for president of the United States. It's a disgrace." Deputy Chief Jim Riches added, “We have the remains of dead heroes at the garbage dump because of Giuliani and his administration and they’re still there today and they won’t remove them." [This statement refers to the dump at the Fresh Kills Landfill on Staten Island.

Interviewees also criticize mayor Giuliani for terminating the search for buried firefighters and other first responders after the recovery of gold at the Ground Zero site, or "pile."

== Interviewees ==
Interviewees include several present and former IAFF leaders and firefighters from New York City, along with surviving relatives of firefighters that perished in the collapsed Twin Towers:

- IAFF President Harold A. Schaitberger
- Deputy Chief Jim Riches, FDNY
- Rosaleen Tallon, sister of Sean Patrick Tallon, FDNY
- Al Regenhard, Detective Sergeant, NYPD (ret.), husband of Sally Regenhard, father of Christian Regenhard
- Alexander Santora, Chief of Safety, FDNY (ret.)
- Steve Cassidy, President UFA Local 94, FDNY
- Jack McDonnell, President, UFOA Local 854, FDNY
- Eddie Brown, UFA Local 94, FDNY
- Pete Gorman, Former President, UFOA Local 854, FDNY

== See also ==
- Collapse of the World Trade Center
- Rescue and recovery effort after the September 11, 2001 attacks
- September 11, 2001 radio communications
