= Unconstitutional: The War on Our Civil Liberties =

- Directed by: Nonny de la Peña
- Written by: Nonny de la Peña
- Produced by: Nonny de la Peña; Robert Greenwald (Executive Producer); Earl Katz (Executive Producer)
- Narrated by: James Hanes
- Cinematography: Bestor Cram; Jennifer Lane
- Edited by: Joe Bini; Greg Byers
- Music by: Michael Brook
- Distributed by: Public Interest Pictures
- Release date: October 5, 2004
- Running time: 66 minutes
- Country: United States
- Language: English

Unconstitutional: The War on Our Civil Liberties is an American 2004 political documentary about the legal problems with the PATRIOT Act. It posits that the law, hastily passed in the wake of the 9/11 attacks, is used to justify a variety of abuses of civil rights that are guaranteed by the US Constitution.

This third and final film in the Un-trilogy from Executive Producer Robert Greenwald and Earl Katz, is a Public Interest Pictures Film. Unconstitutional was written, produced and directed by Nonny de la Peña.

== Synopsis ==
A few weeks after the September 11 attacks in 2001, the United States Congress passed a complicated and controversial law purportedly designed to help with tracking future terrorist threats. Unconstitutional's purpose is to explain the USA PATRIOT Act to its viewers and expose its alleged failings.

Primary among these is the way in which post-9/11 law enforcement detained Muslims and others with Arabic names for unspecified lengths of time without due process or criminal charges. As examples of this, Unconstitutional presents the stories of Safouh Mamoui, a Syrian living in Seattle, who was arrested without charges and imprisoned for ten months after the FBI cleared him of suspicion; Jose Padilla, a US citizen and Muslim convert, who was arrested as a “material witness” in the 9-11 attacks, and later designated an “enemy combatant” so he could be kept behind bars by the military in the absence of evidence or charges; and Aquil Adbullah, an American Catholic Olympic athlete who was put on the no-fly list as a result of his Arabic name. The film claims at least 1000 lesser-known people have been similarly abused. It also addresses the situation of prisoners in Guantanamo Bay and Abu Ghraib.

De la Pena also looks into other PATRIOT Act violations of civil liberties. Among these are government access to any citizen’s library records or email and FBI “sneak and peek” search and seizure of private property.

Unconstitutional suggests that American citizens might find themselves affected by the PATRIOT Act, even without any connection to terrorist activity. Law professor David Cole also points out that “when we treat others like this in the name of fighting a war... others fighting us can treat our soldiers like this.”

The film makes its arguments through civil liberties advocates, Republican lawmakers, Democratic politicians, bi-partisan lawyers, and some of the individuals who have been impacted by this law.

== Reception ==
Though Unconstitutional presents information from both conservative and progressive interviewees, it has generally been characterized as possessing a left-leaning viewpoint. The film was a Washington Post “Editor’s Pick.” More sympathetic reviewers call it a “66-minute incitement to anger” that “sheds light on discrimination.”

== Participants ==
- Laura Murphy, Director - Washington Legislative Office, American Civil Liberties Union
- Rep. Peter A. DeFazio, (D) Oregon
- David D. Cole, Professor of Law, Georgetown University
- Former Rep. Robert Barr (R) Georgia
- Anthony Romero, Executive Director, American Civil Liberties Union
- Barbara Olshansky, Deputy Legal Director, Center for Constitutional Rights
- Vincent Cannistraro, Former CIA Director for Counter Terrorism and Operations Analysis
- The Hamoui Family - Sam Hamoui, Safouh Hamoui, Hanan Hamoui, Mohammed Hamoui, Nadin Hamoui & Rham Hamoui
- Kathy Culliton, Legislative Staff Attorney, Mexican American Legal Defense and Educational Fund
- Thomas B. Wilner, Attorney for Kuwaitee detainees
- Maj. Michael Mori, U.S. military lawyer appointed to Guantanamo detainee David Hicks
- Azmat Begg, father of Guatanamo Bay detainee Moazzam Begg
- Donna Newman, Attorney for Jose Padilla
- Anne Turner, Librarian, Santa Cruz Public Library
- Ryan Coonerty, bookstore owner
- Douglas Heller, Executive Director, Foundation for Taxpayer and Consumer Rights
- Mara Verheyden-Hilliard, Partnership for Civil Justice Fund
- David Lindorff, investigative reporter and author of This can't be happening
- Jayashri Srikantian, American Civil Liberties Union
- Andrew O'Connor, former public defender
- A.J. Brown, student
- Ken Kurtis, owner, Reefseekers
- Dave Meserve, Arcata City council member
