= De-Trumpification =

Proposed initiative to reform democracy in the United States

De-Trumpification, also known as "demagafication", is a proposed policy strategy of democratic reform in the United States based on the wide ranging impact made by the first and second presidencies of Donald Trump. De-Trumpification seeks to reverse the changes made by two non-consecutive Trump administrations and to prevent such changes from occurring in the future with a new set of modern guardrails based on strong ethical and legal reforms.

Proposals for post-Trump institutional reconstruction range from restoring institutions and rebuilding democratic norms to new forms of accountability, including additional investigations, reports, prosecutions, and commissions. Other proposals include personnel and ethics reforms, as well as preventive measures designed to strengthen institutions that have been weakened. The idea of purging, such as demagafication, remains largely theoretical, as there is no consensus on whether a form of transitional justice is necessary or whether such measures could operate effectively within the existing framework of American governance.

Furthermore, the efficacy of previous efforts, such as denazification in Germany and de-Ba'athification in Iraq, show a wide range of results that historians are still debating. Additionally, more recent efforts by the Biden administration to enact similar reforms in response to the first Trump administration were characterized by the Campaign Legal Center as largely ineffective.

== Background ==
In the past, democratic societies, in contrast to autocratic ones, generally choose not to punish political leaders involved in former authoritarian regimes or in countries emerging from democratic backsliding. According to work by political scientist Erica Frantz, these types of leaders often escape punishment 59% of the time. Various experts are divided on the correct and appropriate approach to take, with some arguing that democratic societies should avoid prosecuting their opponents. Some countries have used different models to recognize and record the mistakes made by undemocratic regimes. South Africa, for example, used the restorative justice model to hold a Truth and Reconciliation Commission to address the previous system of apartheid in their society.

German philosopher and historian Jan-Werner Müller argues that in spite of those who say free societies should uphold democratic norms by refraining from prosecuting the opposition party, "there is no reason, in principle, why a political leader cannot be properly punished for a crime he has committed". Müller and others propose the creation of separate commissions to investigate actions taken by the Trump administration, such as allegations of corruption and human rights violations, as well as another commission to study the weaknesses and shortcomings of the presidency itself, leading to a new codification of norms as a means of reform.

Müller observes a similar approach was taken after the Watergate scandal involving President Richard Nixon, with new laws created and accepted by both parties in the wake of the controversy. Nevertheless, an opposing pattern of inaction by governments in the past also comes to light. In this regard, Müller cites the failure to prosecute Nixon by the Ford administration, the failure to prosecute those involved in the Iran-Contra affair by the Reagan administration, and the failure to address the use of torture during the Global War on Terrorism in the Bush administration.

== Definition ==
De-Trumpification, also known as de-MAGA-fication, deMAGAfication, demagafication, or detrumpification, is a political neologism that proposes a policy strategy of democratic reform in the United States. It suggests that MAGA ideology and its associated policies need to be reformed, and using peaceful democratic means, the people who uphold these ideas need to be removed from positions of authority in the government of the United States. The use of the term refers to the post-World War II initiative of denazification which dismantled Nazi beliefs and removed Nazi ideologues from German society.

== Proposals ==
=== First Trump administration ===
During the first Trump presidency, Michelle Goldberg, op-ed columnist for The New York Times, proposed what she called the "de-Trumpification agenda" in early 2018. In her article, Goldberg reported on the trail of political corruption and self-dealing up to that point coming from the White House. Goldberg predicted that a time for accountability may eventually come in the future. "If we expect America to ever again be more than a squalid kleptocracy, we're going to need a comprehensive plan of de-Trumpification, including wide-ranging investigations and legal reforms", she wrote. She then offered proposals for what such a plan would look like by Christine Todd Whitman, Preet Bharara, Norm Eisen, and Steven Levitsky.

In October 2019, approximately a year before the 2020 United States presidential election, the Joe Biden 2020 presidential campaign announced the "The Biden Plan To Guarantee Government Works For The People", an ethics and anti-corruption plan including a list of 25 policy proposals that promised to address the malfeasance of the Trump administration if Biden was elected.

Just several weeks before the January 6 United States Capitol attack, journalist Doyle McManus called on the need for the next president to focus on de-Trumpification, primarily due to Trump's interpretation of Article Two of the United States Constitution, which he believes gives him, in his own words, "the right to do whatever I want." McManus went on to list various reforms and proposals to address this problem, pointing to the work of Robert Bauer and Jack Goldsmith in their book After Trump: Reconstructing the Presidency (2020), and to congressional legislation under discussion in 2020.

=== Biden administration ===
A week before the inauguration of Joe Biden, professor of law David Kaye, former UN Special Rapporteur on Freedom of Expression, published an op-ed outlining a basic proposal for de-Trumpification in the new Biden era. Kaye offered a three-part strategy for holding former Trump administration officials accountable: first, elite institutions should screen former Trump administration officials before appointing them to their ranks, such as in universities, think tanks, law firms, and corporations; second, journalists should scrutinize former Trump officials and not allow them to whitewash their roles in media coverage; and third, Kaye recommends that Congress investigate the abuses of power that have occurred.

In an assessment of Biden's first 100 days as president in 2021, political scientist and journalist David Rothkopf argued in an opinion piece that Biden had made significant progress in de-Trumpifying the country. He described Biden's pandemic response as his greatest achievement in this regard, but warned that much work needed to be done. In June, the Editorial Board of The Washington Post invoked de-Trumpification to respond to repeated violations against press freedom and government transparency by the first Trump administration. The Board asked the Biden administration to help protect the communication records of journalists and for it to investigate how the Justice Department under Trump allegedly spied on three journalists at The Post and one at CNN, and for going after the identities of Twitter users who criticized Trump's allies.

On January 10, 2025, the Campaign Legal Center's (CLC) Danielle Caputo argued that Biden fulfilled "only fulfilled three of the 25 [ethics] promises", leaving weak guardrails for Trump's second term.

=== Second Trump administration ===
In the second Trump presidency, cultural critic and educational scholar Eric J. Wiener and economist Paul Krugman expressed public support for "demagafication". Journalist Ryan Cooper proposed that demagafication focus on reforming social media sites first, beginning with cracking down on X (formerly Twitter), which Cooper views as a "central organizing hub" for fascists, followed by legal reforms to the U.S. court system, including the Supreme Court. Cooper also believes that MAGA tribunals are needed, followed by new democratic reforms, new voting rights laws, and a ban on gerrymandering.

Journalist Dan Froomkin believes the process will involve many different fronts and wide-ranging reforms, and has explored a roadmap for de-Trumpification based on leading proposals by policy experts. These proposals range from passing legislation that would give people a clear legal right to sue federal government officials when those same officials violate their constitutional rights, to the adoption of proportional representation, data privacy and government surveillance reform, National Security Council reform, the enforcement of the separation of powers, and grand jury reform, among many others.

== Reaction ==
Legal journalist Benjamin Wittes finds the question of demagafication interesting but says that, while there has been a lot of chatter, he has seen "almost no serious work done on the subject". Wittes is joined in this assessment by Scott R. Anderson of the Brookings Institution, who says it is a complex issue that is "strictly hypothetical", arguing that it may resolve itself in part if federal employees who were fired under the Trump administration are rehired under a new administration. Both Wittes and Anderson believe the topic will gain currency with the approach of the 2028 United States presidential election.

== See also ==
- Electoral and ethics policy of the Biden administration
- Executive Order 13989
- First presidency of Donald Trump
- Presidency of Joe Biden

== Sources ==
=== Journals ===
- Wiener, Eric J. (Summer 2024). "Critical Pedagogy, De-MAGA-fication, and the Struggle for Democratic Life" (PDF). Taboo: The Journal of Culture and Education. 22 (2): 112–127. ISSN 1080-5400.

=== Magazines ===
- Cooper, Ryan (9 June 2026). "Two Simple Steps Toward De-MAGAfication". The American Prospect.
- Ford, Matt (20 December 2025). "The Immanent Joy of Detrumpification". The New Republic.
- Rosenberg, Paul (1 August 2020). "On the de-Trumpification of America: It definitely won't be easy, but it must be done". Salon. Archived from the original on August 1, 2020.

=== News sites ===
- Bryant, Jacob (1 June 2026). "Columnist Attacked by Trump Calls for 'De-MAGAfication' of US: 'Similar to De-Nazification' of Germany". The Wrap.
- Froomkin, Dan (July 22, 2026). "What is the resistance governing agenda?". Heads Up News.
- Editorial Board (June 1, 2021). "The Trump administration's war on the truth must not repeat". The Washington Post.
- Goldberg, Michelle (February 23, 2018). "The De-Trumpification Agenda". The New York Times.
- Guyatt, Nicholas (11 August 2026). "The battle to 'de-Trumpify' America starts now". The i Paper.
- Kaye, David (14 January 2021). "De-Trumpification should start with elite institutions". The Los Angeles Times.
- Khalid, Asma (14 October 2019). "Biden Releases Government Ethics Plan". NPR. WXXI News.
- McManus, Doyle (8 December 2020). "Time to strengthen guardrails against unrestrained power". Honolulu Star-Advertiser. Los Angeles Times.
- Millhiser, Ian (31 July 2021). "Biden's fight to de-Trumpify the courts, explained". Vox.
- Moran, Lee (1 June 2026). "Paul Krugman Issues Dire Plea For 'DeMAGAfication' Of America After Trump". Huffington Post.
- Müller, Jan-Werner (5 November 2020). "Truth and De-Trumpification". Project Syndicate. Archived from the original on November 5, 2020.
- Rothkopf, David (3 May 2021). "Biden off to good start de-Trumpifying America". The Savannah Morning News. USA Today.
- Schwadron, Terry H. (6 May 2026). "A Generation of Restoration: Can America Repair What Trump Broke?". DCReport.
- Wittes, Benjamin; Anderson, Scott R (19 February 2026). "Ask Lawfare Anything: February 2026". Lawfare (Podcast).

=== Public policy institutes ===
- Caputo, Danielle (10 January 2025). "Biden's Failure to Advance Ethics Reform May Embolden Unethical Behavior in the Next Administration". Campaign Legal Center.
- Caputo, Danielle (30 November 2021). "Why Hasn't Biden Made Progress on Ethics Reform?". Campaign Legal Center.
- Feffer, John (26 June 2020). "The De-Trumpification of America". Foreign Policy in Focus. Institute for Policy Studies.
- Olohan, Mary Margaret (15 October 2019). "Meet the Bidens: Hunter Steps Down From Chinese Company, Joe Releases Anticorruption Plan". The National Interest.

=== Websites ===
- "Vice President Joe Biden Announces His Plan to Guarantee that Government Works for the People". Biden for President (Press release). 14 October 2019. Archived from the original on 2019-10-14.
- "Watergate-era reforms 50 years later". Harvard Law Today. Harvard Law School. 8 June 2022.
