= Kochland =

2019 book by Christopher Leonard about Koch Industries

Kochland: The Secret History of Koch Industries and Corporate Power in America
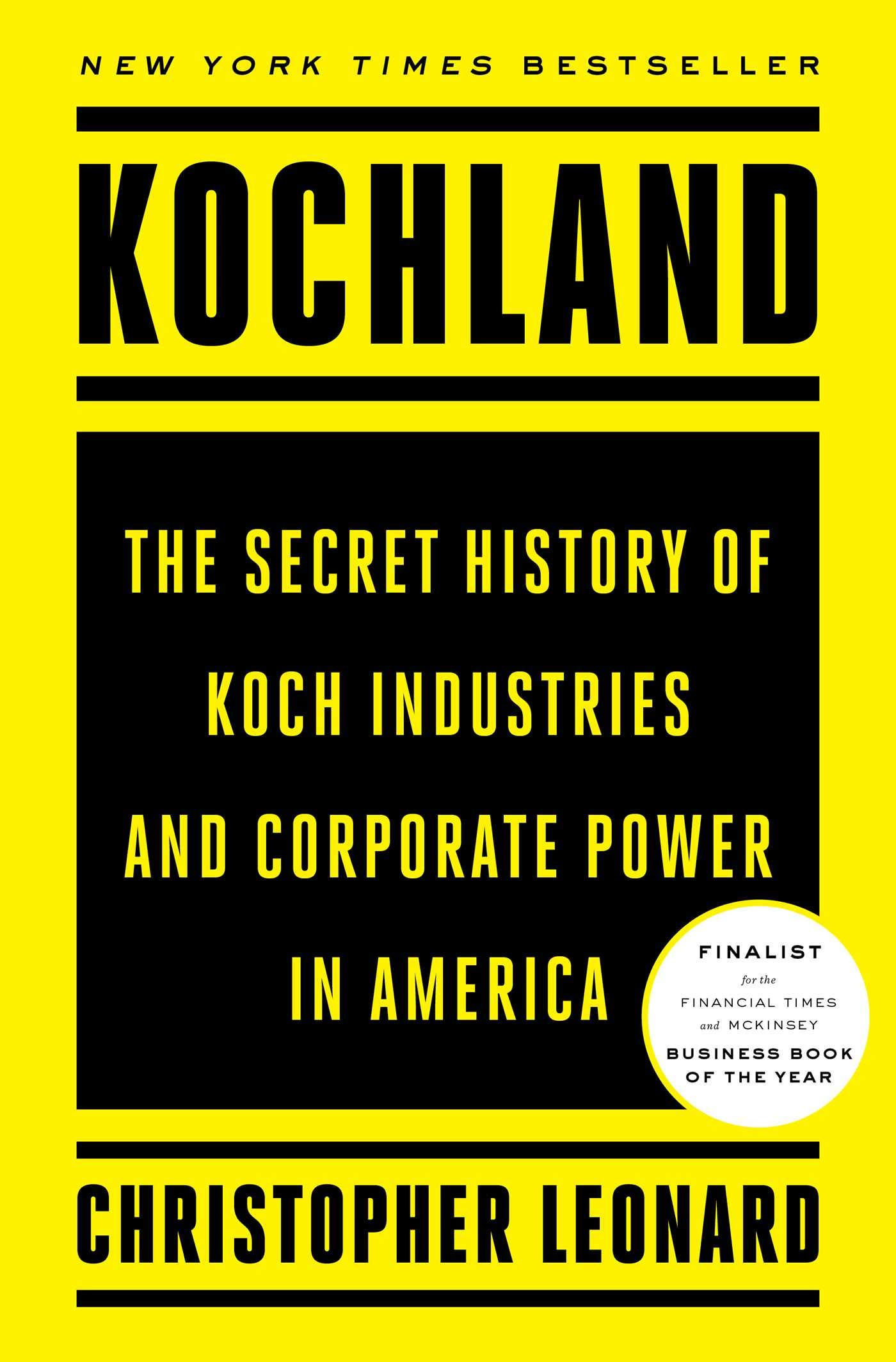
- Author: Christopher Leonard
- Genre: nonfiction
- Publisher: Simon & Schuster
- Publication date: 2019
- Pages: 704
- ISBN: 9781476775388
- Preceded by: The Meat Racket
- Website: Publisher's web page for the book

Kochland: The Secret History of Koch Industries and Corporate Power in America is a 2019 book by Christopher Leonard about account of how Koch Industries became one of the biggest private companies in the world.

== Overview ==
Leonard traces the history of Koch Industries from a regional pipeline company to a sprawling corporate entity with "a political-influence machine of rare scope". The first part of is devoted to the history of Koch Industries, beginning with Charles Koch's assumption of leadership after the death of his father Fred in 1967. It traces the corporate history through the 70s and 80s as Koch grows the company and structures it in such a way that its profits rely mostly on volatility within the petroleum industry (meaning Koch makes money when oil prices go down as well as up). Also detailed are Koch's extensive union-busting activities, a battle for control of the company between Charles Koch and his brothers, and the story of Koch's first major setback with the disastrous 1996 purchase of Purina Mills (which Koch sold after 5 turbulent years)

The second part focuses on Koch's diversification into the financial sector, as the company begins leveraging its extensive infrastructure and commodity holdings to take advantage of booming financial markets in the 1990s and 2000s. This section includes the first real comprehensive look at the astronomical profits Koch generated in the commodities markets, its purchase of Georgia-Pacific, and its participation in the events that created the 2000 California electricity crisis.

The final part of the book examines how Koch Industries many legal entanglements with government regulators and Charles Koch's own libertarian philosophies fueled the Koch's decades-long efforts to discredit climate change by creating one of the largest influence operation in existence.

== Critical reception ==
Kochland was widely praised upon its release. In The New Yorker, Jane Mayer described the book as a “deeply and authoritatively reported" work that "marshals a huge amount of information and uses it to help solve two enduring mysteries: how the Kochs got so rich, and how they used that fortune to buy off American action on climate change”. Bryan Burrough noted that "what's most impressive is its refreshing balance and evenhandedness. Leonard does not judge the Kochs; he explains them — their operations and acquisitions, successes and failures, trading strategies, business philosophies and family feuds'. Kochland was awarded the J. Anthony Lukas Work-in-Progress Award in 2017 and was a finalist for the Financial Times and McKinsey Business Book of the Year Award

== See also ==
- Dark Money (book)
- Koch Brothers Exposed
- Company Town (film)
- Citizen Koch
