= Jane Mayer bibliography =

List of works by or about Jane Mayer, American journalist.

== Books ==
- Mayer, Jane & Doyle McManus (1989). Landslide: The Unmaking of the President, 1984–1988. Houghton Mifflin.
- Mayer, Jane & Jill Abramson (1994). Strange Justice: The Selling of Clarence Thomas. Houghton Mifflin.
- Mayer, Jane (2008). The Dark Side: The Inside Story of How the War on Terror Turned Into a War on American Ideals. Doubleday.
- — (2017). Dark Money: The Hidden History of the Billionaires Behind the Rise of the Radical Right. Doubleday.

== Essays and reporting ==
- Mayer, Jane (September 22, 1997). "The Wayward Press". The New Yorker. 73 (28): 56.
- — (December 1, 1997). "Janet Reno, Alone". The Political Scene. The New Yorker. 73 (37): 40–45.
- — (February 2, 1998). "A Midwinter Night's Sex Comedy". The Talk of the Town. The New Yorker. 73 (45): 25–28.
- — (February 16, 1998). "Dept. of Snooping". The Talk of the Town. The New Yorker. 74 (1): 32.
- — (March 23, 1998). "Portrait of a Whistleblower". The Political Scene. The New Yorker. 74 (5): 34–47.
- — (May 11, 1998). "Dept. of Innovation". The Talk of the Town. The New Yorker. 74 (11): 37.
- — (June 8, 1998). "For the Record". Dept. of Amplification. The New Yorker. 74 (15): 34–36.
- — (August 10, 1998). "Ask Mr. Science". The Talk of the Town. The New Yorker. 74 (23): 27.
- — (August 10, 1998). "Dept. of Mentors". The Talk of the Town. The New Yorker. 74 (23): 25.
- — (August 24–30, 1998). "Silver Lining Dept". The Talk of the Town. The New Yorker. 74 (25): 50–52.
- — (September 7, 1998). "The Inside Scoop". The Talk of the Town. The New Yorker. 74 (26): 27–28.
- — (October 12, 1998). "The Couch". The Talk of the Town. The New Yorker. 74 (31): 30–31.
- — (November 30, 1998). "The Lover in Jail". The Political Scene. The New Yorker. 74 (37): 55–59.
- — (December 21, 1998). "Eye of the Storm Dept". The Talk of the Town. The New Yorker. 74 (39): 34.
- — (December 28, 1998). "Ink". The Talk of the Town. The New Yorker. 74 (40): 38–39.
- — (March 15, 1999). "Wind on Capitol Hill". The Talk of the Town. The New Yorker. 75 (3): 31–32.
- — (April 26, 1999). "Ink". The Talk of the Town. The New Yorker. 75 (9): 42.
- — (May 24, 1999). "The Exterminator". The Political Scene. The New Yorker. 75 (12): 32–41.
- — (June 7, 1999). "The Political Life". The Talk of the Town. The New Yorker. 75 (14): 30.
- — (June 21, 1999). "The Political Life". The Talk of the Town. The New Yorker. 75 (16): 68.
- — (July 5, 1999). "The Political Life". The Talk of the Town. The New Yorker. 75 (17): 25.
- — (August 9, 1999). "Dept. of Inquiring Minds". The Talk of the Town. The New Yorker. 75 (22): 26.
- — (September 27, 1999). "L.A. Postcard". The Talk of the Town. The New Yorker. 75 (28): 32–34.
- — (October 11, 1999). "Wind On Capitol Hill". The Talk of the Town. The New Yorker. 75 (30): 40–41.
- — (November 1, 1999). "Dept. of Helping Hands". The Talk of the Town. The New Yorker. 75 (32): 50.
- — (November 8, 1999). "Dept. of Aptitude (w/Alexandra Robbins)". The Talk of the Town. The New Yorker. 75 (33): 30–32.
- — (November 22, 1999). "The Anxiety of Influence (w/Joe Klein)". The Campaign Trail. The New Yorker. 75 (35): 70–80.
- — (December 6, 1999). "Wind on Capitol Hill". The Talk of the Town. The New Yorker. 75 (37): 54.
- — (January 31, 2000). "Strange Bedfellows Dept". The Talk of the Town. The New Yorker. 75 (44): 30.
- — (March 6, 2000). "Radical Chic Dept. The Heiress and the Anarchists". The Talk of the Town. The New Yorker. 76 (2): 32–34.
- — (March 27, 2000). "The Campaign Haley Barbour Under the Microscope". The Talk of the Town (The Campaign). The New Yorker. 76 (5): 36–39.
- — (April 24, 2000). "Brave New World Dept. Take Two, Leo!". The Talk of the Town. The New Yorker. 76 (9): 62.
- — (August 14, 2000). "Bad News". Annals of Journalism. The New Yorker. 76 (23): 30–36.
- — (October 2, 2000). "The Actors Studio Being George W. Bush". The Talk of the Town. The New Yorker. 76 (29): 56–58.
- — (November 20, 2000). "Dept. of Close Calls George W.'s Cousin". The Talk of the Town. The New Yorker. 76 (35): 36–38.
- — (December 11, 2000). "The Neverending Story Blame the Press!". The Talk of the Town. The New Yorker. 76 (38): 42–43.
- — (January 22, 2001). "Legacies A Clash of Republican Dynasties". The Talk of the Town. The New Yorker. 76 (43): 29.
- — (February 5, 2001). "Pardon Me Marc Rich's Friend in the Bush White House". The Talk of the Town. The New Yorker. 76 (45): 31–32.
- — (April 23, 2001). "Can Yale Bring Back Bush?". School Ties. The New Yorker.
- — (June 18, 2001). "The New King of Quotes". Wind on Capital Hill. The New Yorker.
- — (October 15, 2001). "Pat Leahy Recalls a Sting". The Hill. The New Yorker.
- — (November 12, 2001). "The House of bin Laden". The Political Scene. The New Yorker. 77 (35): 54–65.
- — (December 21, 2001). "Fallout at the Red Cross". Recriminations. The New Yorker.
- — (February 18, 2002). "The Sound of America". Dept. of Propaganda. The New Yorker.
- — (April 22, 2002). "The Accountant's War". The Political Scene. The New Yorker. 78 (9): 64–72.
- — (July 22, 2002). "Stalemate at the S.E.C." Business as Usual Dept. The New Yorker.
- — (August 5, 2002). "Oh, Behave". On the Hill. The New Yorker.
- — (September 2, 2002). "Drive Small". On the Air. The New Yorker.
- — (October 14, 2002). "A Doctrine Passes". The Big Idea. The New Yorker.
- — (October 28, 2002). "Saddam on the Couch". Early Wounds Dept. The New Yorker.
- — (March 10, 2003). "Lost in the Jihad". Annals of Justice. The New Yorker. 79 (3): 50–59.
- — (May 5, 2003). "The Contractors". Dept. of Corrections. The New Yorker.
- — (August 4, 2003). "The Search for Osama". Letter from Washington. The New Yorker. 79 (21): 26–34.
- — (September 22, 2003). "Explain This One". Dept. of Coincidence. The New Yorker.
- — (October 13, 2003). "The 'D' Word". The Campaign Trail. The New Yorker.
- — (February 16, 2004). "Contract Sport". Letter from Washington. The New Yorker.
- — (March 1, 2004). "The Guard Years". Old Flames. The New Yorker.
- — (June 7, 2004). "The Manipulator". A Reporter at Large. The New Yorker.
- — (July 12, 2004). "The Vice-President's Doctor". In the Beltway. The New Yorker.
- — (October 18, 2004). "The Money Man". A Reporter at Large. The New Yorker.
- — (February 14, 2005). "Outsourcing the Torture of Suspected Terrorists". Annals of Justice. The New Yorker.
- — (July 11, 2005). "The Experiment". A Reporter at Large. The New Yorker.
- — (September 19, 2005). "High Stakes". The Talk of the Town. Wind on Capitol Hill. The New Yorker.
- — (November 14, 2005). "A Deadly Interrogation". A Reporter at Large. The New Yorker.
- — (February 27, 2006). "The Memo". Annals of the Pentagon. The New Yorker.
- — (July 3, 2006). "The Hidden Power". Letter from Washington. The New Yorker.
- — (September 11, 2006). "Junior". Dept. of Law Enforcement. The New Yorker.
- — (October 30, 2006). "The C.I.A.'s Travel Agent". Outsourcing. The New Yorker.
- — (November 20, 2006). "A Congressman's Enigma". The Talk of the Town. Wind on Capitol Hill. The New Yorker.
- — (February 19, 2007). "The Politics of '24'". Letter from Hollywood. The New Yorker.
- — (March 26, 2007). "Bullets". The Talk of the Town. Wind on Capitol Hill. The New Yorker.
- — (August 13, 2007). "The Black Sites". A Reporter at Large. The New Yorker.
- — (October 27, 2008). "The Insiders". The Political Scene. The New Yorker.
- — (January 19, 2009). "Too Big to Fly". The New Yorker Blog. The New Yorker.
- — (January 25, 2009). "Behind the Executive Orders". The New Yorker Blog. The New Yorker.
- — (February 23, 2009). "The Hard Cases". A Reporter at Large. The New Yorker.
- — (February 26, 2009). "Al-Marri Indictment Today [UPDATED]". News Desk. The New Yorker.
- — (February 27, 2009). "Jane Mayer: More on the Al-Marri Indictment". News Desk. The New Yorker.
- — (March 5, 2009). "Jane Mayer: The Face of Ali Saleh Kahlah al-Marri". News Desk. The New Yorker.
- — (April 13, 2009). "The Bush Six". The Bench. The New Yorker.
- — (April 21, 2009). "Jane Mayer: Thoughts on the Levin Report". News Desk. The New Yorker.
- — (April 22, 2009). "Jane Mayer: Another Timing Gap in the Levin Torture Report". News Desk. The New Yorker.
- — (April 22, 2009). "Jane Mayer: Winning the War on Terror, One Bug at a Time". News Desk. The New Yorker.
- — (June 17, 2009). "Jane Mayer: C.I.A. Former Inspector General Pushed For Disclosure on Interrogations". News Desk. The New Yorker.
- — (June 22, 2009). "The Secret History". The Political Scene. The New Yorker.
- — (August 25, 2009). "Jane Mayer: Is Cheney a Switch-Hitter on Executive Power?". News Desk. The New Yorker.
- — (August 25, 2009). "Jane Mayer: Drilling Down". News Desk. The New Yorker.
- — (September 2, 2009). "Jane Mayer: Calling Hannah Arendt". News Desk. The New Yorker.
- — (October 26, 2009). "The Predator Drone War". The Political Scene. The New Yorker.
- — (October 29, 2009). "Jane Mayer: Predator Versus International Law?". News Desk. The New Yorker.
- — (November 4, 2009). "Jane Mayer: Italy Takes On the C.I.A." News Desk. The New Yorker.
- — (December 16, 2009). "Ten Unsolved Mysteries in the 'War on Terror'". News Desk. The New Yorker.
- — (February 15, 2010). "The Trial". A Reporter at Large. The New Yorker.
- — (March 29, 2010). "Counterfactual". Books. The New Yorker.
- — (March 31, 2010). "Who Killed Gul Rahman?". News Desk. The New Yorker.
- — (April 5, 2010). "Looking for a Body". News Desk. The New Yorker.
- — (August 30, 2010). "The Koch Brothers' Covert Operations". A Reporter at Large. The New Yorker.
- — (September 9, 2010). "State Secrets". News Desk. The New Yorker.
- — (September 27, 2010). "Back To the Seventies". The Talk of the Town. Wind on Capitol Hill. The New Yorker.
- — (October 19, 2010). "Virginia Thomas's Message for Anita Hill". News Desk. The New Yorker.
- — (January 29, 2011). "Who Is Omar Suleiman?". News Desk. The New Yorker.
- — (February 24, 2011). "Worrying About Reagan". News Desk. The New Yorker.
- — (April 4, 2011). "The K.S.M. Trial Decision". News Desk. The New Yorker.
- — (May 2, 2011). "Bin Laden Dead, Torture Debate Lives On". News Desk. The New Yorker.
- — (May 23, 2011). "Thomas Drake vs. the N.S.A." A Reporter at Large. The New Yorker.
- — (May 24, 2011). "James Risen's Subpoena". News Desk. The New Yorker.
- — (June 3, 2011). "Abramson and Anita Hill". News Desk. The New Yorker.
- — (June 9, 2011). "Is the N.S.A. Whistleblower Case Falling Apart?". News Desk. The New Yorker.
- — (June 9, 2011). "A Deal in the N.S.A. Case". News Desk. The New Yorker.
- — (October 4, 2011). "Art Pope and Attack Ads". News Desk. The New Yorker.
- — (October 10, 2011). "State for Sale". A Reporter at Large. The New Yorker.
- — (October 10, 2011). "Art Pope and Individualism". News Desk. The New Yorker.
- — (October 12, 2011). "A Sign in North Carolina?". News Desk. The New Yorker.
- — (October 20, 2011). "Herman Cain and the Kochs". News Desk. The New Yorker.
- — (November 4, 2011). "Cain and His Brothers". News Desk. The New Yorker.
- — (November 8, 2011). "Cain and Thomas". News Desk. The New Yorker.
- — (November 14, 2011). "Power walk". The Talk of the Town. Wind on Capitol Hill. The New Yorker. 87 (36): 26, 29.
- — (November 18, 2011). "Grover the Guest". News Desk. The New Yorker.
- — (November 28, 2011). "Taking It To the Streets". Comment. The New Yorker.
- — (December 15, 2011). "The Most Overhyped Political Stories of 2011". News Desk. The New Yorker.
- — (December 16, 2011). "Hitch". News Desk. The New Yorker.
- — (January 6, 2012). "The Gekko Institute Comes to Washington". News Desk. The New Yorker.
- — (February 8, 2012). "Leader of the PACs". News Desk. The New Yorker.
- — (February 10, 2012). "Première: Ry Cooder Sings About Willie Horton". News Desk. The New Yorker.
- — (February 13–20, 2012). "Attack dog". The Political Scene. The New Yorker. 88 (1): 40–49.
- — (February 15, 2012). "Who Let the Attack-Ad Dogs Out?". News Desk. The New Yorker.
- — (February 17, 2012). "Where's George?". News Desk. The New Yorker.
- — (March 1, 2012). "The Kochs vs. Cato". News Desk. The New Yorker.
- — (March 5, 2012). "Kochs vs. Cato, Round Two". News Desk. The New Yorker.
- — (March 30, 2012). "Funders Behind New Anti-Obama Ad Blitz Stay Hidden". News Desk. The New Yorker.
- — (April 14, 2012). "Hilary and Hillary: Political Mommy Wars". News Desk. The New Yorker.
- — (April 29, 2012). "White House Correspondents' Dinner: The Funnier Candidate?". News Desk. The New Yorker.
- — (June 15, 2012). "Have Not Love: How Bryan Fischer Turned on a Friend". News Desk. The New Yorker.
- — (June 18, 2012). "Bully Pulpit". Letter from Tupelo. The New Yorker.
- — (June 27, 2012). "The Kochs v. Cato: Winners and Losers". News Desk. The New Yorker.
- — (June 28, 2012). "The Health-Care Ruling That Wasn't". News Desk. The New Yorker.
- — (July 30, 2012). "Precious Wood". The Talk of the Town. Wind on Capitol Hill. The New Yorker.
- — (August 11, 2012). "Ayn Rand Joins the Ticket". News Desk. The New Yorker.
- — (August 20, 2012). "On Super PACs, Did Obama Get It Wrong?". News Desk. The New Yorker.
- — (August 27, 2012). "Schmooze or Lose". The Political Scene. The New Yorker.
- — (August 29, 2012). "The Mousy Majority". News Desk. The New Yorker.
- — (September 2, 2012). "Out of the Shadows". News Desk. The New Yorker.
- — (September 26, 2012). "Larry McCarthy, the Missing Link?". News Desk. The New Yorker.
- — (October 29, 2012). "The Voter-Fraud Myth". The Political Scene. The New Yorker.
- — (November 1, 2012). "Notes on Voter Fraud". News Desk. The New Yorker.
- — (November 3, 2012). "Is a Second Term Harder for Presidents to Win?". News Desk. The New Yorker.
- — (November 6, 2012). "A Disputed Voter Goes To the Polls". News Desk. The New Yorker.
- — (November 11, 2012). "A Petraeus Puzzle: Were Politics Involved?". News Desk. The New Yorker.
- — (November 19, 2012). "Seeing Spots". The Talk of the Town. Plan of Attack. The New Yorker. 88 (36): 30–32.
- — (December 5, 2012). "2012: Top Ten Ways to Survive the Washington Holiday Party". News Desk. The New Yorker.
- — (December 14, 2012). "Zero Conscience in 'Zero Dark Thirty'". News Desk. The New Yorker.
- — (January 21, 2013). "No Takers". News Desk. The New Yorker.
- — (February 15, 2013). "Torture and Obama's Drone Program". News Desk. The New Yorker.
- — (February 22, 2013). "Is Senator Ted Cruz Our New McCarthy?". Daily Comment. The New Yorker.
- — (February 23, 2013). "Ted Cruz Responds—And Still Sees Red at Harvard Law". News Desk. The New Yorker.
- — (March 5, 2013). "Obama's Transparency Test". News Desk. The New Yorker.
- — (March 15, 2013). "Charles Murray's Gay-Marriage Surprise". News Desk. The New Yorker.
- — (May 23, 2013). "Stephen Colbert on David Koch and PBS". News Desk. The New Yorker.
- — (May 23, 2013). "Obama's Challenge to an Endless War". Daily Comment. The New Yorker.
- — (May 27, 2013). "David Koch vs. PBS". The Media. The New Yorker.
- — (June 6, 2013). "What's the Matter with Metadata?". News Desk. The New Yorker.
- — (June 30, 2013). "Koch Pledge Tied to Congressional Climate Inaction". News Desk. The New Yorker.
- — (August 13, 2013). "Paying for 'Citizen Koch'". News Desk. The New Yorker.
- — (September 26, 2013). "Top C.I.A. Lawyer Sides with Senate Torture Report". News Desk. The New Yorker.
- — (October 25, 2013). "The Koch Brothers in California?". Currency. The New Yorker.
- — (November 15, 2013). "Is IKEA the New Model for the Conservative Movement?". News Desk. The New Yorker.
- — (January 11, 2014). "Crossing Larry Speakes". News Desk. The New Yorker.
- — (January 21, 2014). "Snowden Calls Russian-Spy Story "Absurd" in Exclusive Interview". News Desk. The New Yorker.
- — (May 5, 2014). "Ronald Reagan's Benghazi". Daily Comment. The New Yorker.
- — (October 20, 2014). "Video: Snowden Would "Love" an Open Trial". News Desk. The New Yorker.
- — (December 13, 2014). "The Real Torture Patriots". News Desk. The New Yorker.
- — (December 18, 2014). "The unidentified queen of torture". The New Yorker.
- — (December 22–29, 2014). "Torture and the truth". The Talk of the Town. Comment. The New Yorker. 90 (41): 43–44.
- — (July 31, 2015). "Does Zimbabwe Really Need Trophy Hunting?". News Desk. The New Yorker.
- — (November 18, 2015). "Do the Kochs Have Their Own Spy Network?". News Desk. The New Yorker.
- — (January 25, 2016). "New Koch : the billionaire brothers are championing criminal justice reform. Has their formula changed?". A Reporter at Large. The New Yorker. 91: 45.
- — (March 3, 2016). "Is This the End of Big-Money Politics?". Daily Comment. The New Yorker.
- — (March 15, 2016). "Who Sponsored the Hate?". News Desk. The New Yorker.
- — (April 26, 2016). "Koch for Clinton? Not a Chance". News Desk. The New Yorker.
- — (May 20, 2016). "The Transcript of James O'Keefe's Call to the Open Society Foundations". News Desk. The New Yorker.
- — (May 30, 2016). "James O'Keefe Accidentally Stings Himself". The Political Scene. The New Yorker.
- — (July 20, 2016). "Donald Trump Threatens the Ghostwriter of "The Art of the Deal"". News Desk. The New Yorker.
- — (July 25, 2016). "Trump's Boswell speaks : the ghostwriter of 'The Art of the Deal' says that Trump is unfit to lead". The Political Scene. The New Yorker. 92 (22): 20–26.
- — (July 28, 2016). "Trump and Russia: Even Historians See No Precedent". News Desk. The New Yorker.
- — (October 3, 2016). "Donald Trump, American Oligarch". News Desk. The New Yorker.
- — (October 24, 2016). "Documenting Trump's Abuse of Women". Ink. The New Yorker.
- — (October 29, 2016). "James Comey Broke with Loretta Lynch and Justice Department Tradition". News Desk. The New Yorker.
- — (November 23, 2016). "Betsy DeVos, Trump's Big-Donor Education Secretary". News Desk. The New Yorker.
- — (December 7, 2016). "Scott Pruitt, Trump's Industry Pick for the E.P.A." News Desk. The New Yorker.
- — (January 25, 2017). "Trump's Tough-Guy Talk on Torture Risks Real Lives". News Desk. The New Yorker.
- — (March 27, 2017). "The Reclusive Hedge-Fund Tycoon Behind The Trump Presidency". A Reporter at Large. The New Yorker.
- — (May 22, 2017). "Should Psychiatrists Speak Out Against Trump?". On the Couch. The New Yorker.
- — (June 5, 2017). "In the Withdrawal from the Paris Climate Agreement, the Koch Brothers' Campaign Becomes Overt". News Desk. The New Yorker.
- — (June 16, 2017). "The Link Between Domestic Violence and Mass Shootings". News Desk. The New Yorker.
- — (August 8, 2017). "Has James O'Keefe Accidentally Stung Himself Again?". News Desk. The New Yorker.
- — (October 10, 2017). "The Danger of President Pence". Letter from Washington. The New Yorker.
- — (November 1, 2017). "Anita Hill on Weinstein, Trump, and a Watershed Moment for Sexual-Harassment Accusations". News Desk. The New Yorker.
- — (November 28, 2017). "Can Time Inc. Survive the Kochs?". News Desk. The New Yorker.
- — (December 21, 2017). "A Conservative Nonprofit That Seeks to Transform College Campuses Faces Allegations of Racial Bias and Illegal Campaign Activity". News Desk. The New Yorker.
- — (March 12, 2018). "Christopher Steele, the Man Behind the Trump Dossier". A Reporter at Large. The New Yorker.
- — (March 13, 2018). "A Trump Trip to Las Vegas Adds Intrigue to the Steele Dossier". News Desk. The New Yorker.
- —; Farrow, Ronan (May 7, 2018). "Four Women Accuse New York's Attorney General of Physical Abuse". News Desk. The New Yorker.
- — (June 7, 2018). "One Koch Brother Forces the Other Out of the Family Business". News Desk. The New Yorker.
- — (July 2, 2018). "A Parlor Game at Rebekah Mercer's Has No Get Out of Jail Free Card". The Leisure Class. The New Yorker.
- — (July 14, 2018). "Red-State Democrats' Fears Over Kavanaugh Vote May Be Overblown". News Desk. The New Yorker.
- — (August 1, 2018). "Trump vs. Koch Is a Custody Battle Over Congress". News Desk. The New Yorker.
- —; Farrow, Ronan (September 14, 2018). "A Sexual-Misconduct Allegation Against the Supreme Court Nominee Brett Kavanaugh Stirs Tension Among Democrats in Congress". News Desk. The New Yorker.
- —; Farrow, Ronan (September 23, 2018). "Senate Democrats Investigate a New Allegation of Sexual Misconduct, from Brett Kavanaugh's College Years". News Desk. The New Yorker.
- — (January 18, 2021). "Cretin hop". The Talk of the Town. A Proud Boy Speaks. The New Yorker. 96 (44): 13–15.
- — (March 1, 2021). "SWAT Team". The Talk of the Town. The Bench. The New Yorker. 97 (2): 15–16.
- — (March 22, 2021). "Trump in the crosshairs: will Cyrus Vance, Jr., indict the former President for financial crimes?". A Reporter at Large. The New Yorker. 97 (5): 18–24.
- — (August 9, 2021). "The Big Money Behind the Big Lie: Who is funding the election-fraud myth?". A Reporter at Large. The New Yorker: 30–41.
- — (May 16, 2022). "Roe-gate". The Talk of the Town. Scooping the Court. The New Yorker. 98 (12): 18–19.
- — (August 6, 2022). "Goodbye, Columbus: How an extreme minority has upended democracy in Ohio". A Reporter at Large. The New Yorker: 22–28.
