= Dark Money (book) =

2016 book by Jane Mayer

- First edition
- Author: Jane Mayer
- Language: English
- Subject: Political science; economics
- Publisher: Doubleday
- Publication date: January 2016
- Publication place: United States
- Media type: Print (hardcover); e-book
- Pages: 464
- ISBN: 978-0-385-53559-5

Dark Money: The Hidden History of the Billionaires Behind the Rise of the Radical Right is a 2016 non-fiction book written by American investigative journalist Jane Mayer. The book focuses on a network of extremely wealthy conservative Republicans, foremost among them Charles and David Koch, who have together funded an array of organizations that work in tandem to influence academic institutions, think tanks, the courts, statehouses, Congress, and the American presidency for their own benefit.

Mayer particularly discusses the Koch family and their political activities, along with Richard Mellon Scaife, John M. Olin, the Bradley brothers, as well as the DeVos and Coors families and their related foundations.

== See also ==
- Citizen Koch (2013) documentary film
- Company Town
- Koch Brothers Exposed
- Democracy in Chains (2017)
- Kochland (2019)
