= Christopher Leonard (author) =

American investigative journalist

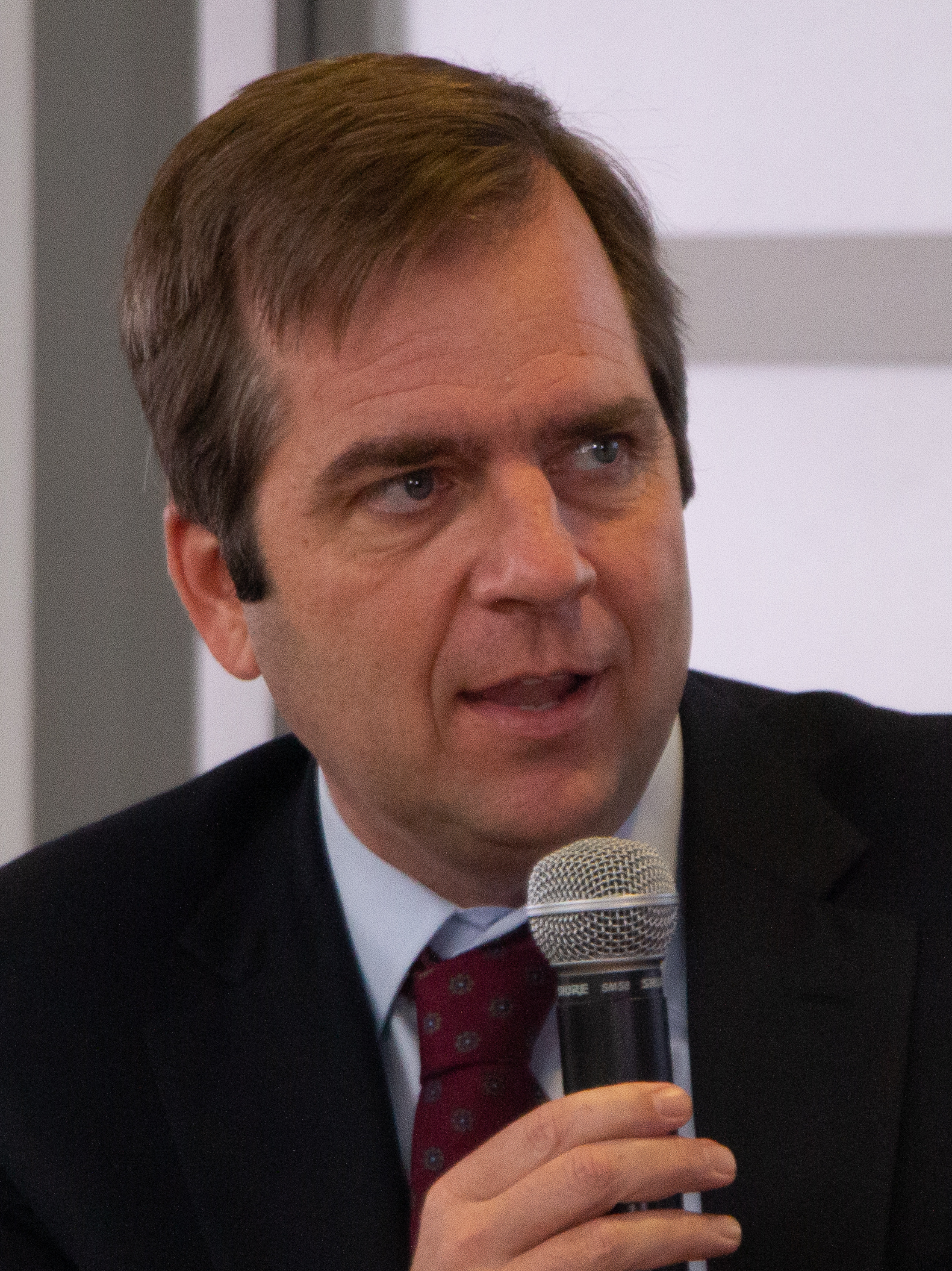
- Leonard in 2019
- Born: Kansas City, Missouri, U.S.
- Education: University of Missouri (B.A.)
- Occupations: Journalist, author
- Notable work: The Meat Racket (2014); Kochland (2019)
- Website: www.christopherleonard.biz

Christopher Leonard (born c. 1975) is an American investigative journalist. He has written three books, The Meat Racket: The Secret Takeover of America's Food Business, the New York Times best-selling Kochland: The Secret History of Koch Industries and Corporate Power in America, and The Lords of Easy Money: How the Federal Reserve Broke the American Economy. His work has appeared in The New York Times, The Wall Street Journal, Fortune, and Bloomberg Businessweek.

Leonard is a native of Kansas City, Missouri and a graduate of the University of Missouri Journalism School.

Leonard began his career at the Columbia, Missouri Columbia Daily Tribune before moving to the Arkansas Democrat-Gazette. He moved to the Associated Press in 2005 where he focused on agri-business issues.

In 2014 Leonard joined the New America Foundation where he finished his first book, The Meat Racket which received positive reviews, and has been praised as tracing "the evolution of the modern American meat industry". While at New America he began work on his second book, Kochland, which was published in 2019 to positive reviews. In 2019, Leonard helped to found the Watchdog Writers Group at the Missouri School of Journalism Reynolds Journalism Institute, where he currently serves as Director.

== Books ==
- The Meat Racket: The Secret Takeover of America's Food Business
- Kochland: The Secret History of Koch Industries and Corporate Power in America
- The Lords of Easy Money: How the Federal Reserve Broke the American Economy (2022)

== Awards ==
Leonard was a Bernard L. Schwartz Fellow at the New America Foundation from 2014 to 2017.

In 2017 he was awarded the J. Anthony Lukas Work-in-Progress Award for Kochland.

In 2019, Kochland was also a finalist for the Financial Times and McKinsey Business Book of the Year Award.
