= Electoral and ethics policy of the Biden administration =

Overview of the Biden administration's electoral and ethical policies

The Joe Biden administration pledged to pass government ethics reform. The Biden administration also pledged to pass legislation and enforce policies to enforce electoral reform, in response to the influence of special interests and gerrymandering in elections.

== Background ==
=== Ethics violations ===
The Donald Trump administration has been accused of multiple ethics violations and removing lobbying bans for personal profit and political benefit for reelection, and officials had been accused of violating the Hatch Act of 1939 multiple times. The administration used the White House lawn during the 2020 Republican National Convention and had Secretary of State Mike Pompeo deliver remarks on an official visit overseas, which many outside sources said violated the Hatch Act.

=== Attempts to overturn the 2020 presidential election ===
Trump engaged in multiple attempts to overturn the results of the 2020 United States presidential election.

== Electoral reform ==
Biden has suggested that the 2022 United States elections could be illegitimate if his proposed election laws are not passed due to Republican-controlled legislature's enacted legislation.

=== Campaign finance reform and Voter Registration ===
The Biden administration supported the For the People Act (also known as HR 1) which seeks to expand voting rights, reduce the influence of money in politics, limit partisan gerrymandering, and create new ethics rules for federal officeholders. The bill was passed by the House on March 3, 2021, and is currently in the Senate. On March 7, 2021, the anniversary of Bloody Sunday, Biden signed an executive order extending National Voter Registration Act of 1993 agency designation to federal agencies wherever permitted by state governments, allowing federal agencies, upon state request, to provide opportunities for those who access their services to be provided voter registration and education opportunities.

=== Electoral Count Act reform ===
Following the attempts to overturn the 2020 election, calls were made to make revise the 1887 Electoral Count Act. Such revisions were deemed necessary to clarify and adjust the roles of Congress and the Vice President in counting electoral votes. Reforms were included in a December 2022 omnibus bill, which Biden signed into law on December 29, 2022.

== Ethics reform ==
=== Role of lobbyists ===
Biden signed Executive Order 13989, Ethic Commitments by Executive Branch Personnel, which set the follow lobbying restrictions for political appointees:

- banned from "accepting gifts from registered lobbyists or lobbying organizations for the duration of their service"
- banned for 2 years from the date of their appointment to "participate in any particular matter involving specific parties that is directly and substantially related to ... former employers or former clients, including regulations and contracts"
- banned for 1 year following the end of my appointment to "assist others in making communications or appearances that [they] am prohibited from undertaking by being available to engage in lobbying activities in support of any such communications or appearances; or engaging in any such lobbying activities"
- banned from lobbying "any covered executive branch official or non-career Senior Executive Service appointee, or engage in any activity on behalf of any foreign government or foreign political party which ... for the remainder of the Administration or 2 years following the end of [their] appointment, whichever is later." after government service
- banned from "accepting any salary or other cash payment from [former employers] the eligibility for and payment of which is limited to individuals accepting a position in the United States Government, as well as any non-cash benefit from [former employers] that is provided in lieu of such a prohibited cash payment."

=== DOJ independence ===
Executive Order 13989 also stated the commitments of political appointees to conduct that upholds the independence of law enforcement and precludes improper interference with investigative or prosecutorial decisions of the Department of Justice. Biden promised during the campaign trail that Attorney General Merrick Garland would work for the American people and not as the President's personal lawyer.

=== Transparency and data availability ===
Biden restarted the usual routine of daily press briefings that had been stopped by the Trump administration during the COVID-19 pandemic in light of frequent criticisms and gaffes. In the Biden administration's first press briefing, White House press secretary Jen Psaki stated that her focus was on "bringing truth and transparency back to the briefing room" and that she had a "deep respect for the role of a free and independent press in our democracy and for the role all of [them] play".
