= William Masselos =

American musician (1920–1992)

William Masselos (August 11, 1920 – October 23, 1992) was an American classical pianist.

== Biography ==
William Masselos was born in Niagara Falls, New York to a Dutch mother and a Greek father. He made his New York debut at The Town Hall in 1938 at the age of 18.

He studied with Carl Friedberg, a disciple of Johannes Brahms and Clara Schumann, and also with Nelly Reuschel (another Clara Schumann disciple) at New York's Institute of Musical Art (later called Juilliard School).

In 1952, at the age of 32, Masselos played the Brahms Piano Concerto in D minor in his first appearance with the New York Philharmonic Orchestra, led by Dimitri Mitropoulos. This impressive debut was the first in a long line of appearances with major orchestras which also included the New York Philharmonic under Pierre Monteux and Leonard Bernstein, the Montreal Symphony under Otto Klemperer, the London Philharmonic under Bernard Haitink, the American Symphony Orchestra under Leopold Stokowski, the Philadelphia Orchestra under Eugene Ormandy, and numerous others.

Known as a champion of contemporary music, Masselos premiered many works including the Charles Ives Piano Sonata No. 1, the Piano Fantasy by Aaron Copland, and most of the piano literature by Ben Weber, including the Concerto for Piano and Orchestra and the Fantasy (Variations), Op. 25. He was the soloist in the first performances of piano concertos by Alan Hovhaness, Johan Franco, Marga Richter, Carlos Surinach, and William Mayer, in addition to solo pieces by John Cage, Dane Rudhyar, Robert Helps, Carlos Chávez, and many others.

As an heir, through Carl Friedberg, of the Schumann and Brahms tradition, he was also particularly noted for his interpretation of the Schumann Davidsbundlertanze, Op. 6, and the Brahms Sonatas, both of which he recorded for RCA Red Seal in the early 1970s and are highly esteemed by record collectors.

Masselos died in New York City in October 1992, aged 72.

In May 2011, the pianist Lori Sims played a concert of works associated with Masselos at the Zankel Hall at Carnegie Hall, New York.
