= Robin Wright (author) =

American analyst, author and journalist

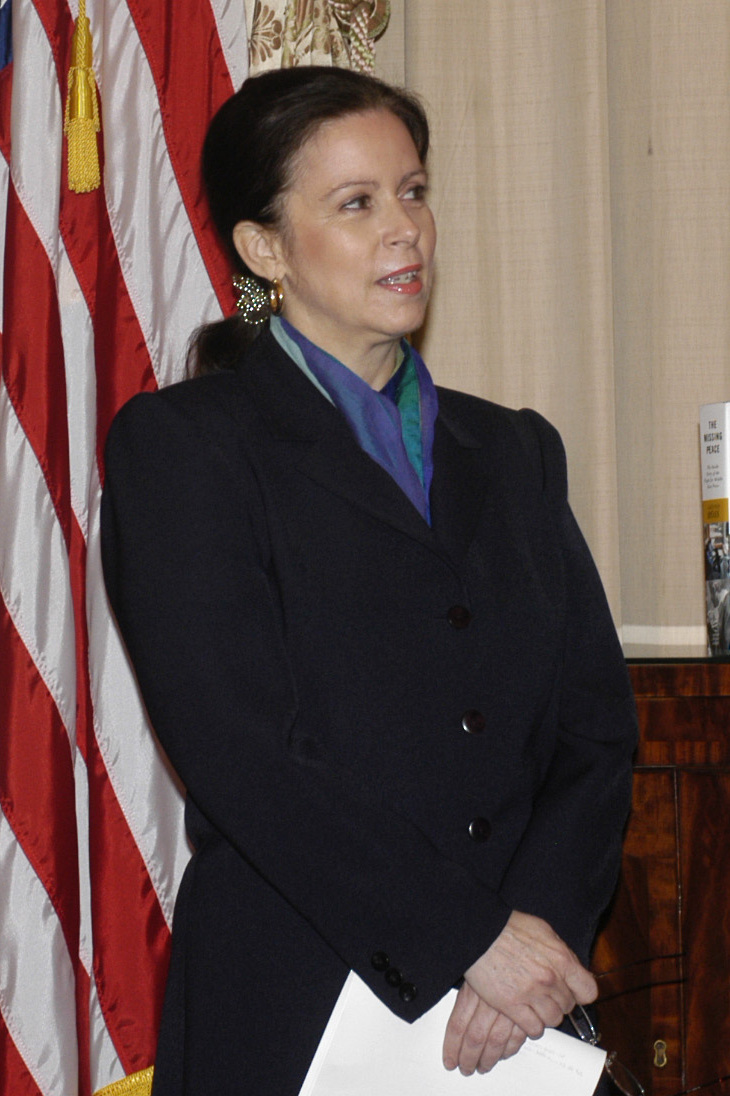
- Wright in 2004
- Born: Robin B. Wright; August 22, 1948 (age 78); Ann Arbor, Michigan
- Education: University of Michigan
- Occupation: Journalist

Robin B. Wright (born August 22, 1948), is an American foreign affairs analyst, author and journalist who has covered wars, revolutions and uprisings around the world. She writes for The New Yorker and is a fellow of the U.S. Institute of Peace and the Woodrow Wilson Center. Wright has authored five books and coauthored or edited three others.

== Early life ==
Wright was born and raised in Ann Arbor, Michigan. She attended Pres Fleuris—Les Roches in Bluche-sur-Sierre, Switzerland. A graduate of the University of Michigan, she is the daughter of L. Hart Wright, a University of Michigan law professor and Phyllis Wright, a dancer and actress. She lives in Washington, D.C.

== Career ==
Wright received an Alicia Patterson Journalism Fellowship in 1975 to live in Africa and write about the dismantling of Portugal's African empire.

Wright has reported from more than 140 countries on seven continents for The New Yorker, The Washington Post, The Los Angeles Times, The New York Times Magazine, The Atlantic, The Sunday Times of London, Foreign Policy (2011–2019), Foreign Affairs, CBS News, The Christian Science Monitor, and others. She did several tours as a foreign correspondent based in the Middle East, Europe, Africa, and as a roving foreign correspondent in Latin America and Asia. She formerly covered U.S. foreign policy and national security for The Washington Post. She is currently a columnist for The New Yorker.

Wright has been a fellow at Yale, Duke, Stanford, Dartmouth, the U.S. Institute of Peace, the Smithsonian's Woodrow Wilson International Center for Scholars, the Brookings Institution, the Carnegie Endowment for International Peace, the University of California at Santa Barbara, and the University of Southern California.

Wright's book Rock the Casbah: Rage and Rebellion across the Islamic world (2011) was selected as the Best Book on International Affairs by the Overseas Press Club in 2011. Among her other books, Dreams and Shadows: The Future of the Middle East (2008) was selected by both The New York Times and The Washington Post as one of the most notable books of the year.

As an analyst, Wright has appeared on NBC's Meet the Press, The Today Show, and Nightly News; CBS's Face the Nation, Morning News and Evening News; and ABC's This Week and Nightline, among many other programs.

== Awards and honors ==
- 1976: Overseas Press Club Bob Considine Award for "best reporting in any medium requiring exceptional courage and initiative" for the Christian Science Monitor's coverage of the Angolan war.
- 1989: National Magazine Award for reportage from Iran in The New Yorker
- 2001: Georgetown University Institute for the Study of Diplomacy Weintal Prize "for most distinguished diplomatic reporting" in the Washington Post
- 2003: U.N. Correspondents Association Gold Medal for analysis and coverage of international affairs
- 2004: National Press Club award for diplomatic reporting
- 2004: American Academy of Diplomacy journalist of the year for "distinguished reporting and analysis of international affairs"
- 2015, May 2: honorary Doctor of Humane Letters from her alma mater, the University of Michigan.

She is the recipient of a John D. and Catherine T. MacArthur Foundation grant.

== Bibliography ==
External videos
- Booknotes interview with Wright on In the Name of God, November 19, 1989, C-SPAN
- Presentation by Wright on The Last Great Revolution, February 17, 2000, C-SPAN
- After Words interview with Wright on Dreams and Shadows, March 29, 2008, C-SPAN
- Washington Journal interview with Wright on Rock the Casbah, August 8, 2011, C-SPAN

- Robin Wright (1985). Sacred rage : the crusade of modern Islam. New York: Linden Press/Simon and Schuster.
- — (1986) [1985]. Sacred rage : the crusade of modern Islam. UK edition. London: Andre Deutsch.
- Robin Wright, In the Name of God: The Khomeini Decade, Simon & Schuster (October 1989) ISBN 978-0-671-67235-5
  - Booknotes interview of Wright about In the Name of God, (November 19, 1989)
- Robin Wright and Doyle McManus, Flashpoints: Promise and Peril in a New World, Ballantine Books (December 22, 1992) ISBN 978-0-449-90673-6
- Robin Wright, The Last Great Revolution: Turmoil and Transformation in Iran (2000) ISBN 978-0-375-70630-1
- — (2001). Sacred rage : the wrath of militant Islam. Revised edition. New York: Simon and Schuster.
- Robin Wright, Dreams and Shadows: The Future of the Middle East, Penguin Press (2008) ISBN 1-59420-111-0, a New York Times Notable Book in 2008 and one of The Washington Post’s “Best Books of 2008”
- Robin Wright (editor), The Iran Primer: Power, Politics, and U.S. Policy, United States Institute of Peace Press (December 1, 2010) ISBN 978-1-60127-084-9
- Robin Wright, Rock the Casbah: Rage and Rebellion Across the Islamic World Simon & Schuster (July 19, 2011) ISBN 978-1-4391-0316-6
- Robin Wright (editor), The Islamists are Coming: Who They Really Are United States Institute of Peace Press (April 2012) ISBN 978-1601271341
- — (July 27, 2015). "Tehran's promise : the revolution's midlife crisis and the nuclear deal". Letter from Iran. The New Yorker. Vol. 91, no. 21. pp. 22–28.
