= Lee Fang =

American journalist (born 1986)

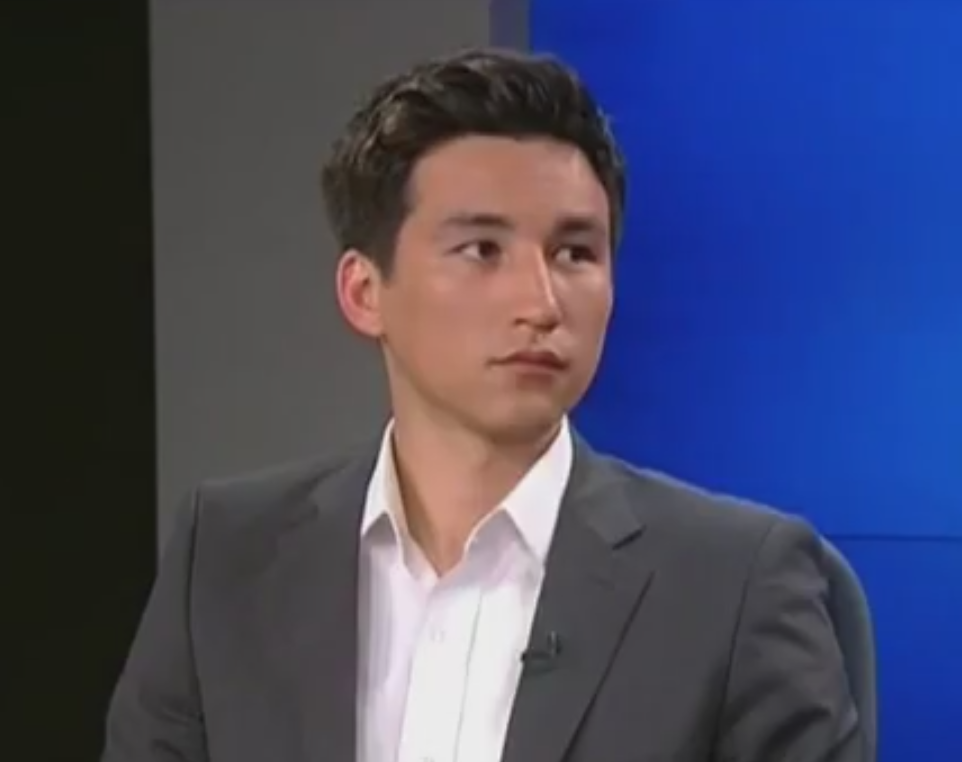
- Fang on The Big Picture with Thom Hartmann in 2012
- Born: Lee Hu Fang; October 31, 1986 (age 40); Prince George's County, Maryland, U.S.
- Education: University of Maryland, College Park (BA)
- Occupations: Journalist; author
- Spouse: Maytak Chin (m. 2018)
- Website: leefang.substack.com

Lee Hu Fang (born October 31, 1986) is an American journalist. He was previously an investigative reporter at The Intercept, a contributing writer at The Nation, and a writer at the Republic Report. He began his career as an investigative blogger for ThinkProgress. Fang shared the 2018 Izzy Award of the Park Center for Independent Media with fellow Intercept reporter Sharon Lerner, investigative reporter Dahr Jamail, and author Todd Miller.

== Early life and career ==
Fang's home town is in Prince George's County, Maryland. He attended the University of Maryland, College Park, graduating with a B.A. in government and politics in 2009. In college, Fang served as President of the Federation of Maryland College Democrats, editor of the Maryland College Democrat blog, and on the Campus Progress Advisory Board. Fang interned with ThinkProgress and served as a researcher for Progressive Accountability. As an undergraduate, Fang also interned for Congresswoman Stephanie Tubbs Jones (D-OH), Congressman Steny Hoyer (D-MD), for progressive media watchdog group Media Matters for America, and for the lobbying firm Westin Rinehart.

== ThinkProgress ==
In 2011, Fang published several articles alleging that special interests manipulated the media reaction to the Occupy Wall Street protests.

=== United States Chamber of Commerce article ===
In October 2010, ThinkProgress published an article by Fang in which he alleged that the United States Chamber of Commerce funded political attack campaigns from its general fund, which solicits funds from foreign sources. Fang stated that the Chamber was "likely skirting longstanding campaign finance law that bans the involvement of foreign corporations in American elections."

The story was repeated by The Huffington Post and the progressive activist group MoveOn.org asked the Department of Justice to launch a criminal investigation of the Chamber's funding.

The fact-checking website FactCheck.org analyzed the claim that was being made by the Democratic Party that "foreign corporations are 'stealing our democracy' with secret, illegal contributions funneled through the U.S. Chamber of Commerce". It referred to Fang's article as the original source of the allegations. FactCheck concluded that "It's a claim with little basis in fact." Eric Lichtblau of The New York Times wrote that the article "provided no evidence that the money generated overseas had been used in United States campaigns."

=== Reporting on Koch Industries ===
In April 2011, Fang wrote an article titled "The Contango Game: How Koch Industries Manipulates The Oil Market For Profit," in which he said "Koch Industries occupies a unique role in manipulating the oil market." The story was picked up by CBS.

Fang had previously written about Charles and David Koch, and he was involved with a Robert Greenwald documentary titled Koch Brothers Exposed. In March 2011, he reported that New Media Strategies, a firm employed by the Kochs, had been caught manipulating Wikipedia content and were banned from the website for sockpuppetry. Politico wrote that "Fang's relentless chronicling of the Koch brothers have made him something of a star on the left."

== The Intercept ==
Fang started working with The Intercept as an investigative reporter in February 2015. In April 2023 he left, and began writing for Substack.

In June 2020, Fang was accused of racism by Akela Lacy, a colleague at The Intercept. This occurred after Fang shared a Martin Luther King Jr. quote about remaining non-violent and tweeted out an interview in which a black man at a George Floyd protest expressed concern about black-on-black crime. Fang's tweets set off a "firestorm" on Twitter and he issued a lengthy apology.

=== Twitter Files ===
In December 2022, Fang reported in The Intercept that Twitter "provided direct approval and internal protection to the U.S. military's network of social media accounts and online personas." The Department of Defense utilized a network of Twitter accounts to shape opinion on American interventions in the Middle East as part of a "government-backed covert propaganda campaign." Many of the accounts operated without disclosure of their US government affiliation. The piece was a part of a broader journalistic effort by Matt Taibbi called the Twitter Files, initiated after Elon Musk's purchase of the platform, an investigation into Twitter's content moderation practices and their effect on American political events.

== Political views ==
Fang has been described as a "liberal" by The New York Times, and as both "liberal" and "progressive" by Salon. Liberal commentator Jonathan Chait described Fang as "left-wing" and wrote "Like many Bernie Sanders supporters, Fang often lacerates mainstream liberals both for insufficient populist zeal and, on occasion, for excessive focus on identity at the expense of class. His views on economics put him well to the left of the Democratic Party, while his views on race and gender would sit comfortably in the middle of it, and often put him at odds with fellow leftists."

According to Fang, regarding his field research for his book The Machine: A Field Guide to the Resurgent Right, "I like hanging out with fully grassroots Tea Party activists because, for the most part, whatever their motivations are, they're just upset about society and they want to do something about it which, at the core, I respect even though I pretty much disagree with their worldview."

== Personal life ==
Fang's brother, Daniel, is the drummer for the band Turnstile.

== Bibliography ==
- Fang, Lee (2013). The Machine: A Field Guide to the Resurgent Right. New York: The New Press. ISBN 978-1-59558-639-1.
