= The Meat Racket =

2014 book by Christopher Leonard

The Meat Racket: The Secret Takeover of America's Food Business
- First edition
- Author: Christopher Leonard
- Genre: nonfiction
- Publisher: Simon & Schuster
- Publication date: 2014
- ISBN: 9781451645835
- Followed by: Kochland
- Website: Publisher's web page for the book

The Meat Racket: The Secret Takeover of America's Food Business is a 2014 book by Christopher Leonard about the meat processing industry in the United States that focuses on Tyson Foods as the market leader. Widely reviewed on publication, the book gained additional attention during the COVID-19 pandemic in 2020.

== Author ==
A graduate of the University of Missouri, Leonard was formerly an agribusiness reporter for the Arkansas Democrat-Gazette and the Associated Press. He was a fellow at the New America Foundation when he wrote the book.

== Content ==
Several reviewers emphasized vertical integration (dubbed chickenization) as key to the growth of Tyson Foods as described in the book. Kirkus Reviews described the book's message as "Using Tyson as a window on modern meat production, Leonard shows how the company has eliminated free market competition through vertical integration, buying up independent suppliers (feed mills, slaughterhouses and hatcheries) and controlling farmers through restrictive contracts." In The Wall Street Journal, Moira Hodgson wrote that the book describes how the company founder John W. Tyson "left his nearly bankrupt family's farm in Missouri. He headed with his wife, his son and his truck to Arkansas, where he began to invest in chickens, hauling birds from the South, where they were cheap, to Chicago, Detroit and St. Louis. He used his profits to buy chicken houses and eventually bought his own hatchery and feed mill, vertically integrating his company by buying up the firms that supplied it." Christine Sismondo, writing for the Toronto Star, described how Tyson "got into all aspects of the business, starting with chicken feed and hatcheries, until he owned practically every cog in the chain that linked the egg to the grocery store, " adding that "Business majors will recognize this as an early and successful instance of 'vertical integration,' something Tyson pioneered in agri-business. Having tight control over the whole supply chain paid off and Tyson Foods is one of the largest meat producer in the world, with a practical monopoly on wings, nuggets and tenders plus a stronghold on pork and beef as well. Writing in the Virginia Quarterly Review, James McWilliams characterized Tyson's methods as described in the book as a "rotten system", adding that "Tyson’s vertical integration enables the company to dictate contracts that enfeeble growers in insidious ways." McWilliams concluded that a chicken farmer "has no control over the health of his birds or the quality of his feed", adding that "an unruly contract grower will quickly become the unknowing recipient of inferior food and sick hatchlings—in essence, the season’s dregs. Contractually, he can do nothing about the hand Tyson deals him. His numbers will drop and, after a few lackluster growing periods, the manager, citing the low figures, will fire the farmer, leaving him to default on his bank loan. What Tyson gets out of the move is both the removal of a troublesome farmer and space for a new farmer to get a new loan to build a new set of barns." In the American Journal of Agricultural Economics, K. Aleks Schaefer wrote that the book "traces the evolution of the modern American meat industry from its post-Depression origins to the present through the eyes of Tyson Foods’ innovators and contract farmers. Readers experience first-hand the exhilaration of a young couple breaking ground on their first chicken farm and suffer the sorrow of that same couple, years later, as their farm is foreclosed. We sit in Neal's Café, a small diner in Springdale, Arkansas, as John and Don Tyson, in their matching khaki coveralls, discuss corporate strategy and contrive the McDonalds McNugget."

== Critical reception ==
In The New York Times, Nick Reding described the book as a "brilliant, in-depth portrait of Tyson Foods" that "leans left, with a journalist’s tireless reporting and uncommon empathy for small producers of chicken and pork, making it easy to fault Tyson for everything that ails us." Writing in The Washington Post, Bethany McLean described the book as a "deeply reported narrative about how big business has come to rule the production of meat." A review in Publishers Weekly said that the author "pulls off a stunning feat in putting the heat on the major industrial meat giants," adding that "the hardest body blows are landed by Leonard on Tyson Foods, the nation's biggest meat company, whose production and distribution practices were previously hush-hush, due to a rigid code of silence and potential retaliation on those who snitch. Founded during the Great Depression, Tyson Foods fashioned a highly profitable empire through smart alliances with bankers, creating a network of local contract farmers and keeping them on a short economic leash while controlling the entirety of the supply chain." Dan Charles of National Public Radio wrote that the book "aims a spotlight at Tyson Foods, which helped create the modern chicken industry. And it recounts the stories of people, mostly farmers, whom Leonard contends Tyson has chewed up and cast aside since its incorporation in 1947.

== Attention during the COVID-19 pandemic ==
During the COVID-19 pandemic in 2020, the book was mentioned in the press and its author Christopher Leonard was quoted as an expert on Tyson Foods as the coronavirus spread through the meat processing industry. In an interview published in the Los Angeles Times, Leonard said "This is 100% a symptom of consolidation," adding "We don’t have a crisis of supply right now. We have a crisis in processing. And the virus is exposing the profound fragility that comes with this kind of consolidation." In the Financial Times of London, Leonard was quoted about the full page ad that John H. Tyson signed in The New York Times and other papers, calling the statement "extraordinarily rare, if not unprecedented," adding "to so blatantly advertise that the system is falling apart was breathtaking. I mean, the entire rationale for Tyson Foods’ existing is that they can get meat to the grocery counter consistently, affordably and in a way that doesn't make you sick."
