= Citizen Koch =

- Directed by: Tia Lessin; Carl Deal
- Production company: Elsewhere Films
- Distributed by: Variance Films
- Release date: 2013
- Country: United States

Citizen Koch is a 2013 film produced and directed by Tia Lessin and Carl Deal, concerning the political influence of American plutocrats on the political process following the US Supreme Court decision in Citizens United v. FEC which granted corporations the ability to anonymously spend unlimited money to influence public policy and elections. The film focuses on the eponymous Koch brothers, in particular, and their political and financial support for Wisconsin governor Scott Walker, who represents the Citizen Koch in the title. The film chronicles the rise of the Tea Party movement in response to the election of the first African-American President in 2008, and the strategic attacks on organized labor by Gov. Walker and Koch political operatives in other states as a strategy to eliminate liberal opposition.

Citizen Koch was completed using funds from a successful Kickstarter campaign, after public television's Independent Television Service (ITVS) pulled funding it had initially committed. The filmmakers were told by ITVS staff that the title, which referenced conservative billionaire David Koch, would be "extremely problematic" as Koch served on the boards of flagship public broadcasters WNET and WGBH. The filmmakers were also told directly by ITVS staff that the financial support would be restored after it premiered at the Sundance Film Festival, if they removed references to David Koch from the film.

Regarding the allegations of censorship and The New Yorker article which helped bring the case to public attention, the PBS ombudsman (without ever speaking to the filmmakers) has stated:

Although some of [Jane] Mayer's reporting about "Citizen Koch" is based on unnamed sources, the strength of the article does reflect the internal concerns that can or did, as the thrust of her article suggests, lead to intense internal pressures that come to equal self-censorship. The reporting and quotes throughout appear convincing. One unnamed public television official, referring to the "Citizen Koch" proposal, is quoted as saying that, "because of the Koch brothers, ITVS knew WNET would never air it. Never."

The film premiered at the 2013 Sundance Film Festival and was named to the shortlist by the Academy of Motion Picture Arts and Sciences for best documentary feature.

== See also ==
- Dark Money (book)
- Koch Brothers Exposed
- Company Town (film)
