= David Kaye =

David Kaye may refer to:

- David Kaye (voice actor), Canadian voice actor
- David A. Kaye, actor who played Jesse Waingrow in the film 3000 Miles to Graceland
- David Kaye (footballer) (born 1959), English footballer
- David Kaye (magician), known professionally as "Silly Billy"
- David Kaye (academic), UN Special Rapporteur on Freedom of Expression and Opinion
- Rabbi David Kaye, Washington, D.C.-based sex offender featured on To Catch a Predator and later incarcerated.

== See also ==
- David Kay (1941 – 2022), appointed to look for Iraq's stockpile of weapons of mass destruction following the U.S. invasion
