= The Dark Side (book) =

2008 non-fiction book by Jane Mayer

- Author: Jane Mayer
- Language: English
- Subject: Political convictions
- Publisher: Doubleday
- Publication date: July 2008
- Publication place: United States
- Media type: Print (Hardcover)
- Pages: 392
- ISBN: 978-0307456298

The Dark Side: The Inside Story of How the War on Terror Turned Into a War on American Ideals is a 2008 non-fiction book written by the American journalist Jane Mayer about the torture and detention of suspected enemy combatants during the war on terrorism, and the applicability of the Geneva Conventions to so-called enemy combatants.

== Content ==
The book details how the unsuccessful prosecution of John Walker Lindh convinced the President to circumvent the procedural protections of criminal trials. Enhanced interrogation techniques, adapted from the SERE techniques intended for special forces and intelligence agents who are captured, were applied to prisoners who were held and interrogated without trial, and then released.

While the SERE-based interrogation methods were developed and supervised by the Central Intelligence Agency and military psychologists, the White House Office of Legal Counsel set about the task of refuting allegations of torture. The approved interrogation methods were used at Guantanamo, Abu Ghraib (in Iraq), and allegedly at CIA black sites. Mayer recounts in detail the regimented authorizations that were needed during the interrogation of Khalid Sheikh Muhammad where "hundreds of different techniques" were authorized. Although waterboarding received the most public scrutiny, a government official told Mayer it was the combination and duration of multiple techniques that increased the severity for the prisoners: "The totality is just staggering".

Some government employees and lawyers were not convinced by John Yoo's torture memos, and were worried that they might be prosecuted. The legal arguments against the applicability of the Geneva Conventions were stronger for the Taliban prisoners than the Coalition Provisional Authority (CPA) in Iraq, whose interrogators were promised immunity by orders of the CPA. After Manadel al-Jamadi died in CIA interrogation, the agency continued to harbor doubts about whether the Geneva Conventions would apply in Iraq. The so-called Torture Memos were eventually rescinded by Jack Goldsmith, over David Addington's objections, and were in large part reinstanted by Goldsmith's successor Steven G. Bradbury. Mayer writes that the President decided not to pursue legislative options after the Supreme Court decision in Hamdan v. Rumsfeld (2006) held that the Geneva Conventions did apply. According to Mayer's account the driving force behind the enhanced interrogation program was the Vice-President's office.

== Reception ==
The book became a best-seller in non-fiction hardcover in the United States, with its author Jane Mayer booked on various news programs for interviews.

It later made the New York Times Book Review editors' list of "10 Best Books of 2008" and was nominated for the 2008 National Book Critics Circle Award in General Nonfiction. The book was a finalist for the National Book Awards.

It also received the Robert F. Kennedy Center for Justice and Human Rights 29th annual book award in 2009, given to an author who "most faithfully and forcefully reflects Robert Kennedy's purposes - his concern for the poor and the powerless, his struggle for honest and even-handed justice, his conviction that a decent society must assure all young people a fair chance, and his faith that a free democracy can act to remedy disparities of power and opportunity."

== See also ==
- Enhanced interrogation techniques
- Torture Memos
- Abu Ghraib torture and prisoner abuse
- Extraordinary rendition
- Ghost prisoners
