= Jan-Werner Müller =

German historian and political scientist (born 1970)

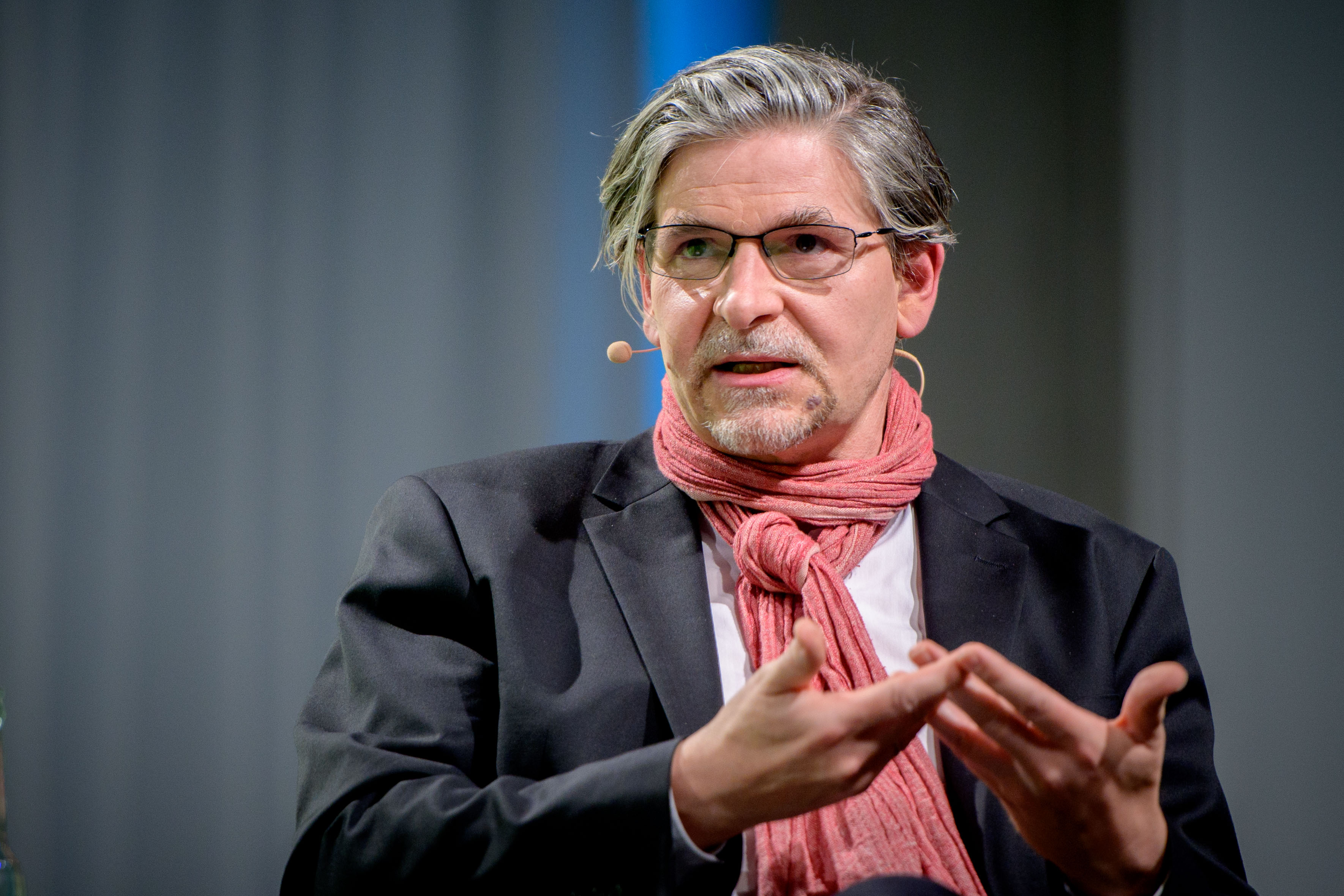
- Müller in 2021
- Occupation: Academic

Academic background
- Education: Free University of Berlin, University of Oxford, Princeton University

Academic work
- Discipline: Political science
- Sub-discipline: History of political ideas, political theory
- Institutions: Princeton University (since 2005)

Jan-Werner Müller (born 1970) is a German political philosopher and historian of political ideas working at Princeton University.

== Biography ==
Born in Bad Honnef, in North Rhine-Westphalia, in 1970, Jan-Werner Müller studied at the Free University of Berlin, the University College London, the University of Oxford's St Antony's College, and Princeton University. He was Fellow of All Souls College in Oxford from 1996 to 2003 and a Fellow of St Antony's College's European Studies Centre from 2003 to 2005. He has taught political theory and the history of political ideas at Princeton since 2005.

Müller has been invited scholar at Collegium Budapest, at the Remarque Institute of the New York University, at the Center for European Studies of Harvard University as well as the Robert Schuman Centre for Advanced Studies of the European University Institute in Florence. He has also been invited professor at the École des Hautes Études en Sciences Sociales, the Institut d’Études Politiques in Paris and at LMU Munich. He is a co-founder of the European College of Liberal Arts in Berlin.

Müller regularly writes opinion pieces for mainstream publications, such as The Guardian, Neue Zürcher Zeitung, The New York Times, Süddeutsche Zeitung, Le Monde, Project Syndicate, The New York Review of Books, the London Review of Books, and more specialised publications such as Foreign Affairs, Social Europe, and Verfassungsblog.

As of February 2026, he is still the Roger Williams Straus Professor of Social Sciences in the Politics Department, and the founding Director of the Project in the History of Political Thought at Princeton University.

== Works ==
- Another Country. German Intellectuals, Unification and National Identity. Yale University Press, New Haven, Connecticut, 2000, ISBN 978-0-300-08388-0.
- A Dangerous Mind. Carl Schmitt in Post War European Thought. Yale University Press, New Haven, Connecticut, 2003, ISBN 978-0-300-09932-4.
- (Ed.) Memory and Power in Post War Europe. Studies in the Presence of the Past. Cambridge University Press, Cambridge, 2002, ISBN 978-0-521-80610-7.
- (Ed.) German Ideologies since 1945. Studies in the Political Thought and Culture of the Bonn Republic. Palgrave Macmillan, New York City, New York, 2003, ISBN 978-0-312-29579-0.
- Constitutional Patriotism. Princeton University Press, Princeton, New Jersey, 2007, ISBN 978-0-691-11859-8
- Contesting Democracy. Political Ideas in Twentieth Century Europe. Yale University Press, New Haven, Connecticut, 2011, ISBN 978-0-300-19412-8
- Wo Europa endet. Ungarn, Brüssel und das Schicksal der liberalen Demokratie. Suhrkamp, Berlin, 2013, ISBN 978-3-518-06197-8
- What Is Populism? University of Pennsylvania Press, Philadelphia, Pennsylvania, 2016, ISBN 978-0-8122-4898-2
  - (as summary): The rise and rise of populism?, chapter in The Age of Perplexity, Penguin Random House Grupo Editorial, ISBN 978-84-306-1953-5
- Democracy Rules. Farrar, Straus and Giroux, New York City, New York, 2021, ISBN 9780374136475
