= Executive Order 13989 =

Executive order signed by U.S. President Joe Biden

- Ethics Commitments by Executive Branch Personnel
- Front page of Executive Order 13989
- Type: Executive order
- Number: 13989
- President: Joe Biden
- Signed: January 20, 2021; 5 years ago

Federal Register details
- Federal Register document number: 2021-01762
- Publication date: January 20, 2021
- Document citation: 86 FR 7029

Summary
- Guaranteeing the Executive Branch makes ethical commitments.

Repealed by
- Executive Order 14148, January 20, 2025; 21 months ago

Executive Order 13989, officially titled Ethic Commitments by Executive Branch Personnel, was signed on January 20, 2021, and is the fifth executive order signed by U.S. President Joe Biden. The order works to guarantee that the Executive Branch makes ethical commitments. It was rescinded by Donald Trump within hours of his assuming office on January 20, 2025.

== Provisions ==
This order declares that each appointee shall sign, and contractually agree upon, the following commitment upon his or her nomination in any executive agency appointed on or after January 20, 2021. It states, ”I recognize that this pledge is part of a broader ethics in government plan designed to restore and maintain public trust in government, and I commit myself to conduct consistent with that plan. I commit to decision-making on the merits and exclusively in the public interest, without regard to private gain or personal benefit. I commit to conduct that upholds the independence of law enforcement and precludes improper interference with investigative or prosecutorial decisions of the Department of Justice. I commit to ethical choices of post-Government employment that do not raise the appearance that I have used my Government service for private gain, including by using confidential information acquired and relationships established for the benefit of future clients.”

== Effects ==
The order aims to ensure that those in the Executive Branch will not accept bribes from lobbyists, engage in activities with a former employer, communicate with outsiders about the work they do, accept money from a former employer, and that they make hirings based on a person's qualifications, with the goal of restoring and maintaining public trust in the government.

== See also ==
- List of executive actions by Joe Biden
- 2020 United States census
