= Company Town (film) =

2016 environmental documentary film by Natalie Kottke-Masocco and Erica Sardarian

- Directed by: Natalie Kottke-Masocco; Erica Sardarian
- Written by: Natalie Kottke-Masocco; Erica Sardarian
- Produced by: David Johnson; Sidney Blumenthal; David Brock; Natalie Kottke-Masocco; Erica Sardarian; Edgar Sardarian; Adam Paul Smith
- Starring: David Bouie; Cheryl Slavant; Wilma Subra
- Music by: Zachary Dawes; Adam Gunther; Sean O'Brien; Mindy Jones
- Release date: October 9, 2016 (Mill Valley Film Festival)
- Running time: 90 minutes
- Country: United States
- Language: English

Company Town is an environmental documentary film by Natalie Kottke-Masocco and Erica Sardarian about alleged pollution by a Georgia-Pacific plant in Crossett, Arkansas, shot from 2011 to 2015. The documentary alleges that a spate of fatal cancers and other illnesses is due in part to the factory's emissions and improper waste disposal of known carcinogens including formaldehyde, dioxins, acetaldehyde, and chloroform. The plant has been owned by David Koch and Charles Koch since 2005. The film includes testimony from whistleblower David Guice, whose company was allegedly contracted to quietly dispose of "two hundred thousand cubic yards of 'ash' dredged from the Georgia-Pacific paper mill’s sediment ponds" across Georgia-Pacific property in the town. Baptist pastor David Bouie, 'riverkeeper' Cheryl Slavant, and others organize the Crossett community, many of whom work for the plant, and engage the regional Environmental Protection Agency office with limited results. The movie features commentary from American news commentator Van Jones.

== Background ==
=== Georgia-Pacific Paper Mill ===
Georgia-Pacific employs nearly 1,200 people in Arkansas. In Crossett, Arkansas, with an estimated population of 5,507 in 2010, many residents are employed by the local Georgia-Pacific Paper Mill. In fact, "most residents are fiercely protective of the plant."

However, there have been allegations that the Georgia-Pacific Paper Mill is responsible for clusters of cancer deaths in Crossett, particularly among mill-workers and those who live close to the mill. (Although, the "Arkansas Department of Health cancer registry shows the age-adjusted rate of cancer deaths in Ashley County, Arkansas to be slightly below the state average.") The plant, which employs many of the town's residents, "emits upwards of 1.5 million pounds of toxic chemicals every year according to the U.S. Environmental Protection Agency's Toxic Release Inventory," including "known carcinogens such as formaldehyde, dioxin, acetaldehyde and chloroform". The plant also emits hydrogen sulfide into both the air, and the water, earning one creek the nickname "Stink Creek". Residents have complained about the plant's emissions since the 1990s, causing Georgia-Pacific to offer thousands of dollars to residents, in return for "signed release forms absolving the company of any responsibility for damages to the residents’ property — or their health."

In 2012, the Louisiana Environmental Action Network commissioned air-monitoring stations in Crossett that found "hydrogen sulfide levels were highest nearest the stream and that higher levels corresponded with greater and more severe symptoms among residents."

In November 2015, an EPA inspection "found 33 areas where Georgia-Pacific was noncompliant with federal laws and dozens of other areas of concern," including "several defective pieces of equipment that were allowing unidentified gases to escape into the atmosphere" and "filtrate tanks and storage tanks that were knowingly being vented into the atmosphere rather than through a controlled system, as required by the Clean Air Act."

=== Ouachita River ===
The Ouachita River begins in western Arkansas, upstream from Lake Ouachita, flows south and passes about 10 miles west of Crossett. In 2007, alarmed by the change of the river from "vibrant blue" at its source in western Arkansas, to a "dark coffee color" with a "foul stench", Cheryl Slavant began the Ouachita Riverkeeper organization to "restore and monitor the Ouachita River watershed".

However, Georgia-Pacific believes the "water treatment system is thorough, carefully monitored and in full compliance with the law," including the water treatment canal known as 'Stink Creek'. They referenced their permit from the Arkansas Department for Environmental Quality. However, an employee from Public Employees for Environmental Responsibility alleges that, because the water known as 'Stink Creek' is a natural body of water known as Coffee Creek, it is protected under the 1972 Clean Water Act. The United States Geological Survey maps seem to support this allegation, showing Coffee Creek originating inside the land that Georgia-Pacific would eventually own. However, the Clean Water Act only specifies that pollutants not "disrupt the activities in those waters, such as fishing, drinking and supporting animal life". Since the Arkansas Department for Environmental Quality found that the water affected by the pollutants does not have "fishable/swimmable or domestic water supply uses", the use of the water by Georgia-Pacific was not illegal.

However, a December 2007 Use Attainability Analysis (UAA) by the Environmental Protection Agency (EPA) found that “aside from the fish and macroinvertebrate communities using Coffee Creek and Mossy Lake, other wildlife live in or frequently contact the [Georgia-Pacific] effluent. Muskrat, beaver, nutria, turtles and ducks are known to use Coffee Creek and Mossy Lake, sometimes in very large numbers.” Relevantly, “the waters of Coffee Creek and Mossy Lake have the potential to support aquatic life indicative of streams in the ecoregion.” In response, Georgia-Pacific accused the EPA of "acting without its knowledge and demanding the opportunity to redo the study using a contractor of its choosing," causing the UAA to be discarded.

=== Ouachita Riverkeeper ===
After a phone call from citizens in Crossett, who believed that the Georgia-Pacific Paper Mill was the source of much of Ouachita River pollution, Cheryl Slavant helped organize Crossett Concerned Citizens for Environmental Justice. Members included Baptist pastor David Bouie, who features in the documentary.

In May 2016, "the Ouachita Riverkeeper and Louisiana Environmental Action Network filed petitions with the EPA under Title VI of the 1964 Civil Rights Act demanding that it take action against the plant; they argue that its waste disposal disproportionately affects nearby African-American neighborhoods" with help from the Tulane Environmental Law Clinic.

The Ouachita Riverkeeper organization currently lists Georgia-Pacific Paper Mill in Crossett as its main environmental threat to its mission for releasing "toxic chemicals, carcinogens, and toxic metals."

== Reception ==
The film opened at the Mill Valley Film Festival. Company Town has received positive responses from critics. It received an 83% rating on Rotten Tomatoes.

The Los Angeles Times called the film "powerful", noting that "Although the movie... could use some second-half tightening and a bit more objectivity (Georgia-Pacific and Koch Industries did not comment in the film), it remains a vital, eye-opening portrait."

The Hollywood Reporter wrote that the film paints the EPA as "incapable of stopping flagrant polluters even when a community and journalists did its investigations," and "will add to the case files of industry-vs.-America crime-fighting". However, "the film would be well served by some objective third-party input and hard stats: Kottke-Masocco and Sardarian have mostly offered us (horrific) anecdotal evidence, along with general discussion of Koch Industries' efforts to quash regulation"

Ben Kenisberg of the New York Times wrote that the film "feels fueled by pure desperation" and the "rudimentary qualities of the filmmaking... somehow add to its urgency." Kenisberg comments that "staff members from the Environmental Protection Agency... do not appear overly concerned by the seriousness of the complaints."

== See also ==
- Koch Brothers Exposed
- Dark Money
- Citizen Koch
