= Doyle McManus =

American journalist

- Born: Doyle Daniel McManus; May 5, 1953 (age 73); San Francisco, California
- Occupations: journalist and author
- Notable credit(s): Los Angeles Times, PBS's Washington Week, CBS's Face the Nation, NPR's Weekend Edition
- Spouse: Paula Copeland McManus
- Children: 3

Doyle McManus (born May 5, 1953) is an American journalist, columnist (for the Los Angeles Times), who appears often on Public Broadcasting Service's Washington Week.

== Early life ==
Doyle Daniel McManus is the first-born son of Lois Doyle and James R. McManus, who was a San Francisco advertising executive. His younger brothers include Chris (born 1955) and Reed (born 1956).

He earned an A.B. in history at Stanford University in 1974, and was a Fulbright scholar at the University of Brussels.

== Career ==
As an undergraduate, McManus worked on the Stanford Daily.

He was a foreign correspondent for three years at the United Press International, beginning in Brussels.

He joined the Los Angeles Times in 1978, reporting from Los Angeles, the Middle East, Central America, New York. He transferred to the Times's Washington, D.C., bureau in 1983, where he covered the U.S. State Department, and White House. He succeeded Jack Nelson as bureau chief in 1996. After thirteen years as bureau chief, he reportedly told colleagues that he had "long ago asked for a new assignment." In November 2008, the financially troubled Tribune Company made him a columnist when it closed the Los Angeles Times' bureau in favor of a single Washington bureau for all its newspapers.

Mr. McManus has written for Foreign Policy, Time, Sports Illustrated, and the London Daily Express. He appears regularly on the PBS commentary program Washington Week.

He has covered every presidential election since 1984.

In January 2008, he was a moderator at Hillary Clinton and Barack Obama's presidential primary debate in Los Angeles.

== Memberships and awards ==
- Committee to Protect Journalists
- Council on Foreign Relations
- Hoover Institution William and Barbara Edwards Media Fellow April 19–24, 2004
- Reporters Committee for Freedom of the Press Steering Committee
- Phi Beta Kappa Society
- Advisory Board of the Freeman Spogli Institute for International Studies at Stanford
- Board of Visitors of the Philip Merrill College of Journalism at the University of Maryland, College Park
- Stanford's board of trustees, from 1988 to 1993
- National Press Club's Edwin Hood Award (four times) (2004 for articles on the U.S. occupation of Iraq)
- Georgetown University's Weintal Prize

== Bibliography ==
- Wright, Robin; Doyle McManus (1991-12-03). Flashpoints: Promise and Peril in a New World. New York: Alfred A. Knopf. ISBN 978-0-679-40708-9.
- Mayer, Jane; Doyle McManus (1988). Landslide: The Unmaking of the President, 1984–1988. Boston, Massachusetts: Houghton Mifflin Company. ISBN 978-0-395-45185-4.
- McManus, Doyle (1981). Free at Last, the Complete Story of the Hostages' 444-Day Ordeal and the Secret Negotiations to Set Them Free (1st ed.). New York: Signet Books. ISBN 978-0-451-11054-1.

== Personal ==
McManus and his wife reside in Bethesda, Maryland.
