= Koch Brothers Exposed =

- Directed by: Robert Greenwald
- Produced by: Robert Greenwald; Jim Miller
- Starring: Bernie Sanders; Van Jones; Bill McKibben; Katrina vanden Heuvel; Lawrence Lessig; Benjamin Todd Jealous; Adele Stan; Lee Fang; John Nichols; Gerry Connolly
- Edited by: Joseph Suzuki
- Production company: Brave New Films
- Release date: May 8, 2012
- Running time: 60 min
- Country: United States
- Language: English

Koch Brothers Exposed is a 2012 U.S. documentary, compiled by filmmaker Robert Greenwald from a viral video campaign produced by Brave New Films, about the political activities of the Koch brothers.

== Background ==
Robert Greenwald is an American filmmaker, who in the early 2000s turned toward making issues-oriented documentary films and founded Brave New Films, a liberal media company which publishes viral documentary campaigns, including the one from which this film was compiled. The 60-minute Koch Brothers Exposed documentary began as a series of 13 two- to twelve-minute viral videos intended to portray David and Charles Koch's negative impact on a variety of aspects of American life. The billionaire Koch Brothers have been described as "the poster boys of the 1 percent." Their conglomerate, Koch Industries, is one of the largest private firms in the nation, with estimated annual revenues in the range of $100 billion. Critics argue that the extraordinary wealth and overwhelming political influence of the Koch brothers harms the environment, education, campaign finance, and labor rights.

== Synopsis ==
The opening introduction alleges that Fred C. Koch amassed his fortune by working for Joseph Stalin and that the Koch brothers used their inherited wealth to "wage a systematic attack on American values".

In a campaign video, US Senator Bernie Sanders asserts that the Koch brothers fund think tank position papers, media pundits and politicians to promote three distorted perceptions: the need to raise the age of retirement, the notion that the social security system is going bankrupt, and the idea that social security should be privatized. Members of the general public compare and contrast their own lifestyles, supported by social security, with those of the Koch brothers. Subsequently, they and others attempt to question the brothers about policies they are alleged to support, such as home foreclosures, pollution and union busting,

Journalist Adele Stan describes Americans for Prosperity as a "front group" which acts as "the boots on the ground for enforcing the agenda put forward by David Koch". People involved in the Wake County Public School System, in a section from campaign video, allege that AFP backed school board candidates sought to re-segregate schools by opposing forced bussing and supporting neighbourhood schools with the aim of destroying the public school system. The Nation editor Katrina vanden Heuvel and others, in a section from campaign video, assert that Koch Foundation Grants with over 115 colleges and universities are drawn up to allow the brothers to have excessive control over recruitment, syllabus design, publishing and research with the aim of exposing students exclusively to their ideology and point of view.

Law Professor Lawrence Lessig says the Koch brothers are "buying our democracy ... getting Republicans elected and buying their votes on public policy issues cheap, preventing environmental rules from being set and other damaging results contrary to government "by the people." He joins investigative blogger Lee Fang and others alleging that Koch brothers use financial influence over politician such as Representative Fred Upton and Governor Scott Walker to kill environmental regulation and bust trade unions. NAACP President Benjamin Todd Jealous and others, in a section from campaign video further allege that the Koch supported American Legislative Exchange Council's Voter ID Bill, being adopted at state level across the nation, is actually intended to disenfranchise African American, Latino, elderly, young and disabled voters. Environmentalists Bill McKibben and Van Jones return to the environment, with particular reference to the Keystone Pipeline as the reason for this alleged distortion of democracy. Residents of the Penn Rd neighbourhood in Crossett, Arkansas, in a section from a campaign video, propose that the high incidence of cancer in their community is the result of environmental pollution from the nearby Koch Industries owned Georgia-Pacific plant.

A brief epilogue featuring news footage from anti-Koch protests around the country calls for unity in exposing the Koch brothers. As in previous Brave New Films documentaries, footage over the closing credit shows members of the production team unsuccessfully attempting to contact the Koch Brothers for comment on the film and the issues raised.

== Allegations ==
- Alleged efforts to gut Social Security. Spending more than $28 million, the Kochs have funded hundreds of reports, commentaries and books asserting that Social Security is on the brink of collapse.
- Alleged attempts at re-segregation. The film alleges Koch-funded efforts to remake a North Carolina school district's diversity policy, which some see as effectively re-segregating the schools.
- Alleged voter suppression. Koch money has supported voter ID laws in 38 states. These laws are billed as a way to avoid voter fraud, but the film argues that they are actually intended to make it more difficult for Democrats to vote.
- Keystone XL. The Kochs use their influence to attempt to sway legislation regarding the Keystone XL pipeline. Koch Industries has a significant financial interest in this oil and gas project.
- Cancer in Crosset. It has been alleged that a Koch paper plant pollutes the air and water of a community in Arkansas. The film explores a link with a cancer cluster in the small African-American community.
- Higher Education. The Kochs give millions of dollars to universities, which the film alleges are given with the stipulation that the schools must hire Koch-sympathetic professors.

== Distribution ==
The film had a limited theatrical release in 2012. It was subsequently made available via cable and satellite to 50 million homes. Brave New Films also partnered with 40 other liberal organizations to sponsor screenings in homes, churches and community groups throughout the country.

On May 20, 2014, Brave New Films re-released Koch Brothers Exposed with new features, interviews and additional footage.

== Reception ==
Rolling Stone called the Koch Brothers Exposed "scrappy and low-budget, but effective all the same." On the website TopDocumentaryFilms.com, it earned 7.86 stars out of 10 from 96 viewers. Progressive media embraced it, saying it is "a muckraking tour de force that takes no prisoners," and "an illuminating and very timely film- and it rocks."

== Koch Industry response ==
The Kochs took issue with the film's portrayal of their activities. On KochFacts.com, their website launched to rebut perceived inaccurate media allegations, they call Robert Greenwald "maliciously false and misleading." Even before the release of the film, they stated, "we are certain his video about Koch will contain outright lies, distortions of our true record, and misstatements of fact." Later, they issued a statement rebutting four of the film's claims and said the film is "a desperate attempt by an obscure video maker to make money off of the orchestrated partisan political attacks against Koch."

The statement by Koch published ahead of the film's release in March 2012 correctly predicted that the film would include allegations "that Koch is behind various voter ID laws passed by state legislatures ... and that Koch was the impetus for some Wake County, North Carolina school board decisions [on racial resegregation] ..." The statement refuted both of these claims, citing two separate earlier statements from 2011 which called these claims made in Greenwald's other films and viral videos "flatly untrue" and an "ugly and baseless racial charge", respectively.

Regarding the voter ID laws, the statement claims "The reality is that, for many years, Koch has created initiatives to increase voter registration, supported a long list of civic organizations that do the same, worked with a wide variety of minority groups to build civic engagement and foster entrepreneurship, and held an unwavering belief that all citizens should exercise the right to vote and hold government accountable", later continuing "... Koch has no formal position and has undertaken no advocacy or lobbying on the voter ID issue."

Citing articles in Newsweek and The Washington Post which it says debunk the allegations of Koch's involvement with the Wake County school board issue, the second statement asserted "No candidate in the Wake County School Board election received funds or support from any Koch family member or the company's political action committee, KochPAC". Quoting community activist Joey Stansbury, Newsweek offered the explanation that "What's being portrayed in the larger media is erroneous. It was disaffected, disillusioned parents in the community", who sought to rectify the "logistical problems and inequities caused by the busing program", and that outside groups only played a minor role in the process.

Responding to the claims that high incidence of cancer in Crossett is attributable to the waste products generated and dispersed by the Georgia-Pacific mill operating nearby, a third statement by Koch expresses sympathy for the sufferers, while rejecting all claims that the mill's operation is connected to their plight. The statement points out, among several other criticisms of the film's coverage of the topic, that the primary source's claims against the company "were rejected as part of a class-action" before being "voluntarily withdrawn" in 2011, adding, "There is simply no basis, factual or legal, for his assertions." The statement reiterates in various ways that the mills's "emissions are approved and monitored based on both state and federal regulatory permits." The later statement issued by Koch after the film's release alleged further that "... the individuals in Mr. Greenwald's video have undisclosed, ulterior financial or other motives in attacking us; and that the allegations about us have been reviewed and dismissed by the regulators in the past."

== Film re-release ==
On May 20, 2014 Robert Greenwald and Brave New Films re-released Koch Brothers Exposed. The film continues where the original film left off, by looking into how the Koch Brothers sponsored the decision in Citizens United v. FEC, and how they have used it to broaden their hold on American politics.

The new edition features interviews with Senator Harry Reid, who has been increasingly concerned about the Kochs and their excessive influence on Congress.

The film also looks at how Koch money has funded efforts to reduce the minimum wage in 25 states. To put this in context, the film contains the story of Erica Johnson, a working single mother from Los Angeles trying to get by on minimum wage—often scraping by with nickels earned from collecting recycling. The film also asserts that David H. Koch and Charles Koch are worth an estimated $82 billion in 2014 and believe that the minimum wage creates a culture of dependency.

== See also ==
- Citizen Koch
- Dark Money
- Company Town
