= Jane Mayer =

American journalist

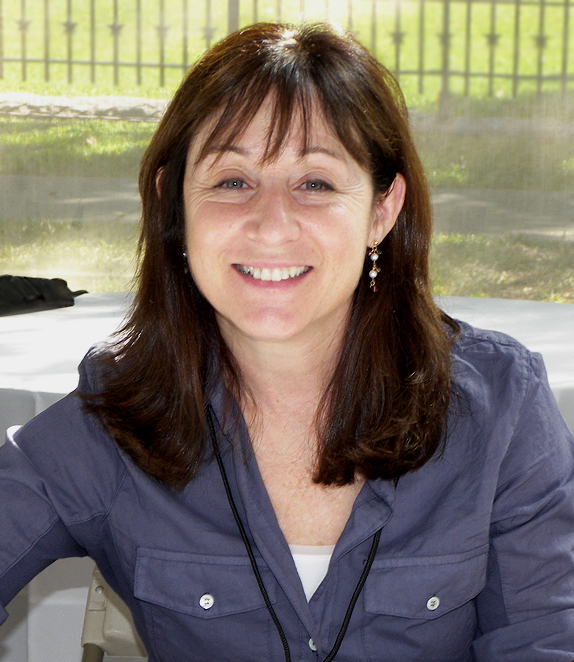
- Mayer in 2008
- Born: Jane Meredith Mayer; 1955 (age 70–71); New York City, U.S.
- Education: Yale University (BA)
- Occupations: Journalist, author
- Spouse: William B. Hamilton (m. 1992)
- Children: 1
- Parent(s): Meredith Nevins Meyer; William Mayer
- Family: Allan Nevins (grandfather); Emanuel Lehman (great-great grandfather)

Jane Meredith Mayer (born 1955) is an American investigative journalist who has been a staff writer for The New Yorker since 1995. She has written for the publication about money in politics; government prosecution of whistleblowers; the United States Predator drone program; Donald Trump's ghostwriter, Tony Schwartz; and Trump's financial backer, Robert Mercer. In 2016, Mayer's book Dark Money—in which she investigated the history of the conservative fundraising Koch brothers—was published to critical acclaim.

== Early life and education ==
Mayer was born in New York City. Her mother, Meredith (née Nevins), is a painter, print-maker and former president of the Manhattan Graphics Center. Her father, William Mayer, was a composer. Her paternal great-great-grandfather was Emanuel Lehman, one of the founders of Lehman Brothers. Her maternal grandparents were Mary Fleming (Richardson) and Allan Nevins, a historian and John D. Rockefeller Jr.'s authorized biographer.

Mayer attended two private non-secondary schools: Fieldston, in the northwest area of the Bronx borough of New York City; and—as an exchange student in 1972-1973—Bedales, a boarding school in the village of Steep, Hampshire, England.

A 1977 magna cum laude graduate of Yale University, she was elected to Phi Beta Kappa and served as senior editor of the Yale Daily News and as campus stringer for Time magazine..

== Career ==
Mayer began her career as a journalist in Vermont writing for two small weekly papers, The Weathersfield Weekly and The Black River Tribune, before moving to the daily Rutland Herald. She worked as a metropolitan reporter for the now-defunct Washington Star, and in 1982 joined The Wall Street Journal, where she worked for 12 years. She was the first woman at the WSJ to be named White House correspondent, and subsequently, senior writer and front page editor.

She served as a war correspondent and foreign correspondent for the Journal, where she reported on the bombing of the American barracks in Beirut, the Persian Gulf War, the fall of the Berlin Wall, and the last days of Communism in the former Soviet Union. Mayer also contributes to the New York Review of Books, The Washington Post, the Los Angeles Times, and the American Prospect.

Mayer has co-authored two books: Strange Justice: The Selling of Clarence Thomas (1994) (co-authored with Jill Abramson), a study of the nomination and appointment of Clarence Thomas to the U.S. Supreme Court; and Landslide: The Unmaking of the President, 1984–1988 (1989; co-authored with Doyle McManus), an account of Ronald Reagan's second term in the White House. Strange Justice was adapted as a 1999 Showtime television movie of the same name, starring Delroy Lindo, Mandy Patinkin, and Regina Taylor. Strange Justice was a finalist for the 1994 National Book Award for Nonfiction, and both books were finalists for the National Book Critics Circle Award.

Time magazine said of Strange Justice: "Its portrait of Thomas as an id suffering in the role of a Republican superego is more detailed and convincing than anything that has appeared so far." Of Landslide, The New York Times Washington correspondent Steven V. Roberts said, "This is clearly a reporter's book, full of rich anecdote and telling detail.... I am impressed with the amount of inside information collected here."

In an Elle magazine interview, Mayer said about her next article, "I'm focusing broadly on stories about abuses of power, threats to democracy, and corruption."

=== The Dark Side ===
Mayer's third nonfiction book, The Dark Side: The Inside Story of How the War on Terror Turned into a War on American Ideals (2008), addresses the origins, legal justifications, and possible war crimes liability of the use of enhanced interrogation techniques (commonly considered torture) on detainees and the subsequent deaths of detainees, sometimes victims of mistaken identity, under such interrogation by the CIA and DOD. The roles of Dick Cheney and attorneys David Addington and John Yoo in providing cover for the grisly procedures were prominent. The book was a finalist for the National Book Awards.

In her New York Times review of The Dark Side, Jennifer Schuessler described the book as "the most vivid and comprehensive account we have so far of how a government founded on checks and balances and respect for individual rights could have been turned against those ideals." The Times subsequently named The Dark Side one of its ten most notable books of the year.

Military and diplomatic historian Colonel Andrew J. Bacevich, reviewing the book in The Washington Post, wrote: "[Mayer's] achievement lies less in bringing new revelations to light than in weaving into a comprehensive narrative a story revealed elsewhere in bits and pieces." Washington Post reporter Joby Warrick reported that Mayer's book revealed that a Central Intelligence Agency (CIA) analyst warned the Bush administration that "up to a third of the detainees at Guantanamo Bay may have been imprisoned by mistake." The administration ignored the warning and insisted that all were enemy combatants.

In a story appearing the same day in The New York Times, reporter Scott Shane reported Mayer's book as disclosing International Committee of the Red Cross officials had concluded in a secret report in 2007: "the Central Intelligence Agency's interrogation methods for high-level Qaeda prisoners constituted torture and could make the Bush administration officials who approved them guilty of war crimes." Mayer said of her book: "I see myself more as a reporter than as an advocate."

=== Civil liberties ===
Mayer covered the Obama administration's prosecution of whistleblowers with an article about former National Security Agency (NSA) official Thomas Drake. Mayer wrote that despite Obama's campaign promises of transparency, his administration "has pursued leak prosecutions with a surprising relentlessness." She won the Polk Award for the article, and the judges said her article helped expose "prosecutorial excess" and "helped lead to all major charges against Drake being dropped."

=== Drones ===
In 2009, Mayer covered the Obama administration's use of drones. "The number of drone strikes has risen dramatically since Obama became President", she wrote. Her article described errors, ethical concerns, and potential unintended consequences in the increased use of drone strikes.

=== Money in politics ===
Mayer has written about money in politics for many years, covering and criticizing both liberals and conservatives. In 1997, she wrote an article about "dubious Democratic Party fundraising tactics leading to the 1996 election." The article described how the Clinton campaign "marketed the prestige and glamour of the Presidency as never before."

In 2004, she wrote an article on George Soros and other activist billionaires who sought "to use their fortunes to engineer the defeat of President George W. Bush in the 2004 election." The article described Soros's "extreme measures" and how his "outsized financial role in the election" had "stirred alarm".

In 2010, Mayer published an article about the political activities of the Koch brothers, describing their "war against Obama" and funding of the Tea Party and nonprofit organizations that sought to block liberal policy proposals and defeat Democratic candidates. The article was a finalist for the 2011 National Magazine Awards.

In 2011, Mayer reported on retail sales millionaire Art Pope's dominant spending in North Carolina politics. It documented his extraordinarily successful efforts as a Koch brothers ally, who held seats on the boards of their Americans for Prosperity and Citizens for a Sound Economy organizations, to target both Democrats and moderate Republican state legislators. It predicted the redistricting-generated loss of Democratic congressional delegation seats. Her article won a Toner Prize for Excellence in Political Reporting, and the judges called it "the kind of journalism that strengthens democracy and shows the value of a free press." Mark Bauerlein, writing in the Chronicle of Higher Education, was critical of the piece, saying the article was "a tendentious, poorly-researched, and weakly argued bit of journalism" and that "Pope never gets a fair shake." In response to criticism, Mayer supplemented her article with a blog entry pointing out that, despite Pope's claims that he was "not an heir", his "political career was launched" by more than $300,000 from his parents.

In 2012, Mayer wrote an article about President Obama's efforts to raise money from liberal billionaires and his campaign's decision to flip-flop and encourage fundraising from super PACs.

Following the 2016 election cycle, Mayer covered the exertion of the considerable influence of former Democratic strategist and pollster Patrick Caddell, in his capacity as advisor to reclusive contributor Robert Mercer for The New Yorker. Hedge fund director Mercer, joined in his efforts by his daughter Rebekah, has been an increasingly important source of substantial funding for right-wing campaigns, including the successful candidacy of Donald Trump.

=== Dark Money ===
In 2016, Doubleday published Mayer's fourth book, Dark Money, which became an instant national best-seller. The New York Times named it one of the year's ten best books. The New York Review of Books described it as "absolutely necessary reading for anyone who wants to make sense of our politics", and Esquire called Mayer "quite simply one of the very few, utterly invaluable journalists this country has". In interviews about her book, Mayer said approximately six investigators, led by former New York Police Commissioner Howard Safir, had been hired by the industrialist Koch brothers in an effort to try to dig up dirt in order to smear her reputation, as well as accusations of plagiarism being leveled against her. She responded by publicly airing those intimidation tactics, effectively debunking the smear campaign. Dark Money won the 2017 Helen Bernstein Award, and was a finalist for the PEN Jean Stein Prize, the Los Angeles Times Book Prize and the J. Anthony Lukas Book Prize.

=== Eric Schneiderman resignation ===
On May 7, 2018, within hours of publication of an article Mayer co-wrote with Ronan Farrow in The New Yorker, New York State Attorney General Eric Schneiderman resigned, effective May 8, 2018. During his term in office, he had been accused of physical abuse by at least four women with whom he had been romantically involved and habitually abusing alcohol and prescription drugs. Mayer and Farrow had reported that they had confirmed the women's allegations both with photographs of contusions, as well as with statements from friends with whom the alleged victims had confided subsequent to the claimed assaults. Though he denied the allegations, Schneiderman stated he resigned because they "effectively prevent me from leading the office's work". Governor Andrew Cuomo assigned a special prosecutor to investigate the filing of possible criminal charges against Schneiderman.

=== Appearances ===
Mayer has appeared as a guest on the Charlie Rose Show, as well as on the Late Show with David Letterman. She was also a guest on the Bill Moyers Journal show on PBS in 2008, and appeared as a guest on PBS Tavis Smiley show on August 7, 2008, to discuss her book The Dark Side, which had just made The New York Times Best Seller list. She appeared as a guest on Comedy Central's The Colbert Report on August 12, 2008.

On January 26, 2009, Mayer was interviewed at the Yale Law School Law and Media lecture series by Linda Greenhouse, Distinguished Journalist in Residence, and Emily Bazelon, Truman Capote Fellow in Creative Writing. In October 2008, Mayer participated in a panel discussion of journalists at the Nieman Foundation for Journalism at Harvard University, devoted to the media's coverage of the Iraq War. That same month Mayer participated as a panelist in a discussion of the same subject at the Newseum in Washington, D.C.

Although not a personal appearance by Mayer, the FOX show 24 had a minor character in its seventh season named Blaine Mayer. The character was named after Jane Mayer, who wrote, ""Well, there's kind of a balancing sensation. The elevation to the U.S. Senate is a nice start to the year, but the sex change is a bit disappointing, since if I have to be male, I was hoping for a younger, more fit body, and a better head of hair. It does however fulfill one of my greatest fantasies, which is that I have long had subpoena envy."

Mayer has appeared frequently on Free Speech TV's Democracy Now! program. On February 17, 2016, she was interviewed by American University journalism professor Charles Lewis, the founder of the Center for Public Integrity, at a public discussion of her career and Dark Money that was broadcast on C-SPAN.

== Awards and honors ==
Mayer was awarded the 2008 John Chancellor Award for Excellence in Journalism for her investigative report leading to her book The Dark Side. The Award, presented annually by the Columbia University Graduate School of Journalism, is given to reporters for "distinguished cumulative accomplishments." In presenting the award, Nicholas Lemann, dean of the journalism school and one of the nine members of the award committee, noted that Mayer and her fellow winner, Andrew C. Revkin (science reporter for The New York Times) "set the gold standard for journalists, and we have benefited tremendously from their dedication and hard work." She also has won the Ridenhour Book Prize and the New York Public Library's Helen Bernstein Book Award for Excellence in Journalism.

Mayer was a finalist in the National Magazine Awards for 2007 for her nonfiction piece in The New Yorker entitled The Black Sites, which was subsequently collected in The Best American Magazine Writing 2008, published by Columbia University Press, and edited by Jacob Weisberg.

In 2008, Mayer was awarded a Guggenheim Fellowship in connection with her work on her third book, The Dark Side. In 2009, Mayer was awarded the Hillman Prize, the Shorenstein Center's Goldsmith Book Prize for trade book of the year, and the J. Anthony Lukas Book Prize for The Dark Side.

She received the Edward Weinthal Award from Georgetown University in 2009 and the James Aronson Award for Social Justice Journalism in 2010.

Mayer was awarded the George Polk Award for Magazine Reporting in 2011 for her investigative reporting on the relentless United States Department of Justice prosecution of NSA whistleblower Thomas Andrews Drake. Mayer's article in The New Yorker told the story of how Drake faced up to 35 years in federal prison for communicating non-classified information about an NSA surveillance program known as "Trailblazer" to Baltimore Sun reporter Siobahn Gorman, who wrote a prize-winning article about it. Drake had been arrested after an investigation meant to identify the source for the Pulitzer Prize-winning 2005 New York Times report on warrantless wiretapping. Neither Drake nor any other NSA employee had actually been the story's source. After Mayer's story was published, the prosecution dismissed all 10 felony charges against Drake. He pleaded guilty to one misdemeanor count of violating rules regarding the retention of classified materials.

In 2012, Mayer received the Toner Prize for Excellence in Political Reporting for her coverage of North Carolina state politics.

In 2020, Mayer was awarded the Mirror Award for the Best Single Article/Story for her New Yorker article on detailing the relationship between Fox News and the White house.

== Personal life ==
Mayer married William B. Hamilton, also a journalist, in 1992. Hamilton is the former national editor at The Washington Post and former Washington editor for The New York Times. Hamilton's father was a foreign correspondent and U.N. bureau chief for The New York Times and his grandfather was the editor and publisher of The Augusta (Georgia) Chronicle and a member of the Democratic National Committee.

Their daughter, Katherine Hamilton, was the 2015 winner of the Truman Scholarship from Washington, D.C.

Mayer is a member of the American Academy of Arts and Sciences and the American Philosophical Society.

== Bibliography ==
- Mayer, Jane; McManus, Doyle (1989). Landslide: The Unmaking of the President, 1984–1988.
- Mayer, Jane; Abramson, Jill (1994). Strange Justice: The Selling of Clarence Thomas.
- Mayer, Jane (2008). The Dark Side: The Inside Story of How the War on Terror Turned into a War on American Ideals.
- Mayer, Jane (2016). Dark Money: The Hidden History of the Billionaires Behind the Rise of the Radical Right. Doubleday. ISBN 9780385535595.

== See also ==
- New Yorkers in journalism
