= List of The Daily Show episodes (2008) =

- No. of episodes: 160

Release
- Original network: Comedy Central

Season chronology
- ← Previous; 2007 episodes Next → 2009 episodes

This is a list of episodes for The Daily Show with Jon Stewart in 2008.

== 2008 ==
=== January ===
Date	Guest	Promotion
January 7	Ronald Seeber	
January 8	David Frum	Comeback: Conservatism That Can Win Again
January 9	John Zogby	
January 10	Lou Dobbs	Independents Day: Awakening the American Spirit
January 14	Fareed Zakaria	
January 15	John Bolton	Surrender Is Not An Option
January 16	Jonah Goldberg	Liberal Fascism: The Secret History of the American Left, From Mussolini to the Politics of Meaning
January 17	Allen Raymond	How To Rig an Election: Confessions of a Republican Operative
January 21	Jon Meacham	
January 22	Jim Wallis	The Great Awakening
January 23	P. J. O'Rourke	On the Wealth of Nations
January 24	Gerri Willis	Open House
January 28	Phil Simms	The NFL on CBS
January 29	Doris Kearns Goodwin	
January 30	Peggy Noonan	
January 31	Karen Tumulty	

=== February ===
Date	Guest	Promotion
February 4	Stephen Colbert	The Colbert Report (Who Made Huckabee?)
February 4	Conan O'Brien	Late Night with Conan O'Brien (Who Made Huckabee?)
February 4	Tim Gunn	Project Runway
February 5	Chris Wallace	Fox News Sunday
February 6	Tom Brokaw	Boom! - Voices of the Sixties - Personal Reflections on the '60s and Today
February 7	Laton McCartney	The Teapot Dome Scandal
February 11	Philip Shenon	The Commission: The Uncensored History of the 9/11 Investigation
February 12	Bill Kristol	
February 13	Mark Siegel	Benazir Bhutto: Reconciliation: Islam, Democracy and the West
February 14	Lee Siegel	Against the Machine: Being Human in the Age of the Electronic Mob
February 26	Madeleine Albright	Memo to the President Elect: How We Can Restore America's Reputation and Leadership
February 27	Allen Guelzo	Lincoln and Douglas: The Debates that Defined America
February 28	Brian Williams	NBC Nightly News

=== March ===
Date	Guest	Promotion
March 3	Hillary Clinton	
March 4	Ralph Nader	The Seventeen Traditions
March 5	Martin Fletcher	Breaking News
March 6	Tom Daschle	Critical: What We Can Do About The Health-Care Crisis
March 10	Lt. Gen. William B. Caldwell	
March 11	Grover G. Norquist	Leave Us Alone: Getting the Government's Hands Off Our Money, Our Guns, Our Lives
March 12	Ronald Kessler	The Terrorist Watch: Inside the Desperate Race to Stop the Next Attack
March 13	Dana Perino	
March 17	Brian Fagan	The Great Warming: Climate Change and the Rise and Fall of Civilizations
March 18	Jeffrey Sachs	Common Wealth: Economics for a Crowded Planet
March 19	Arlen Specter	Never Give In: Battling Cancer in the Senate
March 20	Alex Kingsbury	U.S. News & World Report
March 31	Chuck Hagel	America: Our Next Chapter

=== April ===
Date	Guest	Promotion
April 1	Simon LeVay	When Science Goes Wrong: Twelve Tales from the Dark Side of Discovery
April 2	William Safire	Safire's Political Dictionary
April 3	George Clooney	Leatherheads
April 7	Nathan Lane	November
April 8	Cokie Roberts	Ladies Of Liberty
April 9	Steve Coll	The Bin Ladens
April 10	Aram Roston	The Man Who Pushed America To War
April 14	Judd Apatow	Forgetting Sarah Marshall
April 15	Jack Goldsmith	The Terror Presidency: Law and Judgment Inside the Bush Administration
April 16	Peter Steinfels	
April 17	Uma Thurman	The Life Before Her Eyes
April 21	Barack Obama	
April 22	John Waters	Cry-Baby
April 23	Howard Fineman	The Thirteen American Arguments
April 24	Colin Firth	Then She Found Me
April 28	President Jimmy Carter	A Remarkable Mother
April 29	Newt Gingrich	Days Of Infamy
April 30	Robert Schlesinger	White House Ghosts: Presidents and Their Speechwriters

=== May ===
Date	Guest	Promotion
May 1	Howard Dean	
May 5	Harry Reid	The Good Fight: Hard lessons from Searchlight to Washington
May 6	Fareed Zakaria	The Post-American World
May 7	John McCain	
May 8	David D. Perlmutter	Blog Wars
May 12	Douglas J. Feith	War and Decision: Inside the Pentagon at the Dawn of the War on Terrorism
May 13	Bill Moyers	Moyers on Democracy
May 14	John Harwood	Pennsylvania Avenue: Profiles In Backroom Power
May 15	Denis Leary	Recount, Rescue Me
May 27	Matt Taibbi	The Great Derangement
May 28	Fred Burton	Ghost
May 29	Richard A. Clarke	Your Government Failed You

=== June ===
Date	Guest	Promotion
June 2	Scott McClellan	What Happened
June 3	David Sedaris	When You Are Engulfed in Flames
June 4	Barbara Walters	Audition
June 5	Adam Sandler	You Don't Mess with the Zohan
June 9	Jim Webb	A Time to Fight: Reclaiming a Fair and Just America
June 10	Ralph Reed	Dark Horse
June 11	Rick Shenkman	Just How Stupid Are We?
June 12	Richard Engel	War Journal: My Five Years in Iraq
June 16	David Iglesias	In Justice: Inside the Scandal That Rocked the Bush Administration
June 17	Lara Logan	
June 18	Steve Carell	Get Smart
June 19	Mike Myers	The Love Guru
June 23	James McAvoy	Wanted
June 24	James Harding	Alpha Dogs: The Americans Who Turned Political Spin into a Global Business
June 25	Coldplay	Viva la Vida or Death and All His Friends
June 26	Ted Koppel	Koppel on Discovery: The People's Republic of Capitalism

=== July ===
Date	Guest	Promotion
July 14	Andrew Ward	The Slaves War: The Civil War in the Words of Former Slaves
July 15	Pierce Brosnan	Mamma Mia!
July 16	Kenneth Pollack	A Path Out of the Desert: A Grand Strategy for America in the Middle East
July 17	Maggie Gyllenhaal	The Dark Knight
July 21	Richard Bitner	Confessions of a Subprime Lender: An Insider's Tale of Greed, Fraud, and Ignorance
July 22	Will Ferrell and John C. Reilly	Step Brothers
July 23	T.J. English	Havana Nocturne: How the Mob Owned Cuba and Then Lost It to the Revolution
July 24	Geo Beach	History Channel: Tougher In Alaska
July 28	Rep. Nancy Pelosi	Know Your Power: A Message to America's Daughters
July 29	Bill Bishop	The Big Sort
July 30	Ben Wattenberg	Fighting Words
July 31	Brian Williams	

=== August ===
Date	Guest	Promotion
August 4	Dennis Hopper	Elegy
August 5	Seth Rogen	Pineapple Express
August 6	Chuck Schumer	Positively American: How the Democrats Can Win in 2008
August 7	David Gregory	
August 11	Ron Suskind	The Way of the World: A Story of Truth and Hope in an Age of Extremism
August 12	Mel Martinez	A Sense of Belonging
August 13	Philip P. Pan	Out of Mao's Shadow: The Struggle for the Soul of a New China
August 14	Ben Stiller	Tropic Thunder
August 26	Tim Kaine	
August 27	Howard Dean	
August 28	Evan Bayh	
August 29	(no guest)	

=== September ===
Date	Guest	Promotion
September 2	Brian Williams	NBC Nightly News
September 3	Newt Gingrich	Drill Here, Drill Now, Pay Less: A Handbook for Slashing Gas Prices and Solving Our Energy Crisis
September 4	Mike Huckabee	
September 5	(no guest)	
September 15	Barton Gellman	Angler: The Cheney Vice Presidency
September 16	Ricky Gervais	Ghost Town
September 17	Charlize Theron	Battle in Seattle
September 18	Tony Blair	
September 23	Bill Clinton	Clinton Global Initiative
September 24	Aaron Eckhart	Towelhead
September 25	Bob Schieffer	
September 29	Hooman Majd	The Ayatollah Begs to Differ: The Paradox of Modern Islam
September 30	Bill Maher	Religulous

=== October ===
Date	Guest	Promotion
October 1	Gideon Rose	
October 1	Peggy Noonan	Patriotic Grace: What It Is and Why We Need It Now
October 2	Clint Eastwood	Changeling
October 6	Tim Robbins	City of Ember
October 7	Sarah Vowell	The Wordy Shipmates
October 8	Michelle Obama	
October 9	Robert De Niro	What Just Happened
October 13	Amity Shlaes	The Forgotten Man: A New History of the Great Depression
October 14	Ari Fleischer	
October 15	Richard Lewis	Curb Your Enthusiasm
October 16	Robert Reich	Supercapitalism: The Transformation of Business, Democracy, and Everyday Life
October 20	Eugene Jarecki	The American Way of War
October 21	Christopher Buckley	Supreme Courtship
October 22	Tom Brokaw	Boom!
October 23	Jon Corzine	
October 27	Campbell Brown	CNN Election Center, Campbell Brown: No Bias, No Bull
October 28	Steve Martin	"Born Standing Up"
October 29	Barack Obama	2008 United States presidential election
October 30	Bill Kristol	The Weekly Standard

=== November ===
Date	Guest	Promotion
November 3	Doris Kearns Goodwin	
November 4	Indecision 2008 Live Election Night Special	
November 5	Chris Wallace	Fox News Sunday
November 6	Paul Rudd	Role Models
November 11	Thomas L. Friedman	Hot, Flat, and Crowded
November 12	T. Boone Pickens	The First Billion is the Hardest
November 13	Bill O'Reilly	A Bold Fresh Piece of Humanity
November 17	David Frost	Frost-Nixon: The Original Watergate Interview
November 18	Denis Leary	Why We Suck: A Feel Good Guide to Staying Fat, Loud, Lazy and Stupid
November 19	Jon Meacham	American Lion: Andrew Jackson in the White House
November 20	Richard Belzer	I Am Not A Cop

=== December ===
Date	Guest	Promotion
December 1	Anne Hathaway	Rachel Getting Married
December 2	Calvin Trillin	Deciding The Next Decider
December 3	Arianna Huffington	The Huffington Post Complete Guide to Blogging
December 4	Ron Howard	Frost/Nixon
December 8	Matthew Alexander	How to Break a Terrorist
December 9	Mike Huckabee	From Hope to Higher Ground: 12 Stops to Restoring America's Greatness
December 10	Don Rickles	Rickles' Book
December 11	Philip Seymour Hoffman	Doubt
