= The Strenuous Life =

1899 speech by Theodore Roosevelt

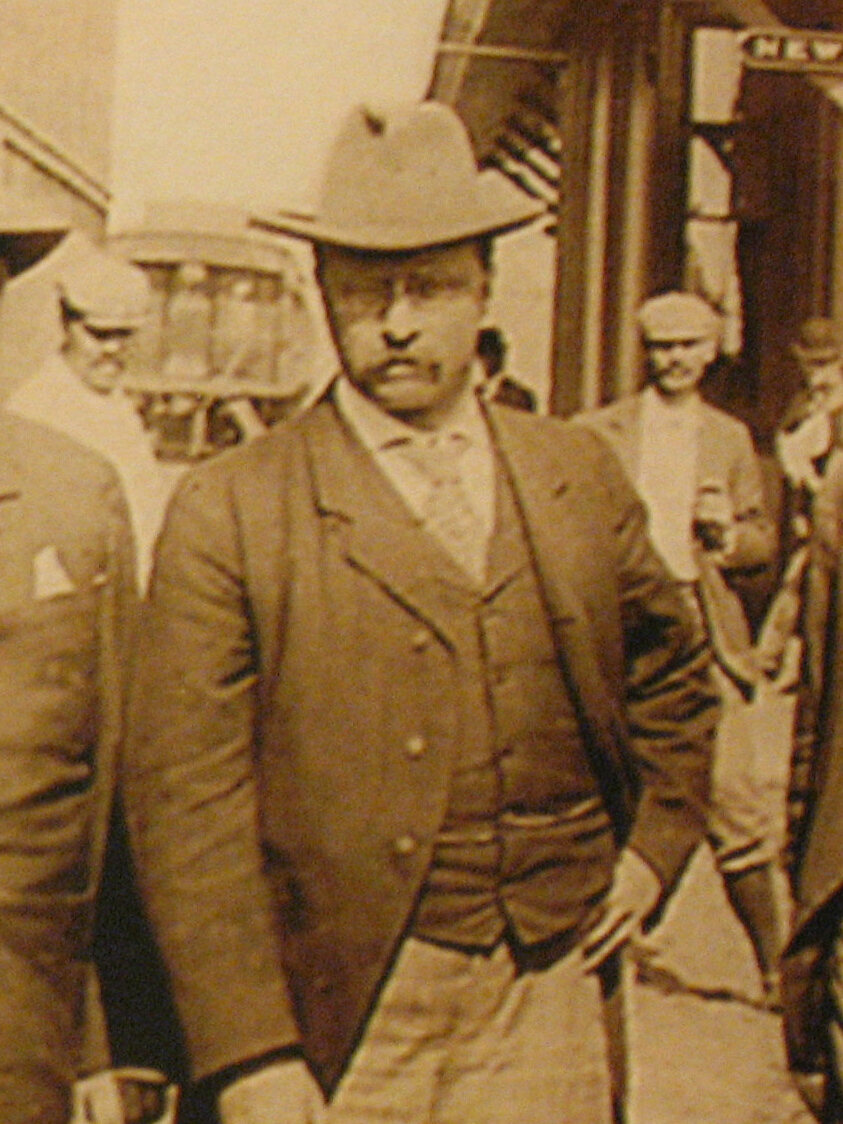
- Theodore Roosevelt in 1899, the same year he delivered the speech
- Date: April 10, 1899; 127 years ago
- Venue: Hamilton Club in Chicago, Illinois
- Location: 14-26 South Dearborn Street, Chicago, Illinois
- Theme: American imperialism, foreign policy, individual character, and civic duty
- Website: voicesofdemocracy.umd.edu/roosevelt-strenuous-life-1899-speech-text/

"The Strenuous Life" is a speech delivered by Theodore Roosevelt, then governor of New York and later the 26th president of the United States, in Chicago, Illinois, on April 10, 1899.

Delivered during the Philippine–American War (1899–1902), he argued that a life of ease, material comfort, and avoidance of struggle led to national and individual decay, and that Americans must instead embrace strenuous effort, hardship, and martial strife for both individual success and national greatness, while explicitly advocating for American imperialism. Defending the ongoing U.S. colonization of the Philippines asserting that Filipinos were "utterly unfit for self-government" and that without U.S. rule the islands would descend into "savage anarchy." He argued that if the United States failed to govern the Philippines, "some stronger and more manful race" would have to do so.

He condemned anti-imperialists who appealed to "liberty" and the "consent of the governed" as "timid" men who refused to "play the part of men." He argued for these ideals to be embraced by all Americans for the betterment of the nation. This speech became a foundational text of Roosevelt's political philosophy and a justification for U.S. overseas expansion in the early 20th century.

== The speech ==
Roosevelt states the main point of his speech in the opening remarks:

I wish to preach, not the doctrine of ignoble ease, but the doctrine of the strenuous life, the life of toil and effort, of labor and strife; to preach that highest form of success which comes, not to the man who desires mere easy peace, but to the man who does not shrink from danger, from hardship, or from bitter toil, and who out of these wins the splendid ultimate triumph.

An individual who puts great effort into his work and is not lazy, he claims, will be a success. It is the duty of someone who does not engage in manual labor for a living to devote themself to the arts or sciences. He uses the citizens of Chicago and Illinois as examples of people who embody such a spirit. Those who do not embrace the strenuous life, however, do not live meaningful lives.

As the speech continues, Roosevelt claims that the strenuous life can benefit not just the individual, but also the entire country. He advocates imperialism as an extension of the strenuous life. America must become involved in global affairs, or else it will suffer as a nation.

In particular, Roosevelt explicitly defended the ongoing U.S. colonization of the Philippines, asserting that Filipinos were "utterly unfit for self-government" and that without American rule the islands would descend into "savage anarchy." He warned that if the United States failed to govern the Philippines, "some stronger and more manful race" would have to do so. He also condemned anti‑imperialists who appealed to "liberty" and the "consent of the governed," calling them "timid" men who refused to "play the part of men." For Roosevelt, embracing these imperialist duties was essential to both individual success and national greatness.

America must be a powerful country, and it must exert this power if it sees fit. Such strength necessarily requires a strong military, and a strong military presence. Roosevelt's concluding words tie together the importance of the strenuous life in the individual and the nation:

Above all, let us shrink from no strife, moral or physical, within or without the nation, provided we are certain that the strife is justified, for it is only through strife, through hard and dangerous endeavor, that we shall ultimately win the goal of true national greatness.

The speech was published in 1900 as part of a collection of other Roosevelt writings and addresses also entitled The Strenuous Life.

== Importance ==
The speech reflected his own personality and experience. Roosevelt was sickly and asthmatic as a child. He had to sleep propped up in bed or slouching in a chair. He was in poor physical condition as a result. Roosevelt's father compelled the young Roosevelt to take up exercise, including boxing lessons in order to ward off bullies.

The influence stuck. Upon graduating from Harvard University, Roosevelt underwent a physical examination. His doctor advised him that due to serious heart problems, he should find a desk job and avoid strenuous activity. Roosevelt disregarded the advice. As an adult, he exercised regularly. He took up boxing, tennis, hiking, rowing, polo, and horseback riding. While Governor of New York, he boxed with sparring partners several times a week, a practice he continued as President until one blow detached his left retina, leaving him blind in that eye (a fact not made public until many years later). Thereafter, he practiced jujutsu and continued his habit of skinny-dipping in the Potomac River during winter.

As a result, the phrase "the strenuous life" has become highly connected to Roosevelt's life. Nathan Miller's biography of Roosevelt, Theodore Roosevelt: A Life, begins by saying that "the strenuous life" is one of "the things that immediately come to mind when Theodore Roosevelt's name is mentioned."

The speech also reflected the American spirit at the turn of the 20th century. The increasing industrialization and urbanization of America led many to become fearful of growing weak. College sports were on the rise, as were recreational athletics such as bicycling. American culture embraced masculinity, patriotism, and nationalism. Issues of masculinity were especially predominant during this time, given the various women's movements of the age. Critics and scholars, including author Henry James, worried about a femininization of America. The time was ripe for Roosevelt to extol the masculine virtues of the strenuous life. Roosevelt used the speech to justify American imperialism as well.

== In popular culture ==
- In 1902, Scott Joplin wrote a rag called "The Strenuous Life" as a tribute to the speech and its cultural impact.
- Sarah Vowell's collection of essays entitled The Partly Cloudy Patriot includes one entitled "The Strenuous Life." Vowell compares her life to Roosevelt's, especially her lack of strenuousness, and refers to the speech directly.
- Kathleen Dalton's biography of Roosevelt is entitled Theodore Roosevelt: A Strenuous Life.
- A character in Lyonel Feininger's 1906 comic page for the Chicago Tribune, The Kin-der-Kids was named "Strenuous Teddy."
- Ryan Swanson chronicles Roosevelt's relationship with sports in The Strenuous Life: Theodore Roosevelt and the Making of the American Athlete.
- In Don Rosa's comic "The Sharpie of the Culebra Cut", Scrooge McDuck is reunited with Roosevelt during the digging of the Panama Canal in 1906, and repeats Roosevelt's own words as explanation for why he has continued to travel the world and seek more opportunities to make money, in spite of having already become a billionaire.
- In 2017, Art of Manliness editor Brett McKay launched The Strenuous Life program inspired by Roosevelt's philosophy. Members of the program commit to living strenuously through physical fitness, a daily good deed, a series of weekly challenges called agons, and a merit badge system covering a wide range of skills and interests in a man's life.

== See also ==
- No pain, no gain
- Simple living
