= List of history podcasts =

The following is a list of history podcasts.

== List ==
Podcast	Year	Starring, Narrator(s), or Host(s)	Produced by	Ref
15 Minute History	2019–present		Independent	
1619	2019	Nikole Hannah-Jones	The New York Times	
1865	2019–2021		Airship and Wondery	
30 for 30	2017–present		ESPN	
The Age Of Napoleon	2017–present	E.M. Rummage		
American History Tellers	2018–present	Lindsay Graham	Wondery	
Ancient History Fangirl				
ArtCurious				
Atlanta Monster				
Backstory	2015–present	Ed Ayers, Brian Balogh, Nathan Connolly and Joanne Freeman	Independent	
Behind The Bastards	2018–present	Robert Evans (journalist)	Cool Zone Media	
Biography				
Bizarre States				
Black History Year				
Bowery Boys	2008–present	Greg and Tom	Bowery Boys Media	
The British History Podcast	2011–present	Jamie Jeffers		
Burnt Toast				
The Cine-Files				
Cocaine and Rhinestones	2017–present	Tyler Mahan Coe	Coe Operation	
Crossfire				
The Dollop	2014– present	Dave Anthony, Gareth Reynolds	All Things Comedy Network	
Fall of Civilizations	2019– present	Paul Cooper	Independent	
Fin vs History	2025-Present	Fin Taylor, Horatio Gould	Fumblerooski Productions	
Flashback: History's Unintended Consequences				
Gastropod				
Ghost Town	2018–present	Jason Horton, Rebecca Leib		
Hardcore History	2006–present	Dan Carlin		
Historical Figures				
History Becomes Her	2020		Mashable	
The History Chicks	2011–present	Susan Vollenweider and Beckett Graham	Wondery	
History Extra	2007–present		Immediate Media Company	
The History of American Slavery				
The History of England	2010–present	David Crowther		
The History of Rome	2007–2012	Mike Duncan		
The History of Byzantium	2012-2026	Robin Pierson		
A History of the World in 100 Objects				
History on Fire		Daniele Bolelli		
Lore				
The Memory Palace	2008–present	Nate DiMeo		
More Perfect	2016–present	Kai Wright	WNYC Studios	
Music History Project	2017-present	Dan Del Fiorentino	NAMM	
The New York Public Library Podcast				
Nice Try!				
Preservation Oaks	2021-Present	Sean Thomas Radcliff		
Presidential				
The Rest is History	2020-present	Tom Holland, Dominic Sandbrook	Goalhanger Podcasts	
Reverberate				
Revisionist History	2016–present	Malcolm Gladwell	Pushkin Industries	
Revolutions	2013–Present	Mike Duncan		
Ridiculous History				
Sawbones: A Martial Tour of Misguided Medicine				
Seemingly Unrelated	2024-Present	Dr. Andrew Johnstone	Life's Little Murder Boards	
Sidedoor				
Slow Burn	2017–present		Slate	
The Sneak	2019–present	Nate Scott	USA Today and Wondery	
Something True				
SpyCast	2006–present	Dr. Andrew Hammond	International Spy Museum	
Stuff You Missed in History Class				
This Podcast Will Kill You				
Throughline	2019–present	Ramtin Arablouei and Rund Abdelfatah	NPR	
Tides of History		Patrick Wyman		
To the Best of Our Knowledge				
Travels Through Time				
Uncivil				
You Must Remember This				
You’re Dead to Me				
You're Wrong About				
The Nightingale of Iran				

== See also ==
- Popular history
