= List of The Daily Show episodes (2009) =

- No. of episodes: 161

Release
- Original network: Comedy Central

Season chronology
- ← Previous; 2008 episodes Next → 2010 episodes

This is a list of episodes for The Daily Show with Jon Stewart in 2009.

== 2009 ==
=== January ===
Date	Guest	Promotion
January 5	David Gregory	TV show Meet the Press
January 6	Michael Wolff	Book The Man Who Owns the News: Inside the Secret World of Rupert Murdoch
January 7	Rachel Maddow	TV show The Rachel Maddow Show
January 8	Dana Perino	White House Press Secretary
January 12	Maxwell Kennedy	Book Danger's Hour: The Story of the USS Bunker Hill and the Kamikaze Pilot Who Crippled Her
January 13	Daniel Craig	Film Defiance
January 14	Fareed Zakaria	TV show Fareed Zakaria GPS
January 15	Bethany McLean	Discussion on corporate corruption
January 19	Abderrahim Foukara	Washington Bureau Chief, Al Jazeera International
January 20	Rt. Rev. V. Gene Robinson	Bishop of New Hampshire
January 21	David Sanger	The New York Times White House Correspondent
January 22	Liam Neeson	Film Taken
January 26	President Jimmy Carter	Book We Can Have Peace in the Holy Land
January 27	Gwen Ifill	Book The Breakthrough: Politics and Race in the Age of Obama
January 28	Neil DeGrasse Tyson	Book The Pluto Files and asteroid 99942 Apophis
January 29	P. W. Singer	Book Wired for War

=== February ===
Date	Guest	Promotion
February 2	Lawrence Lindsey	Book What A President Should Know: An Insider's View on How to Succeed in the Oval Office
February 3	Dev Patel	Film Slumdog Millionaire
February 4	Karen Greenberg	Book The Least Worst Place: Guantanamo's First 100 Days
February 5	Randall Balmer	Book God in the White House: A History
February 9	Walter Isaacson	Article "How to Save Your Newspaper" in Time Magazine
February 10	Thomas Ricks	Book The Gamble
February 11	Daniel Sperling	Book Two Billion Cars: Driving Toward Sustainability
February 12	John Sununu	Solutions for the economic crisis
February 23	Jeff Bezos	Amazon Kindle 2
February 24	Ricky Gervais	Podcast The Ricky Gervais Guide to...
February 25	Tom Selleck	TV film Jesse Stone: Thin Ice
February 26	Brian Williams	TV show NBC Nightly News

=== March ===
Date	Guest	Promotion
March 2	Harold Varmus	Book The Art and Politics of Science
March 3	Sandra Day O'Connor	OurCourts.org
March 4	Joe Nocera	Nocera's New York Times column
March 5	Billy Crudup	Film Watchmen
March 9	Nathaniel Frank	Book Unfriendly Fire: How the Gay Ban Undermines the Military and Weakens America
March 10	Craig Mullaney	Book The Unforgiving Minute: A Soldier's Education
March 11	Paul Rudd	Film I Love You, Man
March 12	Jim Cramer	TV show Mad Money and Jon Stewart's recent criticisms of CNBC.
March 16	Gen. Richard B. Myers	Book Eyes on the Horizon: Serving on the Front Lines of National Security
March 17	Ian McShane	TV show Kings
March 18	Nandan Nilekani	Book Imagining India
March 19	Bruce Springsteen	Album Working on a Dream
March 30	Jack Cafferty	Book Now or Never: Getting Down to the Business of Saving Our American Dream
March 31	Seth Rogen	Film Observe and Report

=== April ===
Date	Guest	Promotion
April 1	Peter R. Orszag	Director of the Office of Management and Budget
April 2	Tom Zoellner	Book Uranium
April 6	Michael J. Fox	Book Always Looking Up
April 7	Jehan Al Sadat	Book My Hope for Peace
April 8	Nancy Pelosi	Book Know Your Power and recent legislation during the Obama administration
April 9	William D. Cohan	Book House of Cards
April 14	Ron Darling	Book The Complete Game
April 15	Elizabeth Warren	Chair of the Congressional Oversight Panel over the Troubled Asset Relief Program
April 16	Ben Affleck	Film State of Play
April 20	Reza Aslan	Book How to Win a Cosmic War
April 21	Ellen Johnson Sirleaf	Book This Child Will Be Great
April 22	Philip Alcabes	Book Dread
April 23	Richard Beeman	Book Plain Honest Men
April 27	Christine Lagarde	French Minister of the Economy, Industry and Employment
April 28	Clifford May	Foundation for Defense of Democracies
April 29	Doris Kearns Goodwin	Book Team of Rivals: The Political Genius of Abraham Lincoln
April 30	Hugh Jackman	Film X-Men Origins: Wolverine

=== May ===
Date	Guest	Promotion
May 4	Denis Leary	TV show Rescue Me
May 5	Fareed Zakaria	Book The Post-American World
May 6	George Stephanopoulos	TV show This Week with George Stephanopoulos
May 7	Ken Salazar	United States Secretary of the Interior
May 11	Frank Partnoy	Book The Match King
May 12	Tom Hanks	Film Angels & Demons
May 13	Husain Haqqani	Pakistan Ambassador to the United States
May 14	Lisa P. Jackson	Administrator of the Environmental Protection Agency
May 18	Sarah Fisher	2009 Indianapolis 500
May 19	Newt Gingrich	Book 5 Principles for a Successful Life
May 20	Elizabeth Edwards	Book Resilience
May 21	Larry King	Book My Remarkable Journey

=== June ===
Date	Guest	Promotion
June 1	Bob Woodruff	TV documentary Earth 2100
June 2	P.J. O'Rourke	Book Driving Like Crazy
June 3	Michael Lewis	Book Home Game: An Accidental Guide to Fatherhood
June 4	Will Ferrell	Film Land of the Lost
June 8	Gretchen Peters	Book Seeds of Terror
June 9	Peter Schiff	Book The Little Book of Bull Moves in Bear Markets
June 10	Saad Mohseni	Documentary Afghan Star
June 11	Katie Couric	TV show CBS Evening News
June 15	Ed Helms	Film The Hangover
June 16	Tom Folsom	Book The Mad Ones
June 17	Peter Laufer	Book The Dangerous World of Butterflies
June 18	Mike Huckabee	Former Governor of Arkansas, talking on abortion in the United States
June 22	Bill Russell	Book Red and Me
June 23	Larry David	Film Whatever Works
June 24	Reza Aslan	Book How to Win a Cosmic War
June 25	Cameron Diaz	Film My Sister's Keeper
June 29	Oliver Sacks	Book Musicophilia
June 30	Mike Kim	Book Escaping North Korea: Defiance and Hope in the World’s Most Repressive Country

=== July ===
Date	Guest	Promotion
July 1	Justin Fox	Book The Myth of the Rational Market: A History of Risk, Reward, and Delusion on Wall Street
July 2	Robert Kenner	Film Food, Inc.
July 13	Barney Frank	Chairman of the United States House Committee on Financial Services
July 14	Peter Mancall	Book Fatal Journey
July 15	Kathleen Sebelius	United States Secretary of Health and Human Services, talking on the stimulus bill
July 16	Robert Glennon	Book Unquenchable
July 20	Brian Williams	
July 21	Steven Chu	United States Secretary of Energy
July 22	Kevin Nealon	TV show Weeds
July 23	Sally Jenkins	Book The State of Jones
July 27	Bill Kristol	Criticism of the Obama administration and United States health care reform
July 28	Spinal Tap	Album Back from the Dead
July 29	John R. Bolton	Support for military action against Iran
July 30	Judd Apatow	Film Funny People

=== August ===
Date	Guest	Promotion
August 3	Ronald Kessler	Book In the President's Secret Service
August 4	Henry Waxman (D-CA)	Chairman of the United States House Committee on Energy and Commerce
August 5	Paul Giamatti	Film Cold Souls
August 6	Dara Torres	Book Age is Just a Number
August 10	Douglas Brinkley	Book The Wilderness Warrior: Theodore Roosevelt and the Crusade for America
August 11	Austan Goolsbee	Economic Adviser to President Barack Obama
August 12	Larry Lawton (skit) and Jeff Sharlet (interview)	Book The Family: Secret Fundamentalism at the Heart of American Power
August 13	Rachel McAdams	Movie The Time Traveler's Wife
August 17	David Cross	Book I Drink For A Reason
August 18	Christopher McDougall	Book Born To Run (see Tarahumara and Copper Canyon)
August 19	Tim Gunn	TV show Project Runway
August 20	Betsy McCaughey	Former Lieutenant Governor of New York, critical of the 2009 health care reform proposals

=== September ===
Date	Guest	Promotion
September 14	LeBron James	Book Shooting Stars
September 15	Matt Damon	Film The Informant!
September 16	Ricky Gervais	Film The Invention of Lying
September 17	President Bill Clinton	Mission to North Korea and health care reform
September 22	Vali Nasr	Book Forces of Fortune: The Rise of a New Muslim Middle Class and What It Means for Our World
September 23	Tom Ridge	Former United States Secretary of Homeland Security
September 24	Rod Blagojevich	Defense against 2008 corruption charges. Interview announced on August 13 after a segment about Blagojevich.
September 28	Bruce Bueno de Mesquita	Book The Predictioneer's Game
September 29	Ron Paul	Book End The Fed
September 30	Jon Krakauer	Book Where Men Win Glory: The Odyssey of Pat Tillman

=== October ===
Date	Guest	Promotion
October 1	Joy Behar	TV show The Joy Behar Show
October 5	Sarah Vowell	Book The Wordy Shipmates
October 6	Ray Mabus	United States Secretary of the Navy
October 7	William Kamkwamba	Book The Boy Who Harnessed the Wind
October 8	David Gregory	TV show Meet the Press
October 12	Janet Napolitano	United States Secretary of Homeland Security
October 13	Chesley Sullenberger	Book Highest Duty
October 14	Barbara Ehrenreich	Book Bright-Sided
October 15	Jennifer Burns	Book Goddess of the Market
October 26	Susie Essman	Book What Would Susie Say
October 27	Steven Levitt	Book SuperFreakonomics
October 28	Dr. Mustafa Barghouti and Anna Baltzer	Peace in the Israeli–Palestinian conflict
October 29	Wanda Sykes	TV show The Wanda Sykes Show

=== November ===
Date	Guest	Promotion
November 2	Bob Menendez	Book Growing American Roots: Why Our Nation Will Thrive as Our Largest Minority Flourishes
November 3	David Plouffe	Book The Audacity to Win: The Inside Story and Lessons of Barack Obama's Historic Victory
November 4	Al Gore	Book Our Choice
November 5	Susan Rice	United States Ambassador to the United Nations
November 9	Kit Bond	Book The Next Front: Southeast Asia and the Road to Global Peace with Islam
November 10	Serena Williams	Book On the Line
November 11	Clarence Clemons	Book Big Man: Real Life & Tall Tales
November 12	Jane Goodall	The Jane Goodall Institute
November 16	Jake Adelstein	Book Tokyo Vice
November 17	Joe Biden	Vice President of the United States
November 18	Lou Dobbs	Radio show The Lou Dobbs Show
November 19	Jack's Mannequin	Album The Glass Passenger
November 30	Maziar Bahari	Discusses his four-month-long imprisonment in Iran, due to an interview on a previous Daily Show episode.

=== December ===
Date	Guest	Promotion
December 1	Thomas Friedman	Paperback book Hot, Flat, and Crowded: Why We Need a Green Revolution--And How It Can Renew America
December 2	Lance Armstrong	Book Comeback 2.0: Up Close and Personal
December 3	Michael Specter	Book Denialism: How Irrational Thinking Hinders Scientific Progress, Harms the Planet, and Threatens Our Lives
December 7	Dan Rather	Former Anchor CBS Evening News
December 8	Mike Huckabee	Former Governor of Arkansas
December 9	Andrew Ross Sorkin	Book Too Big to Fail: The Inside Story of how Wall Street and Washington Fought to Save the Financial System—and Themselves
December 10	Gwen Ifill	Book The Breakthrough: Politics and Race in the Age of Obama
December 14	Sigourney Weaver	Film Avatar
December 15	Ray LaHood	United States Secretary of Transportation
December 16	Hugh Grant	Film Did You Hear About the Morgans?
