= Radio On (disambiguation) =

Radio On may refer to:

- Radio On, a 1979 British film
- Radio On: A Listener's Diary, a 1997 book by Sarah Vowell
- "Radio On" (song), a song by Kylie Minogue
- "Radio On" (Runaways), an episode of Runaways
