= Hero of Two Worlds =

The Hero of Two Worlds is a name used to refer to several historic figures, known for their accomplishments in both the Old and New Worlds. Prominent figures called this include:

== People ==
- Marquis de Lafayette (1757–1834), for his accomplishments in the service of both France and the United States
- Giuseppe Garibaldi (1807–1882), for his military enterprises in South America and Europe
- Tadeusz Kościuszko (1746–1817), a national hero in Poland, Lithuania, Belarus, and the United States
- Casimir Pulaski (1745–1779), a Polish nobleman who fought for independence and freedom in both Poland and the United States
- Peter I of Brazil and IV of Portugal (1798–1834), a Portuguese dynast who declared the Brazilian independence and became the first Emperor of the new country, before returning to Portugal to restore the constitutional monarchy in a civil war against his brother

== Other uses ==
- Hero of Two Worlds: The Marquis de Lafayette in the Age of Revolution, a 2021 biography by Mike Duncan about the Marquis de Lafayette
