= The History of Rome =

The History of Rome can refer to:

- History of Rome (Livy) (Ab urbe condita, "From the Founding of the City"), a 1st century BCE work by Livy
- The History of Rome (Mommsen) (Römische Geschichte), an 1854–1856 multi-volume work by historian Theodor Mommsen
- The History of Rome (podcast), a 2007–2012 podcast created by Mike Duncan

== See also ==
- History of Rome
