= Lafayette in the Somewhat United States =

2015 book by Sarah Vowell

- First edition
- Author: Sarah Vowell
- Language: English
- Published: 2015
- Publisher: Riverhead Books
- Publication place: United States
- Pages: 274

Lafayette in the Somewhat United States is a 2015 non-fiction book written by Sarah Vowell about the travels of the American and French revolutionary Marquis de Lafayette in early America.

== See also ==
- 1824–1825 Grand Tour of the United States
- 1824 New York City parade
- 1824 Philadelphia parade
- Hero of Two Worlds: The Marquis de Lafayette in the Age of Revolution (2021) by Mike Duncan
