= The History of Rome (podcast) =

History podcast by Mike Duncan

The History of Rome (THoR)
- Genre: History
- Language: English

Cast and voices
- Hosted by: Mike Duncan

Production
- Length: Usually 15–30 minutes (range 11:23–43:36); Total Runtime: 73 hours

Technical specifications
- Audio format: MP3

Publication
- No. of episodes: 179
- Original release: July 27, 2007 – May 6, 2012

The History of Rome, often abbreviated THoR, was a podcast created by Mike Duncan which aired between 2007 and 2012. In the 2010 podcast awards, THoR won best educational podcast. THoR covers the time period from the origin of the Roman Kingdom to the Fall of the Western Roman Empire, focusing on the most accepted chain of events according to historical consensus.

== Origins ==
Duncan came up with the idea of THoR during a plane flight and subsequent vacation. He was impressed by 12 Byzantine Rulers, a podcast by Lars Brownworth, however, he struggled to find anything similar on the history of Rome. Duncan had a longstanding interest in Roman history and was reading The War With Hannibal by Livy at the time. He enjoyed many of the historical episodes he encountered in the book, but realized that much of the public knew little about Rome outside of Caesar and Augustus' time. One of Duncan's motivators for creating the podcast was to make the whole of Roman history attractive to the public through the form of a podcast.

== Making of the podcast ==
Duncan used primary sources such as Livy and Tacitus as much as possible, while using secondary or modern sources to help judge the veracity and objectivity of each source. In making the podcast, Duncan read almost exclusively about Roman history. Each show required Duncan 10 to 12 hours prep time, in addition to countless hours reading source material throughout the week. Duncan would aim to keep his episodes at around 4000 words. When recording, he would run two parallel tracks in GarageBand to preempt any errors, and would do a preparatory reading beforehand. He finished each podcast with a celebratory beer.

Duncan has mentioned that in making the podcast, he learned "human nature has changed very little," and that people generally respond to the same situations in the same sorts of ways. "I don't think we're so completely different than any Roman was."

The soundtrack which begins and ends each podcast comes from the GarageBand snippet Acoustic Picking 18.

By 2017, episodes of The History of Rome had over fifty-six million downloads.

== Tours ==
As an extension to the podcast, Duncan has led recurring guided tours around Rome, also visiting Ostia, Pompeii, Capri, and the field of Cannae; the tours walk through many sites mentioned in The History of Rome.

== Books ==
On June 4, 2016, Duncan's book, The History of Rome: The Republic (Volume 1) was published. The book is a collection of edited transcripts from the first 46 episodes of the podcast, covering the time period from the founding of the Roman Kingdom through the breakdown of the Republic.

In October 2017, Duncan's book The Storm Before the Storm: The Beginning of the End of the Roman Republic, was published by PublicAffairs, an imprint of Hachette Book Group. It focused on the period between the rise of the Gracchi Brothers through Sulla's Civil War, which is covered in Episodes 29 through 34 of the THoR podcast. The book debuted as number eight on The New York Times list of best-selling nonfiction.

== Legacy and influence ==
The History of Byzantium podcast by Robin Pierson is explicitly modelled after THoR in style, length and quality; Pierson said in an interview on Podcast Squared that he intended the podcast as a sequel to The History of Rome in order to complete the story. David Crowther of The History of England podcast has mentioned Duncan as an influence, as has Peter Adamson of the podcast: The History of Philosophy without any Gaps. Isaac Meyer of the History of Japan podcast has mentioned in a few episodes that The History of Rome podcast inspired the "A day in the life of..." episodes.

Duncan has mentioned in turn being greatly inspired by the prior work of Lars Brownworth. Duncan has said he hopes that other history podcasters will follow his mantra and stick to "just the content" without a lot of "extraneous babbling", in order to give their podcasts as professional a feel as possible – thus making the podcast an educational experience geared to learning the subject of the podcast. Duncan mentioned on Podcast Squared consistency as critical to building an audience and being respectful to their time and advises every podcaster to set a deadline and stick with it. "If you can get (people) on a routine and looking forward to (the podcast), they'll stick around".

The series proved popular enough that six years after the podcast ended, Duncan released two sets of appendix THoR episodes that covered topics he had not been able to properly address in the main series, and which he had learned a lot about through the research for The Storm Before the Storm. The first set of episodes covered the lives of the ancient writers whose sources he used for The Storm Before the Storm, including Cato the Elder, Polybius, Sallust, and Pliny the Elder. The second set covered the Iberian Wars of the 2nd Century BC, a series of bloody conflicts largely unmentioned in the main series. Both sets of appendix episodes are currently locked behind a paywall on his Revolutions Podcast Fundraiser site.

== See also ==
- List of history podcasts
