= Unfamiliar Fishes =

2011 book by Sarah Vowell

- Author: Sarah Vowell
- Language: English
- Subject: History of Hawaii
- Genre: Popular history
- Publisher: Riverhead Books
- Publication date: 22 March 2011
- Publication place: United States
- Media type: Print (hardcover and paperback); Audiobook
- Pages: 238
- ISBN: 978-1594487873
- LC Class: DU625 .V89 2011

Unfamiliar Fishes is a nonfiction book by American writer Sarah Vowell, published in 2011 by Riverhead Books.

== Synopsis ==
The book takes a humorous tone and examines the fulfillment of American imperialist manifest destiny at the end of the 19th century as America annexed Hawaii, Puerto Rico, and Guam, and invaded Cuba, and the Philippines in 1898, in an attempt to become a global power. Vowell then tells the story of the culture clash that ensued following Christian missionaries who then moved in swiftly to try to convert the laid back native Hawaiians to the American way. The title comes from a reference of David Malo.

== Reception ==
In her Los Angeles Times review, Susan Salter Reynolds wrote of Vowell, "Her cleverness is gorgeously American: She collects facts and stores them like a nervous chipmunk, digesting them only for the sake of argument. Her curiosity is fueled by indignation. She insists, like a good empiricist, on seeing the people and places she writes about. She is the queen of that great American institution: the road trip."

By contrast, Michiko Kakutani in The New York Times criticized Vowell's casual, conversational style: "Certainly at a time when ignorance and historical illiteracy are rampant, there is a place for books that make the past relevant and easy to digest for the casual reader. But Ms. Vowell's determination to render history user-friendly often feels reductive and condescending, and her contemporary analogies can be strained."

However, in The New York Times Book Review, Hawaii resident Kaui Hart Hemmings praised the author thus: "Vowell deftly summarizes complex events and significant upheavals, reducing them to their essence... While Vowell's take on Hawaii's Americanization is abbreviated, it's never bereft of substance—her repartee manages to be filling, her insights astute and comprehensive. It's not surprising to learn that she spent significant time interacting with islanders and combing through journals and archives. A variety of voices are heard, and all sides are implicated in the old Hawaii's demise."

Writing for National Public Radio, Dan Kois said that although Vowell was "good at connecting the dots in ways that make history vivid for her readers," he found the book "glib" and the subject "so complicated that her anecdotal structure isn't quite up to the task." He also cited "the limitations of Vowell's arch style."

== Audiobook ==
An unabridged audiobook was released by Simon & Schuster on March 22, 2011. It contained a large cast of readers, and music was performed by Michael Giacchino and Grant-Lee Phillips. The cast was:

- Fred Armisen as David Kalākaua, Henry Obookiah, and George Vancouver
- Bill Hader as Rufus Anderson, Captain James Cook, Robert Dampier, Sanford Dole, and Walter Murray Gibson
- John Hodgman as Amos Cooke and Teddy Roosevelt
- Catherine Keener as Lucy Goodale Thurston
- Edward Norton as Hiram Bingham and Grover Cleveland
- Keanu Reeves as David Malo
- Paul Rudd as Lorrin Thurston
- Maya Rudolph as Sybil Bingham and Queen Liluokalani
- John Slattery as Levi Chamberlain, Henry Cabot Lodge, and Ernest Hemingway
