= Take the Cannoli =

2000 book of essays by Sarah Vowell

- Author: Sarah Vowell
- Language: English
- Genre: Essay collection
- Publisher: Simon & Schuster
- Publication date: April 2000
- Publication place: United States
- Media type: Print (hardcover, paperback)
- Pages: 219
- ISBN: 978-0684867977

Take the Cannoli: Stories From the New World is a collection of personal essays by Sarah Vowell, published by Simon & Schuster in 2000. Her essays cover a wide range of topics, including political arguments with her father, her school years in marching band, her driving phobia, her obsession in college with The Godfather film (the collection's title comes from a line in the film spoken by caporegime Peter Clemenza), the historic intersection of Michigan Avenue and Wacker Drive in Chicago, and a road trip with her twin sister to retrace their Cherokee ancestors' journey on the Trail of Tears.

Take the Cannoli was Vowell's second published book and cemented her reputation as an insightful, humorous American author with a writing voice that alternates between "sweet and sour, naïve and cynical".

== Background ==
Most of the essays began as commentaries by Vowell on the Public Radio International program This American Life. In 1996 she joined the program as a contributing editor, and remained in that role for over a decade.

== Synopsis ==
Her opening essay, "Shooting Dad", recounts the long-running political feud between herself, a liberal Democrat, and her father, a conservative Republican, who likes to telephone her each Election Day and "cheerfully inform me that he has once again canceled out my vote." She characterizes him as a proud gun shop owner, gun enthusiast, and gunsmith in Bozeman, Montana. When she hears he has built "his most elaborate tool of death yet", a small homemade cannon, she travels back to Bozeman to accompany him on a weekend expedition to the Bridger Mountains to test out the cannon.

In the title essay, Vowell reveals her secret addiction in college to watching The Godfather repeatedly on videotape: "I would sit on my couch with the blinds drawn, stare at the TV screen, and imagine myself inside it. I wanted to cower in the dark brown rooms of Don Corleone, kiss his hand on his daughter's wedding day, explain what my troubles were, and let him tell me he'll make everything all right." She came to realize that what she most appreciated was the film's depiction of a world with clear moral guidelines. It was a time in her life when she had lost faith in religion and was feeling adrift. In her favorite scene, after the Don's henchman Clemenza arranges a grisly "hit" in an automobile, he remembers his obligation to his family, and that he promised his wife he would bring dessert home: "His instruction to his partner in crime is an entire moral manifesto in six little words: 'Leave the gun. Take the cannoli.'" She says she loved the many rules for living articulated in The Godfather, such as "a man who doesn't spend time with his family can never be a real man", and the maxim:

"Never tell anybody outside the family what you're thinking again." That last one was a rule I myself could follow. Not only did I not tell anyone outside my family what I was thinking, I was pretty tight-lipped with family too.

Her other essays lead the reader on a tour of Americana and pop culture, including Frank Sinatra's birthplace in Hoboken, the Michigan Avenue Bridge in Chicago, mix tapes, Goth subculture, and the Chelsea Hotel in Manhattan. Regarding the hotel's legendary grunge and "bohemian grit", she writes: "I'm no neat freak. It's just that, like a lot of people from working-class backgrounds, I don't particularly romanticize squalor. Just because I have dirty little books by Jean Genet on my shelves at home, doesn't mean there aren't cleaning products labeled 'antibacterial' under the sink."

Her visit to Florida's Disney World and its Hall of Presidents attraction introduces a recurring theme: her animosity for U.S. President Andrew Jackson, "architect of the Indian removal policy". Vowell's early childhood was spent in the town of Braggs in Muskogee County, Oklahoma (before the family moved to Bozeman) where she learned that her maternal grandfather had been "a Cherokee wart doctor". As a young adult she became curious about the Trail of Tears that brought some of her ancestors to eastern Oklahoma.

The longest essay, "What I See When I Look at the Face on the $20 Bill", describes how she and her twin sister Amy embark on a road trip to follow the Trail of Tears path walked by Native Americans. Along the way, the Vowell sisters stop at Andrew Jackson's Tennessee plantation. They visit landmarks such as the Tsa-La-Gi village, as well as tacky souvenir shops. They discover a small Trail of Tears marker in Fayetteville, Arkansas next to a high school parking lot, prompting Sarah to write: "Anyone who's ever been to high school would recognize it instantly as the place students go to sneak cigarettes or get stoned. And once again it's striking how the two American tendencies exist side by side—to remember our past, and to completely ignore it and have fun. Don't we mourn the dead on Memorial Day with volleyball and sunscreen?"

"Dark Circles" is an essay about the insomnia that has plagued Vowell throughout her life. She lists the techniques and advice (all of which were ineffectual) she received over the years to bring her relief. In the end she wonders if there ever were a medical cure, would she use it?

We are flawed creatures, all of us. Some of us think that means we should fix our flaws. But get rid of my flaws and there would be no one left. If I looked in the mirror someday and saw no dark circles under my eyes, I would probably look better. I just wouldn't look like me.

== Reception ==
In a Los Angeles Times review of Take the Cannoli, Susan Salter Reynolds asked, "Why is it that kitsch is even funnier in print than in person? Perhaps it's the solemnity of the black and white pages, the elegance of print underscoring the brassy, colorful absurdity of kitsch. Sarah Vowell is a madonna of Americana, applying the same ironic evil eye to Disney World as, say, Joan Didion applied to El Salvador or Miami."

In The New York Times, Rick Marin wrote that Vowell's essays, with their origins on This American Life, "contain everything I find irritating and boring about PRI and National Public Radio. Self-indulgent monologues. Received wisdom passing for irreverence. Cozy smugness." Damon Smith made a similar comment in The Boston Globe that for those "unaccustomed to the tone commonly adopted by on-air NPR personalities ... be forewarned. Despite the flashes of genius illuminating this spunky, humorous collection, one must learn to breathe in the dense cloud of narcissism hovering over it all."

In her review for Knight Ridder Newspapers, Crystal Dempsey praised Vowell's style as "casual and conversational, critical and confessional. She's a sassy storyteller who can warm your heart and teach you a lesson." The A.V. Club called Take the Cannoli a "surprisingly successful assessment of American life free from the trappings of grandiosity."
