= Karina Longworth =

American film crtic and journalist

- Longworth at the 2026 Montclair Film Festival
- Education: San Francisco Art Institute, New York University (BFA, MA)
- Occupations: Film critic; author; journalist
- Spouse: Rian Johnson (m. 2018)
- Relatives: Nathan Johnson (cousin-in-law)

Karina Longworth is an American film critic, author, and journalist based in Los Angeles. Longworth writes, hosts and produces the podcast You Must Remember This, about the "secret and/or forgotten histories of Hollywood's first century".

== Early life and education ==
Longworth was born to a British father and an American mother. She received a BFA in Film from the San Francisco Art Institute and a Master of Arts in Cinema Studies from New York University.

== Writing ==
She is one of the founders of the film culture blog Cinematical and formerly edited both Cinematical and the film blog SpoutBlog and, while living in New York, was heard regularly on the Public Radio International show The Takeaway. From 2010 to 2012, she was the Film Editor and lead critic at LA Weekly.

Longworth has contributed to numerous magazines, including New York Magazine, Filmmaker, Time Out New York, Cineaste, and Las Vegas Weekly, as well as the online publications Slate, IndieWire, The Daily Beast, HuffPost, The Village Voice, and Vanity Fair's Little Gold Men blog.

== Internet film criticism vs. print film criticism ==
When she was still a web critic for SpoutBlog, Longworth appeared in the documentary For the Love of Movies: The Story of American Film Criticism, explaining the virtues of blogging – for creating a back-and-forth dialogue with readers. About blogging she went on to say, "I have a Master's Degree in Film Studies, but I’m no more qualified to blog than a high school student in Vermont." The New York Times has called Longworth "freakishly smart", and Variety said, "... it's the ever-proliferating bloggers – Spout, Cinematical, Movie City News and Hollywood Elsewhere – that have become the instant barometers for how a film plays."

In 2007, Variety said, "As the pool of well-paid print critics shrinks in size, the next generation of film fans may come to trust critic/bloggers like … Spout's Karina Longworth, who helped to create the major film blog Cinematical". The New York Times has commented, "Are print critics really so all-important and sacrosanct with the Web full of debates about all manner of film in places like indiewire.com, cinematical.com and blog.spout.com?"

== You Must Remember This podcast ==
In April 2014, Longworth launched You Must Remember This, a podcast that covers lesser-known Hollywood stories from the twentieth century. Distributed by the Panoply network in association with Slate Magazine, there have been over 200 episodes as of 2025, all written and narrated by Longworth. It has become one of the top film podcasts; the Washington Post called it "knowledgeable and laceratingly funny". Podcast Magazine gave the show five out of five mics. The show won the 2016 award for "TV & Film" at the Academy of Podcasters Awards and was a finalist in the 2017. The podcast's most talked-about series to date was adapted from the unfinished memoir of Academy Award nominated production designer and film producer Polly Platt.

== Personal life ==
Longworth married director Rian Johnson in 2018.

== Works ==
- The Portable SpoutBlog: Rants, reviews and reports from the film blog edited by Karina Longworth (2009), ISBN 1448695716
- Masters of Cinema: George Lucas (2012), ISBN 2866429044
- Al Pacino: Anatomy of an Actor (2013), ISBN 0714866644
- Meryl Streep: Anatomy of an Actor (2014), ISBN 0714866695
- Hollywood Frame By Frame: The Unseen Silver Screen in Contact Sheets, 1951-1977 (2014), ISBN 1616892595
- Seduction: Sex, Lies, and Stardom in Howard Hughes's Hollywood (2018), ISBN 0062440519

== See also ==
- List of history podcasts
