= Waiting for Impact =

Limited series podcast about the band Sudden Impact

- Language: English

Creative team
- Created by: Dave Holmes

Cast and voices
- Hosted by: Dave Holmes

Publication
- No. of episodes: 10
- Original release: October 12, 2021
- Provider: Exactly Right Podcast Network

Waiting for Impact is a 10-episode limited series podcast hosted by Dave Holmes. It premiered on the Exactly Right Podcast network on October 12, 2021. It tells the story of a 1990s band Sudden Impact who disappeared after making an appearance in a Boyz II Men video.

In addition to exploring the history of Sudden Impact, Holmes interviews other people who achieved fame in the 1990s music industry.

== Production ==
In 1991 the band Sudden Impact appeared briefly in the music video for Boyz II Men's song "Motownphilly," which played frequently on MTV. After the video the band disappeared from the public eye. Dave Holmes took an interest in the band and their story, comparing the band's appearance to a teaser trailer for a movie that never came out.

The idea to create a project around the idea came up when Holmes realized his friend Scott M. Gimple shared his fascination with the Sudden Impact story. Holmes told Entertainment Weekly, "He is also somebody who remembers that moment really well, and when we first became friends and started talking about the weird obsessions that we share, a big show on the air was Bands Reunited on VH1. And we were like, we should get [Sudden Impact] back together and have them do the point. That was our little in-joke for a week, and it remained in the back of my mind and as my writing career took off, I was like, 'Is this a book or is it a long-form magazine piece?,' but I never quite fit it into the right template."

All 10 episodes were made available on October 12, 2021 on Stitcher Premium, and released weekly for free.

== Episodes ==
No.	Title	Original release date
1	"I've Been Thinking About You"	October 12, 2021
Dave Holmes explores pop music in America in 1991. He interviews friend and discovers a connection to the East Coast Family.
2	"Right Here, Right Now"	October 19, 2021
Holmes interviews Karen Kilgariff about her early career in the 1990s, and learns more about Sudden Impact.
3	"The Promise of a New Day"	October 26, 2021
Holmes interviews the singer Hayden Hadju about how he became involved in the East Coast Family and the end of his music career.
4	"Top of the World"	November 2, 2021
Holmes interviews Joey McIntyre from New Kids on the Block.
5	"Here We Go"	November 9, 2021
Sudden Impact member Aaron Kane discusses how the group was formed, met Michael Bivins, and ultimately broke up. Holmes also speaks with former MTV VJ Damien Fahey.
6	"Round and Round"	November 16, 2021
An interview with Sudden Impact producer Tim Byrd and a discussion of the pop culture landscape of the early 1990s.
7	"Get a Leg Up"	November 23, 2021
Dave interviews the lead singer of the band Dog's Eye View.
8	"One More Try"	November 30, 2021
A discussion of the music videos of the MTV era and an interview with Jme Stein who appeared in the music video for "Baby Baby."
