= List of The Daily Show episodes (2010) =

- No. of episodes: 161

Release
- Original network: Comedy Central, Cartoon Network

Season chronology
- ← Previous; 2009 episodes Next → 2011 episodes

This is a list of episodes for The Daily Show with Jon Stewart in 2010.

== 2010 ==
=== January ===
Date	Guest	Promotion
January 4	Michael Pollan	Book Food Rules: An Eater's Manual
January 5	George Lucas	Book George Lucas's Blockbusting
January 6	Michael Mullen	Chairman of the Joint Chiefs of Staff
January 7	Maggie Gyllenhaal	Film Crazy Heart
January 11	John Yoo	Book Crisis In Command
January 12	Paul Ingrassia	Book Crash Course
January 13	Ringo Starr and The Ben Harper Band	Album Y Not
January 14	Tom Brokaw	TV show NBC News
January 18	David M. Walker	Book Comeback America
January 19	Colin Firth	Film A Single Man
January 20	Jim Wallis	Book Rediscovering Values
January 21	Julie Andrews	Film Tooth Fairy
January 25	Bill Gates	Bill & Melinda Gates Foundation
January 26	Elizabeth Warren	Chair, TARP Congressional Oversight Panel
January 27	Ethan Watters	Book Crazy Like Us
January 28	Doris Kearns Goodwin	

=== February ===
Date	Guest	Promotion
February 1	Austan Goolsbee	Member, Council of Economic Advisers
February 2	Brian Williams	TV show NBC Nightly News
February 3	Atul Gawande	Book The Checklist Manifesto: How to Get Things Right
February 4	Anthony Weiner	
February 8	Jenny Sanford	Book Staying True
February 9	Newt Gingrich	
February 10	Willie Mays	
February 11	Lee Daniels	Film Precious: Based on the Novel "Push" by Sapphire
February 22	Ricky Gervais	TV show The Ricky Gervais Show
February 23	Jeff Garlin	
February 24	Tracy Morgan	Film Cop Out (2010 film)
February 25	Rep. James Clyburn	

=== March ===
Date	Guest	Promotion
March 1	Neil DeGrasse Tyson	PBS Special The Pluto Files
March 2	Robert Pattinson	Film Remember Me
March 3	Lynne Olson	Book Citizens of London
March 4	Scott Patterson	Book The Quants: How a New Breed of Math Whizzes Conquered Wall Street and Nearly Destroyed It
March 8	Harry Markopolos	Book No One Would Listen
March 9	Marc Thiessen	Book Courting Disaster: How the CIA Kept America Safe and How Barack Obama Is Inviting the Next Attack
March 10	Jerry Seinfeld	The Marriage Ref
March 11	Eamon Javers	Book Broker, Trader, Lawyer, Spy: The Secret World of Corporate Espionage
March 15	Michael Lewis	Book The Big Short: Inside the Doomsday Machine
March 16	Jude Law	Film Repo Men
March 17	Snoop Dogg	Album More Malice
March 18	Gary Locke	United States Secretary of Commerce
March 29	Ben Stiller	Film Greenberg
March 30	Robin Williams	DVD Weapons of Self Destruction
March 31	Roxana Saberi	Book Between Two Worlds: My Life and Captivity in Iran ISBN 978-0-06-196528-9

=== April ===
Date	Guest	Promotion
April 1	Liz Claman	TV show Countdown to the Closing Bell (anchor)
April 5	Reza Aslan	Book Beyond Fundamentalism: Confronting Religious Extremism in a Globalized Age. (paperback version of How to Win a Cosmic War: God, Globalization, and the End of the War on Terror ISBN 978-1-4000-6672-8)
April 6	Captain Richard Phillips	Book A Captain's Duty: Somali Pirates, Navy SEALs, and Dangerous Days at Sea.
April 7	Steve Carell	Film Date Night
April 8	David Remnick	Book Remnick, David (March 11, 2024). The Bridge: The Life and Rise of Barack Obama. Alfred A. Knopf. ISBN 978-1-4000-4360-6.
April 12	Bryan Cranston	TV show Breaking Bad
April 13	Rachel Maddow	TV show The Rachel Maddow Show
April 14	Richard Burt	Global Zero (chair)
April 15	Tracy Morgan	Film Death at a Funeral
April 19	John Dingell	Congressman (D-Michigan)
April 20	John M. O'Hara	Book O'Hara, John M. (January 12, 2010). A New American Tea Party. Wiley. ISBN 978-0-470-56798-2.; Illinois Policy Institute
April 21	Fred Pearce	Book Peoplequake: Mass Migration, Ageing Nations, and the Coming Population Crash
April 22	Zoe Saldaña	Film The Losers
April 26	Lisa P. Jackson	EPA (administrator)
April 27	Richard Whittle	Book The Dream Machine: The Untold Story of the Notorious V-22 Osprey.
April 28	Ken Blackwell	Book Kenneth Blackwell, J.; Klukowski, Ken (2010). The Blueprint: Obama's Plan to Subvert the Constitution and Build an Imperial Presidency. Lyons Press. ISBN 978-0-7627-6134-0.
April 29	Michael Caine	Film Harry Brown

=== May ===
Date	Guest	Promotion
May 3	Jonathan Eig	Book Eig, Jonathan (April 27, 2010). Get Capone: The Secret Plot That Captured America's Most Wanted Gangster. Simon & Schuster. ISBN 978-1-4165-8059-1.
May 4	Rosalynn Carter	Book Carter, Rosalynn; Golant, Susan K.; Cade, Kathryn E. (April 27, 2010). Within Our Reach: Ending the Mental Health Crisis. Rodale Books. ISBN 978-1-59486-881-8.
May 5	Jon Meacham	Editor of Newsweek
May 6	Mario Batali	Book Batali, Mario (April 6, 2010). Molto Gusto: Easy Italian Cooking. HarperCollins. ISBN 978-0-06-192432-3.
May 10	Jack Rakove	Book Rakove, Jack N. (March 11, 2024). Revolutionaries: A New History of the Invention of America. Houghton Mifflin Harcourt. ISBN 978-0-618-26746-0.
May 11	Sebastian Junger	Book Junger, Sebastian (May 25, 2010). War. HarperCollins. ISBN 978-1-55468-554-7.
May 12	Michael Patrick King	Film Sex and the City 2 (director)
May 13	Ian Bremmer	Book Bremmer, Ian (2010). The End Of The Free Market. Portfolio. ISBN 978-1-59184-301-6.

=== June ===
Date	Guest	Promotion
June 1	Arthur C. Brooks	Brooks, Arthur C. (May 25, 2010). The Battle: How the Fight between Free Enterprise and Big Government Will Shape America's Future. Basic Books. ISBN 978-0-465-01938-0.
June 2	Morgan Freeman	Through the Wormhole (series)
June 3	Jonah Hill	Actor
June 7	John C. Reilly	Cyrus (film)
June 8	Christopher Hitchens	Hitchens, Christopher (June 3, 2011). Hitch-22: A Memoir. Grand Central. ISBN 978-0-446-54033-9.
June 9	Spencer Wells	Wells, Spencer (2010). Pandora's Seed: The Unforeseen Cost of Civilization. Random House. ISBN 978-1-4000-6215-7.
June 10	Tim Pawlenty	Governor of Minnesota
June 14	Betty White	Hot in Cleveland (sitcom)
June 15	James M. Tabor	Tabor, James M. (March 11, 2024). Blind Descent: The Quest to Discover the Deepest Place on Earth. Random House. ISBN 978-1-4000-6767-1.
June 16	Louis C.K.	Louie (TV series)
June 17	Fred Thompson	Thompson, Fred (May 18, 2010). Teaching the Pig to Dance: A Memoir of Growing Up and Second Chances. Crown Forum. ISBN 978-0-307-46028-8.
June 21	Josh Fox	Gasland (documentary film)
June 22	Cameron Diaz	Knight and Day (film)
June 23	Dr. Connie Mariano	Mariano, Connie (June 22, 2010). The White House Doctor. St. Martin's Press. ISBN 978-0-312-53483-7.
June 24	Adam Sandler and Chris Rock	Grown Ups (2010 film)
June 28	David Axelrod	Senior Advisor to President Obama
June 29	Helen Mirren	Love Ranch (film)
June 30	Landon Donovan and Bob Bradley	U.S. Soccer Team

=== July ===
Date	Guest	Promotion
July 1	Jere Van Dyk	Dyk, Jere Van (June 22, 2010). Captive: My Time as a Prisoner of the Taliban. Henry Holt and Company. ISBN 978-0-8050-8827-4.
July 5	Denis Leary	Rescue Me (TV series)
July 6	Julianne Moore	The Kids Are All Right (film)
July 7	Daniel Okrent	Last Call: The Rise and Fall of Prohibition. ISBN 978-0-7432-7702-0.
July 8	Marilynne Robinson	Robinson, Marilynne (2010). Absence of Mind: The Dispelling of Inwardness from the Modern Myth of the Self. Yale University Press. ISBN 978-0-300-14518-2.
July 26	William Rosen	Rosen, William (2010). The Most Powerful Idea in the World: A Story of Steam, Industry, and Invention. Random House. ISBN 978-1-4000-6705-3.
July 27	Fareed Zakaria	Fareed Zakaria GPS (show)
July 28	Robert O'Connell	O'Connell, Robert L. (2010). The Ghosts of Cannae. Hannibal and the Darkest Hour of the Roman Republic. ISBN 978-1-4000-6702-2.
July 29	Liev Schreiber	Salt (2010 film)

=== August ===
Date	Guest	Promotion
August 2	Mary Roach	Roach, Mary (August 17, 2010). Packing for Mars: The Curious Science of Life in the Void. ISBN 978-0-393-06847-4.
August 3	Will Ferrell (along with Rob Riggle)	The Other Guys (film)
August 4	Bruce B. Henderson	Henderson, Bruce (June 29, 2010). Hero Found. ISBN 978-0-06-157136-7.
August 5	Akbar Ahmed	Ahmed, Akbar S. (2010). Journey into America: The Challenge of Islam. ISBN 978-0-8157-0387-7.
August 10	Jason Bateman	The Switch (film)
August 11	Laura Linney	The Big C (TV series)
August 12	Arcade Fire	The Suburbs (Arcade Fire album)
August 16	Emma Thompson	Nanny McPhee Returns
August 17	Dick Armey	Armey, Dick; Kibbe, Matt (August 17, 2010). Give Us Liberty. ISBN 978-0-06-201587-7.
August 18	Edward P. Kohn	Kohn, Edward P. (July 27, 2010). Hot Time in the Old Town: The Great Heat Wave of 1896 and the Making of Theodore Roosevelt. Basic Books. ISBN 978-0-465-01336-4.
August 19	Jennifer Aniston	The Switch (film)
August 23	Rod Blagojevich	Former Governor of Illinois
August 24	Brian Williams	NBC Nightly News
August 25	Drew Barrymore	Going the Distance (2010 film)
August 26	Michael Bloomberg	Mayor of New York City

=== September ===
Date	Guest	Promotion
September 7	Tim Gunn	Gunn, Tim; Calhoun, Ada (September 7, 2010). Gunn's Golden Rules: Life's Little Lessons for Making It Work. Simon and Schuster. ISBN 978-1-4391-7656-6.
September 8	Tim Kaine	Democratic National Committee
September 9	Meghan McCain	McCain, Meghan (August 31, 2010). Dirty Sexy Politics. Hyperion Books. ISBN 978-1-4013-2377-6.
September 13	Ben Affleck	The Town (2010 film)
September 14	Tony Blair	Blair, Tony (March 11, 2024). A Journey. Alfred A. Knopf. ISBN 978-0-307-26983-6.
September 15	Jon Hamm	The Town (2010 film)
September 16	President Bill Clinton	Clinton Global Initiative
September 20	President Jimmy Carter	Carter, Jimmy (2010). White House Diary. Farrar, Straus and Giroux. ISBN 978-0-374-28099-4.
September 21	Sigourney Weaver	You Again (film)
September 22	Edward Norton	Stone (2010 film)
September 23	H.M. Abdullah II	King of Jordan
September 27	Bill O'Reilly	O'Reilly, Bill (September 14, 2010). Pinheads and Patriots: Where You Stand in the Age of Obama. HarperCollins. ISBN 978-0-06-195071-1.
September 28	Arianna Huffington	Huffington, Arianna Stassinopoulos (March 11, 2024). Third World America: How Our Politicians Are Abandoning the Middle Class and Betraying the American Dream. Crown Publishers. ISBN 978-0-307-71982-9.
September 29	Linda Polman	Polman, Linda (September 14, 2010). The Crisis Caravan: What's Wrong with Humanitarian Aid?. Henry Holt and Company. ISBN 978-0-8050-9290-5.
September 30	Justin Timberlake	The Social Network (film)

=== October ===
Date	Guest	Promotion
October 4	Sam Harris	Harris, Sam (October 5, 2010). The Moral Landscape: How Science Can Determine Human Values. Free Press. ISBN 978-1-4391-7121-9.
October 5	Bruce Willis	Red (2010 film)
October 6	Philip Dray	Dray, Philip (2010). There is Power in a Union: The Epic Story of Labor in America. Doubleday. ISBN 978-0-385-52629-6.
October 7	Naomi Watts	Fair Game (2010 film)
October 11	Johnny Knoxville	Jackass 3D
October 12	Eric Cantor	Cantor, Eric; Ryan, Paul; McCarthy, Kevin (September 14, 2010). Young Guns: A New Generation of Conservative Leaders. Threshold Editions. ISBN 978-1-4516-0734-5.
October 13	Condoleezza Rice	Extraordinary, Ordinary People: A Memoir of Family. Crown Publishers. 2010. ISBN 978-0-307-58787-9.
October 14	David Rakoff	Half Empty. ISBN 978-0-385-52524-4.
October 25	Austan Goolsbee	Troubled Asset Relief Program (TARP)
October 26	Ted Kaufman	United States Senator
October 27	President Barack Obama	2010 midterm elections
October 28	none	2010 midterm elections

=== November ===
Date	Guest	Promotion
November 1	Zach Galifianakis	Due Date (film)
November 2	Michael Beschloss	Presidential Courage. 2007. ISBN 978-0-684-85705-3.
November 3	Chris Wallace	Fox News Sunday
November 4	David Sedaris	Sedaris, David (September 28, 2010). Squirrel Seeks Chipmunk: A Modest Bestiary. Little, Brown. ISBN 978-0-316-03839-3.
November 8	Rick Perry	Perry, Rick (2010). Fed Up!. Little, Brown. ISBN 978-0-316-13295-4.
November 9	Harrison Ford	Morning Glory (2010 film)
November 10	Mick Foley	Foley, Mick (October 2010). Countdown to Lockdown: A Hardcore Journal. Grand Central. ISBN 978-0-446-56461-8.
November 11	Rosario Dawson	Unstoppable (2010 film)
November 15	Marion Jones	Jones, Marion (October 26, 2010). On the Right Track. Howard Books. ISBN 978-1-4516-1082-6.
November 16	Bethany McLean and Joe Nocera	McLean, Bethany; Nocera, Joseph (March 11, 2024). All the Devils Are Here: The Hidden History of the Financial Crisis. Portfolio/Penguin. ISBN 978-1-59184-363-4.
November 17	Jay-Z	Jay-z (November 16, 2010). Decoded. Random House Publishing. ISBN 978-1-4000-6892-0.
November 18	Philip K. Howard	Howard, Philip K. (January 26, 2010). Life Without Lawyers: Restoring Responsibility in America. W. W. Norton. ISBN 978-0-393-33803-4.
November 29	Judah Friedlander	Friedlander, Judah (October 5, 2010). How to Beat Up Anybody. HarperCollins. ISBN 978-0-06-196977-5.
November 30	Susan Casey	Casey, Susan (2010). The Wave: In the Pursuit of the Rogues, Freaks and Giants of the Ocean. Doubleday Canada. ISBN 978-0-385-66667-1.

=== December ===
Date	Guest	Promotion
December 1	Sting	Live In Berlin
December 2	Stacy Schiff	Cleopatra: A Life. ISBN 978-0-316-00192-2.
December 6	Hugh Shelton	Shelton, Hugh; Levinson, Ronald; McConnell, Malcolm (October 12, 2010). Without Hesitation: The Odyssey of an American Warrior. St. Martin's Press. ISBN 978-0-312-59905-8.
December 7	Seth Green	Robot Chicken (TV series)
December 8	Michelle Williams	Blue Valentine (film)
December 9	Edmund Morris	Morris, Edmund (November 23, 2010). Colonel Roosevelt. Random House Publishing. ISBN 978-0-375-50487-7.
December 13	Gordon Brown	Brown, Gordon (December 7, 2010). Beyond the Crash: Overcoming the First Crisis of Globalization. Free Press. ISBN 978-1-4516-2405-2.
December 14	Ricky Gervais	Out of England 2 (HBO Stand-Up Comedy Special)
December 15	Paul Rudd	How Do You Know (film)
December 16	Mike Huckabee	Huckabee, Mike (2010). Can't Wait Till Christmas. ISBN 978-0-399-25539-7.
