= This Podcast Will Kill You =

Podcast about disease biology, history, and epidemiology

- Genre: Medical
- Language: English

Cast and voices
- Hosted by: Erin Allmann Updyke; Erin Welsh

Publication
- Original release: October 31, 2017
- Provider: Exactly Right
- Updates: Bi-weekly on Tuesdays

Related
- Website: https://thispodcastwillkillyou.com

This Podcast Will Kill You is an American podcast hosted by disease ecologists and epidemiologists Erin Welsh and Erin Allmann Updyke. Its first full-length episode was released on October 31, 2017. New episodes were released weekly until the second season, when they were released every two weeks. Each week a different disease is covered, the majority of which are infectious diseases with some exceptions, such as scurvy in episode 19.

"This Podcast Will Kill You" is part of the Exactly Right Podcast Network, created by the hosts of "My Favorite Murder."

== Structure of Episodes ==
Each episode is about an hour in duration and generally starts with a firsthand account of someone affected by the disease. After that, the hosts create a mixed drink that is connected to the disease, called a 'Quarantini', in a segment known as 'Quarantini time'. After this introduction, the biology of the disease is explained, then history, epidemiology, and finally, the disease's effect on the modern world. Generally, Welsh tells the history of the disease and Updyke explains the biology epidemiology. Finally, the hosts cite the sources used to present the information, and supply a link to their website where the sources can be found.

== History ==
Erin Allmann Updyke, co-host, has an M.S. in epidemiology from the University of Hawaii and a Ph.D. in entomology and an M.D. from the University of Illinois at Urbana-Champaign. Erin Welsh, co-host, has an M.S. in epidemiology from the University of Louisville and a Ph.D. in Ecology, Evolution, and Conservation Biology from the University of Illinois at Urbana-Champaign. "The Erins," as they've coined themselves, started "This Podcast Will Kill You" because they felt that the medical knowledge that they have gained from their education rarely transfers out of the academia world. They wanted to make medical knowledge more accessible and easier to understand to the general public, without diluting it. Their first episode aired on October 31, 2017. In 2018, prior to launching Season 2, "This Podcast Will Kill You" joined The Exactly Right Network. In doing so, their downloads rose four times. The show was nominated for a 2019 Webby Award in the Science and Education Podcasts category. In 2020, they started a special series of episodes focusing on the COVID-19 pandemic. In 2023, Season 6 featured a miniseries of bonus episodes focussing on popular science books, "TPWKY book club".

== List of Episodes ==
=== Season 1 ===
Date	Episode	Title
October 23, 2017	0	Trailer
October 31, 2017	1	Influenza Will Kill You
November 7, 2017	2	[Leprosy:] Skin in the Game, Horse in the Race
November 14, 2017	3	[Smallpox:] Gnarlypox
November 21, 2017	4	[Cholera:] The Poop Show
November 28, 2017	5	Plague Part I: The GMOAT
December 5, 2017	6	Plague Part II: TGFA
December 12, 2017	7	Hit Me With Your Best (Polio) Shot
December 19, 2017	8	ABRACADABRA - Go Away Malaria!
January 2, 2018	9	Tuberculosis: A Slow Burn
January 9, 2018	10	Yellow Fever: Is there a Hamilton song about this?
January 16, 2018	11	Ebola: The New Kid on the Block
January 23, 2018	12	HIV/AIDS: Apathy Will Kill You
January 30, 2018	13	Bonus Episode: HIV/AIDS
February 27, 2018	-	Don't Tread on my Monkshood: Crossover with IDOP

=== Season 2 ===
Date	Episode	Title
November 27, 2018	14	Rabies, Don't dilute me, bro
December 11, 2018	15	MRSA: Make resistance Susceptible Again
December 24, 2018	16	Scratch and Sniff Diphtheria Membrane
January 8, 2019	17	Oh No Tetrodo: Crossover with TBOSP
January 22, 2019	18	Hantavirus: The Real Rat Race
February 5, 2019	19	Scurvy: Thanks a lot, evolution
February 20, 2019	20	Prions: Apocalypse Cow
March 5, 2019	21	Measles: The Worst Souvenir
March 19, 2019	22	Belladonna will dilate your mind: Crossover with IDOP
April 2, 2019	23	Opening a can of Hookworms
April 16, 2019	24	Zika: Rumors and Rumours
April 30, 2019	25	Put your hands together for: Gonorrhea!
May 16, 2019	26	Vaccines Part I: Let's hear it for Maurice
May 21, 2019	27	Vaccines Part II: Have you thanks your immune system lately?
May 28, 2019	28	H.pylori: Don't try this at home
June 11, 2019	29	Aspirin the Wonder Drug: Crossover w/ IDOP
June 25, 2019	30	Encephalitis Lethargica: Sleep Perchance to Dream (& Dream & Dream)
July 9, 2019	31	Giardia: Gerardia
July 23, 2019	32	Ask the Erins
August 6, 2019	33	Chytrid: The Silent Forest
August 20, 2019	34	Cystic Fibrosis: Complete Somatic Rebellion
September 3, 2019	35	Lyme Disease: I'd like to check you for ticks

=== Season 3 ===
Date	Episode	Title
October 29, 2019	36	Shades of Syphilis
November 12, 2019	37	E. coli (unless it's beets)
November 26, 2019	38	Lead Poisoning: Heavy Metal Episode
December 10, 2019	39	Toxoplasmosis: Calling All Cats
December 24, 2019	40	Dancing Plague: Worst Dance Party Ever
January 7, 2020	41	Ricin: A Bad Seed (crossover with IDOP)
January 21, 2020	42	Dandy Dengue Fever
February 4, 2020	43	M-m-m-my Coronaviruses
February 18, 2020	44	Pertussis: Whoop Here It Is
March 3, 2020	45	Hepatitis C: Hepatiti?
March 17, 2020	46	Lactose Intolerance: Never trust a fart
March 31, 2020	47	Schistosomiasis: A Snail's Pace
April 14, 2020	48	Botulism: Why are you the way you are?
April 28, 2020	49	Eastern Equine Encephalitis: Triple EEEk!
May 12, 2020	50	Antibiotics: We owe it all to chemistry!
May 26, 2020	51	The Path of Most (Antibiotic) Resistance
June 23, 2020	52	Rinderpest: Moo Cows, Moo Problems
July 7, 2020	53	Radiation: X-Ray Marks the Spot
July 21, 2020	54	Wake up and Smell the Caffeine
August 4, 2020	55	Rocky Mountain spotted fever: the Tick must be destroyed!
August 18, 2020	56	Sickle Cell Disease: Invisible Illness, Enduring Strength
September 1, 2020	57	Herpes: Stop the STIgma
September 15, 2020	58	Guinea worm: (Almost) Ancient History
September 29, 2020	59	Thalidomide: Justice Delayed, Justice Denied
October 13, 2020	60	Giving birth to "the pill"

=== Season 4 ===
Date	Episode	Title
December 1, 2020	61	Typhoid: There's Something About Mary
December 15, 2020	62	Leishmaniasis, Relationship Status: It's Complicated
December 29, 2020	63	Poison Ivy: It's Just Us
January 12, 2021	64	Rubella: Timing is Everything
January 26, 2021	65	Sweating Sickness: Ready, Sweat, Go!
February 9, 2021	66	The Outs and Ins of Organ Transplantation
February 23, 2021	67	HPV: My wart be with you
March 9, 2021	68	Coccidioidomycosis: It's never a spider bite
March 23, 2021	69	Huntington's disease: Let's talk frankly
April 6, 2021	70	Henrietta Lacks: HeLa There, & Everywhere
April 20, 2021	71	Onchocerciasis/River Blindness: So many mysteries
May 4, 2021	72	White-Nose Syndrome: How deep is your torpor?
May 18, 2021	73	Puerperal Fever: Seriously, wash your hands
June 1, 2021	74	Naegleria fowleri: The "brain eating amoeba"
June 15, 2021	75	Mercury: The cost of progress
June 29, 2021	76	Chickenpox: There's always a ‘but’
July 13, 2021	77	Legionnaires’ Disease: A Killer Mist
July 27, 2021	78	Bartonella: Keep Calm and Carrión
August 10, 2021	79	Hemophilia: A Hemorrhagic Disposition
August 24, 2021	80	Dysentery loves a disaster
September 7, 2021	81	Chagas disease: The Reverse Triple Discovery
September 21, 2021	82	Anthrax: The Hardcore Spore
October 5, 2021	83	Diabetes: Short & Sweet
October 19, 2021	84	West Nile virus: The Crow in the Coal Mine
November 2, 2021	85	Alcohol: Beer for Thought

=== Season 5 ===
In Season 5, a few of the regular podcast episodes were followed by a special episode often going deeper into detail on what was covered in the previous episode.

Date	Episode	Title
December 14, 2021	86	Typhus: Another lousy episode
December 28, 2021	87	C. diff: Fighting poop with poop
January 11, 2022	88	Endometriosis: menstrual backwash
January 25, 2022	89	Hepatitis B: Hepatiti, Take 2
February 1, 2022	Special	Special Episode: Hep B stigma & discrimination
February 8, 2022	90	Human African Trypanosomiasis: A lot to unpack
February 15, 2022	Special	Special Episode: Human African Trypanosomiasis & drug development
February 22, 2022	91	Myxomatosis: Down the rabbit hole
March 1, 2022	Special	Special Episode: Rabbit Hemorrhagic Disease Virus
March 8, 2022	92	Multiple Sclerosis: Scarred nerves & skating saints
March 15, 2022	Special	Special Episode: Epstein-Barr virus
March 22, 2022	93	Lightning & Other Stories: Power Hour (and a Half)
March 29, 2022	Special	Special Episode: Electricity
April 19, 2022	94	Chlamydia: Double Trouble
April 26, 2022	Special	Special Episode: Chlamydia, Koalas and More!
May 3, 2022	95	Tetanus: An inhuman calamity!
May 10, 2022	Special	Special Episode: On the Origin of Epidemiology
May 17, 2022	96	Tapeworm: We encyst you listen
May 24, 2022	Special	Special Episode: Coprolites!
May 31, 2022	97	Snake Venoms: Collateral Damage
June 7, 2022	Special	Special Episode: Snake Venom Evolution
June 14, 2022	98	Folate: Marmite, anyone?
June 28, 2022	99	Salmonella: A hard egg to crack
July 12, 2022	100	Monkeypox: Here we go again?
July 26, 2022	101	Immortality; This Podcast Won't Kill You
August 9, 2022	102	Arsenic: Paris Green with Envy
August 31, 2022	103	Leptospirosis: Don't blame the rats
September 6, 2022	104	The Bends: Industrial Revolution, Baby
September 20, 2022	105	Down in the Mumps
October 7, 2022	106	Turner Syndrome: Let's talk about X
November 4, 2022	107	Sepsis: It's a mess
November 4, 2022	108	Gout: Toetally fascinating
November 15, 2022	109	Chikungunya: Not dengue (or is it?)
November 29, 2022	110	Influenza, Take 2: Fowl Play

=== Season 6 ===
Date	Episode	Title
January 31, 2023	111	RSV: What's syncytial anyway
February 14, 2023	112	Epilepsy: It's always the phlegm
February 28, 2023	113	Vitamin D: The D stands for drama
March 14, 2023	114	Listeria: It put Dairy on the map
March 28, 2023	115	Altitude Sickness: Balloons though?
April 11, 2023	116	It's never lupus (except this time)
May 15, 2023	117	Bedbugs: Bug-bitten and bedeviled
June 6, 2023	118	Asbestos: Corruption and cancer and corporate greed, oh my!
July 4, 2023	119	Marburg virus: Too fast, too furious
July 18, 2023	120	Acetaminophen/Paracetamol: Pain. Killer
August 1, 2023	121	Tularemia: Hare today, gone tomorrow
August 15, 2023	122	Asthma: A phlegmy episode
August 29, 2023	123	Hand, Foot, and Mouth (and Butt?) Disease
September 12, 2023	124	The full spectrum of color vision deficiency
September 26, 2023	125	Blastomycosis: How fungus became amongus
October 10, 2023	126	Migraine: A Cacophany in Four Movements
October 24, 2023	127	Bhopal: The 1984 Union Carbide Disaster
November 7, 2023	128	Skin Cancer: We love and fear the sun
November 21, 2023	129	Lymphatic Filariasis: Hiding in plain sight
December 5, 2023	130	Cocoliztli: We do love a salty dish
December 19, 2023	131	Parkinson's Disease: Dopamine & discoveries
January 2, 2024	132	Osteogenesis Imperfecta: All bones about it
January 16, 2024	133	Parvoviruses: Who let the dogs (and their viruses) out?
January 30, 2024	134	Tonsils: Underestimated and underappreciated
February 13, 2024	135	Menopause is whatever you want it to be

=== Season 7 ===
Date	Episode	Title
April 9, 2024	136	Long Covid: A long time coming
April 16, 2024	137	ME/CFS: What's in a name? (A lot, actually)
April 30, 2024	138	Fever: Take it to the limit
May 7, 2024	139	Supplements: "This statement has not been evaluated by the FDA"
May 21, 2024	140	Nipah virus: Of Fruit and Bats
May 28, 2024	141	Maggots: Such noble work
June 11, 2024	142	Leeches: It's stronger than magic, it's nature
June 25, 2024	143	IVF, Part 1: Infertility
July 2, 2024	144	IVF, Part 2: Invention
July 9, 2024	145	IVF, Part 3: Industry
July 23, 2024	146	Celiac Disease: Rootin tootin gluten
July 30, 2024	147	Tasmanian Devil Facial Tumor Disease: Sympathy for the Devil
August 13, 2024	148	Poison Control Part 1: Who you gonna call?
August 20, 2024	149	Poison Control Part 2: Call me maybe
September 3, 2024	150	Norovirus: Tip of the poop iceberg
September 10, 2024	151	Stethoscope: Lub dub
September 24, 2024	152	Hemochromatosis: Ironing out the details
October 1, 2024	153	Alpha-Gal Syndrome: A tick bite gone bad
October 15, 2024	154	Ask the Erins (Again)
October 22, 2024	155	Stiff Person Syndrome: A rare disease in the spotlight
November 5, 2024	156	Retinoids Part 1: How it started...
November 12, 2024	157	Retinoids Part 2: ... how it's going
November 26, 2024	158	Scarlet Fever: You've changed
December 3, 2024	159	Scabies: Tiny but Mite-y
December 10, 2024	160	Appendicitis: Don't know what you've got til it's gone?
January 7, 2025	161	Allergies Part 1: Pollens, nuts, & bugs
January 14, 2025	162	Allergies Part 2: Shots, pills, & pens
January 28, 2025	163	Circadian Rhythm: Live from Perth, Australia
February 4, 2025	164	Rift Valley Fever: Ruminating on ruminants
February 11, 2025	165	Fish Tongue Parasite: Parasite Appreciation Hour
February 18, 2025	166	Amanita Poisoning: Death cap-tivating
February 25, 2025	167	Viagra/Sildenafil: Raising the bar
March 11, 2025	168	Pregnancy: Act 1
March 18, 2025	169	Pregnancy: Act 2
March 25, 2025	170	Pregnancy: Act 3
April 1, 2025	171	Pregnancy: Act 4

=== Season 8 ===
Date	Episode	Title
April 8, 2025	172	Childhood Vaccine Schedule 1: Let's give it at shot
April 17, 2025	173	Childhood Vaccine Schedule 2: Who's making the call?
April 29, 2025	174	What's the deal with raw milk: Part 1
May 6, 2025	175	What's the deal with raw milk: Part 2
May 20, 2025	176	Strychnine: The WD-40 of Victorian Medicine
May 27, 2025	177	Toxic Shock Syndrome: A shock to the system
June 10, 2025	178	Fluoride 1: The real tooth fairy
June 17, 2025	179	Fluoride 2: Fighting tooth and nail
July 1, 2025	180	Food Dyes: It’s all marketing
July 8, 2025	181	PCOS: Beyond the cysts
July 22, 2025	182	SSRIs Part 1: Origin
July 29, 2025	183	SSRIs Part 2: Action
August 12, 2025	184	The Gallbladder: Humor us
August 19, 2025	185	The Great Smog of London: “Thick, drab, yellow, disgusting”
September 2, 2025	186	Hypothermia Part 1: How it hurts
September 9, 2025	187	Hypothermia Part 2: How it helps
September 23, 2025	188	Candida yeast: Here, there, and everywhere
September 30, 2025	189	Newborn screening: The future is here
October 14, 2025	190	Starvation: More than hunger
October 21, 2025	191	Famine: More than starvation
November 4, 2025	192	New World Screwworm: Oh-oh here they come
November 11, 2025	193	Necrotizing Fasciitis: A strange beast
November 25, 2025	194	Salt Part 1: The Seasoning
December 2, 2025	195	Salt Part 2: The Substance
December 16, 2025	196	Health Myths: Fact or fiction?

=== COVID-19 Series ===
To discuss the ongoing COVID-19 pandemic, the podcast introduced "The Anatomy of a Pandemic" series in which each episode tackles a particular aspect of COVID-19. This mini-series not only addresses the virus itself, but also addresses how it can impact mental health and cause societal disarray. The series reached its tentative end with Chapter 19.

Season	Date	Episode	Title
Special	March 23, 2020	Chapter 1	COVID-19: Virology
Special	March 23, 2020	Chapter 2	COVID-19: Disease
Special	March 23, 2020	Chapter 3	COVID-19: Control
Special	March 23, 2020	Chapter 4	COVID-19: Epidemiology
Special	March 23, 2020	Chapter 5	COVID-19: Vaccines
Special	March 23, 2020	Chapter 6	COVID-19: Mental Health
Special	April 6, 2020	Chapter 7	COVID-19: Spillover
Special	April 9, 2020	Chapter 8	COVID-19: Disparities
Special	April 20, 2020	Chapter 9	COVID-19: Economics
Special	April 23, 2020	Chapter 10	COVID-19: Schools
Special	May 4, 2020	Chapter 11	COVID-19: Modeling (Institute for Disease Modeling interview)
Special	December 10, 2020	Chapter 12	Control, Take 2
Special	December 22, 2020	Chapter 13	Vaccines, Take 2
Special	January 5, 2021	Chapter 14	Virology, Take 2
Special	March 30, 2021	Chapter 15	Disease, Take 2
Special	April 13, 2021	Chapter 16	Disparities, Take 2
Special	April 27, 2021	Chapter 17	Frontline Mental Health
Special	May 11, 2021	Chapter 18	Conservation & Pandemics
Special	May 25, 2021	Chapter 18	Your Stories
Special	June 8, 2021	Chapter 19	Looking forward by looking back

=== TPWKY Book club series ===
From Season 6 onwards, in between the regular episodes, several bonus episodes were released within a miniseries called the TPWKY Book club. These episodes feature interviews with authors of popular science books, covering topics ranging from why sweat matters to the history of food safety, from the menstrual cycle to the persistence of race science.

Season	Date	Title
6	February 21, 2023	Special Episode: David Quammen & Breathless
6	March 7, 2023	Special Episode: Sarah Everts & The Joy of Sweat
6	March 21, 2023	Special Episode: Angela Saini & Superior
6	April 25, 2023	Special Episode: Dr. Kate Clancy & Period
6	May 26, 2023	Special Episode: Mary Roach & Fuzz
6	June 20, 2023	Special Episode: Dr. Steven Thrasher & The Viral Underclass
6	July 11, 2023	Special Episode: Dr. Andrew Wehrmann & The Contagion of Liberty
6	July 26, 2023	Special Episode: Deborah Blum & The Poison Squad
6	August 8, 2023	Special Episode: Ed Yong & An Immense World
7	April 23, 2024	Special Episode: Dr. Deirdre Cooper Owens & Medical Bondage
7	May 14, 2024	Special Episode: Dr. Sara Manning Peskin & A Molecule Away from Madness
7	June 4, 2024	Special Episode: Dr. Paul Offit & Tell Me When It's Over
7	June 24, 2024	Special Episode: Dr. Noah Whiteman & Most Delicious Poison
7	July 16, 2024	Special Episode: Dr. Rageshri Dhairyawan & Unheard
7	August 6, 2024	Special Episode: Ben Goldfarb & Crossings
7	August 27, 2024	Special Episode: Maria Smilios & The Black Angels
7	September 17, 2024	Special Episode: Dan Egan & The Devil's Element
7	October 8, 2024	Special Episode: Dr. Charan Ranganath & Why We Remember
7	October 29, 2024	Special Episode: Kate Zernike & The Exceptions
7	November 19, 2024	Special Episode: Dr. Emily Monosson & Blight
7	December 17, 2024	Special Episode: Philip Eil & Prescription for Pain
7	January 21, 2025	Special Episode: Robert Alpert, Merle Eisenberg, Lee Mordechai & Diseased Cinema
7	March 4, 2025	Special Episode: Rachel Gross & Vagina Obscura
8	April 22, 2025	Special Episode: John Green & Everything Is Tuberculosis
8	May 13, 2025	Special Episode: Dr. Adam Ratner & Booster Shots
8	June 3, 2025	Special Episode: Dr. Wendy Kline & Exposed
8	June 24, 2025	Special Episode: Professor Steven Mithen & The Language Puzzle
8	July 15, 2025	Special Episode: Wendy Chin-Tanner & King of the Armadillos
8	August 5, 2025	Special Episode: Carl Zimmer & Airborne
8	August 26, 2025	Special Episode: Lina Zeldovich & The Living Medicine
8	September 16, 2025	Special Episode: Mary Roach & Replaceable You
8	October 7, 2025	Special Episode: Antonia Hylton & Madness
8	October 28, 2025	Special Episode: Dr. Lindsey Fitzharris and Adrian Teal & Dead Ends!
8	November 18, 2025	Special Episode: Gabriel Weston & Alive
8	December 9, 2025	Special Episode: Dr. Homer Venters & Outbreak Behind Bars

== See also ==
- List of history podcasts
