= Assassination Vacation =

2005 book by Sarah Vowell

- Author: Sarah Vowell
- Language: English
- Published: 2005
- Publisher: Simon & Schuster
- Publication place: United States

Assassination Vacation is a 2005 book by Sarah Vowell, in which she travels around the United States researching the assassinations of U.S. Presidents Abraham Lincoln, James A. Garfield and William McKinley. While most of the book is devoted to facts about the assassinated presidents and the men who would murder them, Vowell intersperses anecdotes of her self-proclaimed "pilgrimage" of presidential assassinations, including a production of the 1990 musical Assassins.

== Audiobook ==
An abridged audiobook was released by Simon & Schuster on March 29, 2005. It contained an ensemble cast, and original music was composed by Michael Giacchino. In order of appearance, the cast was:

- Conan O'Brien as Robert Todd Lincoln
- Eric Bogosian as John Wilkes Booth
- Stephen King as Abraham Lincoln
- Dave Eggers as Mike Ryan
- Catherine Keener as Gretchen Worden
- Jon Stewart as James A. Garfield
- Tony Kushner as John Humphrey Noyes
- Brad Bird as Charles Guiteau and Emma Goldman
- Daniel Handler as William McKinley
- Greg Giraldo as Theodore Roosevelt
- David Rakoff as Leon Czolgosz

== See also ==
- Assassination of Abraham Lincoln
- Assassination of James A. Garfield
- Assassination of William McKinley
