= Gastropod (podcast) =

Food podcast

- Genre: culinary; food; history; non-fiction; science

Cast and voices
- Hosted by: Nicola Twilley and Cynthia Graber

Production
- Production: Nicola Twilley and Cynthia Graber
- Length: approximately 22 to 56 minutes

Publication
- No. of episodes: 196 as of September 2022
- Original release: 2014 – present
- Updates: Biweekly

Reception
- Cited for: 2019 International Association of Culinary Professionals Best Podcast or Radio Show

Related
- Website: gastropod.com

Gastropod is a podcast about the science and history of food. It has aired since 2014 and is hosted by journalists Nicola Twilley and Cynthia Graber. Since 2021, it has been part of the Vox Media Podcast Network in partnership with Eater.

== Format and content ==
Gastropod is an independent podcast produced and hosted by Twilley and Graber, who interview chefs, scientists, and historians to collect stories about the science and history of food. They produce the podcast out of their homes in Somerville, Massachusetts and Los Angeles, California, respectively. Typical stories Twilley and Graber have shared on the show include Leonardo da Vinci inventing the first pasta machine, the effect of gold spoons on the flavor of foods, Jack Daniel learning how to make whiskey from an enslaved person from Africa, and the history of birthday cake. Episodes usually delve deeply into details about the historical, cultural, and scientific background of the episode's subject and feature interviews with multiple experts, sometimes recorded on location at laboratories, farm fields, or archaeological digs. Each episode is approximately fifty minutes and episodes are released every two weeks. In 2017, each episode had about 100,000 downloads.

== Awards ==
- The 2015 International Association of Culinary Professionals award for Best Culinary Audio Series (for the episode "The Golden Spoon")
- Regional 2015 Edward R. Murrow Award for Best Small Online News Organization Audio Documentary (for the episode "The Microbe Revolution")
- The 2019 International Association of Culinary Professionals award for Best Podcast or Radio Show.
- Nominee for Best Food Podcast at the 2019 iHeartRadio Podcast Awards.

== See also ==
- List of history podcasts
