= Exactly Right Podcast Network =

American podcast network

- Industry: Podcasting
- Founded: November 28, 2018; 7 years ago
- Founders: Karen Kilgariff; Georgia Hardstark
- Website: www.exactlyrightmedia.com

Exactly Right Podcast Network is an American podcast network founded by Georgia Hardstark and Karen Kilgariff in 2018. It produces 16 podcasts including My Favorite Murder, which Hardstark and Kilgariff have co-hosted since 2016.

== History ==
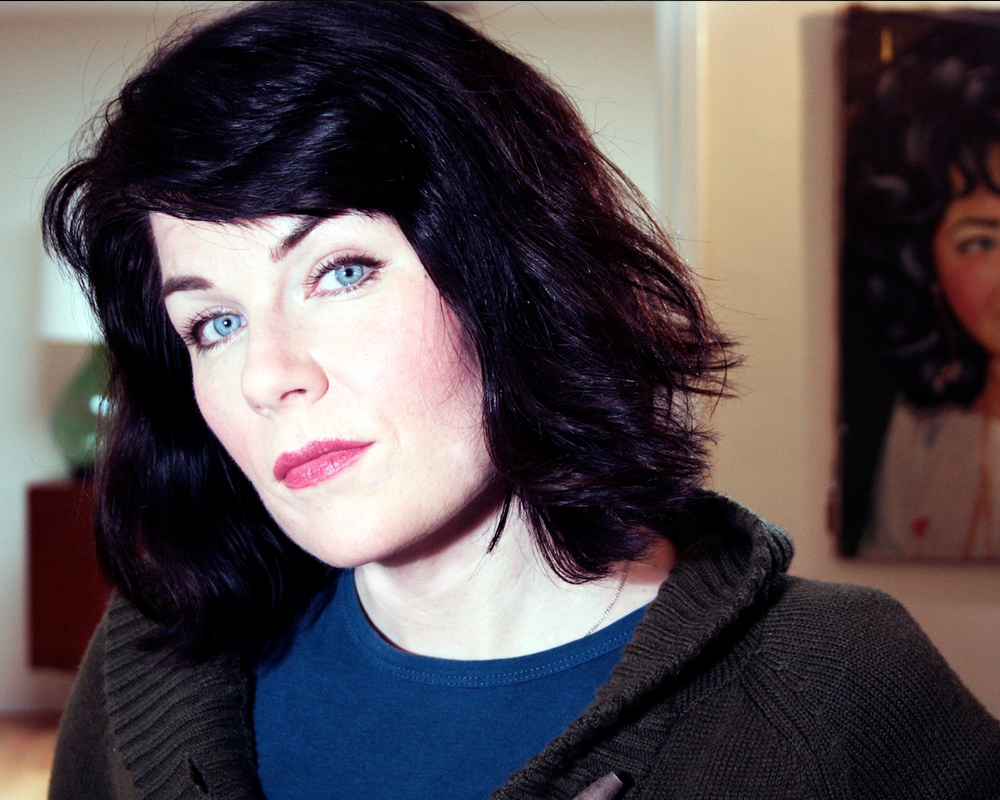
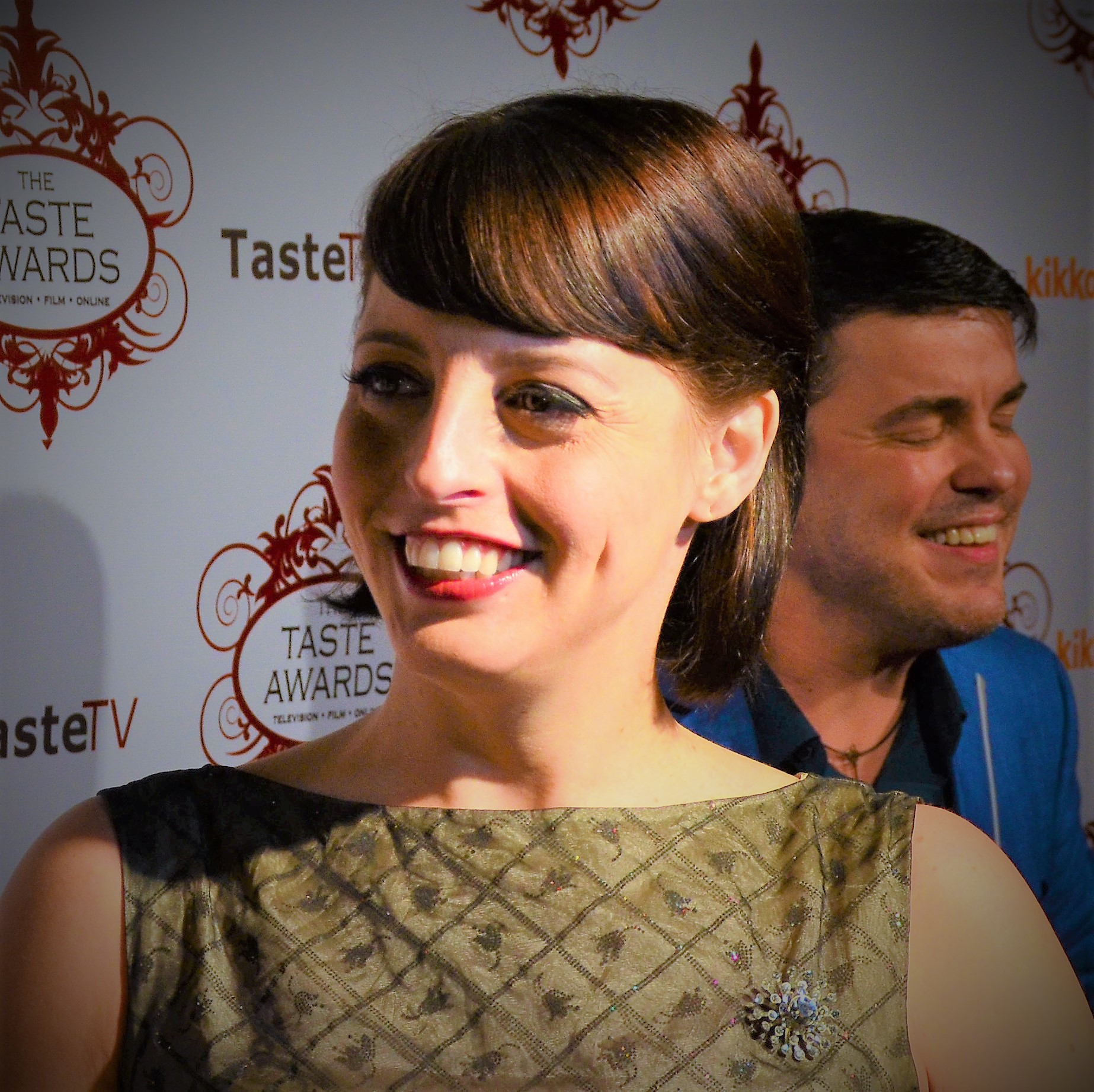
Founders of the network Karen Kilgariff (left) and Georgia Hardstark (right)

The creation of the network was announced on August 15, 2018, and officially launched on November 28, 2018 with five podcasts: My Favorite Murder, Do You Need A Ride?, This Podcast Will Kill You, The Purrrcast, and The Fall Line.

The network signed a two-year deal with Stitcher in 2019, which The Wall Street Journal estimated to be worth $10 million. As part of the deal, Stitcher provided additional funding, advertising, and development tools to the network, and set the plan to create over a dozen more podcasts.

In 2022, Exactly Right Media signed an ad sales and distribution agreement with Amazon and Wondery. Under the agreement, episodes of shows such as My Favorite Murder and This Podcast Will Kill You are available a week early in Amazon Music and Wondery+.

== Podcasts ==
=== Current podcasts ===
Title	Host(s)	Genre
My Favorite Murder	Georgia Hardstark and Karen Kilgariff	True Crime, Comedy
This Podcast Will Kill You	Erin Welsh and Erin Allmann Updyke	Infectious diseases
The Purrcast	Steven Ray Morris	Cats
Do You Need a Ride?	Chris Fairbanks and Karen Kilgariff	Comedy
I Said No Gifts!	Bridger Winegar	Comedy
Lady to Lady	Babs Gray, Brandie Posey, and Tess Barker	Comedy
Tenfold More Wicked	Kate Winkler Dawson	True Crime
Dear Movies, I Love You	Millie De Chirico and Casey O'Brien	Film
That's Messed Up: An SVU Podcast	Liza Treyger and Kara Klenk	Television
Bananas	Kurt Braunohler and Scotty Landes	Comedy, News
The True Beauty Brooklyn Podcast	Elizabeth Taylor and Alix Shapiro	Beauty
Tenfold More Wicked Presents: Wicked Words	Kate Winkler Dawson	True Crime
Parent Footprint with Dr. Dan	Dr. Dan Peters	Parenting
Waiting for Impact	Dave Holmes	Pop music history
Adulting with Michelle Buteau and Jordan Carlos	Michelle Buteau and Jordan Carlos	Advice
Buried Bones	Kate Winkler Dawson and Paul Holes	True Crime
Ghosted! by Roz Hernandez	Roz Hernandez	Comedy, paranormal

=== Former podcasts ===
Title	Host(s)	Genre
The Fall Line	Laurah Norton and Brooke Hargrove	True Crime
Jensen & Holes: The Murder Squad	Paul Holes and Billy Jensen	Unsolved Crime
I Saw What You Did	Danielle Henderson and Millie De Chirico	Film
