= Radio On: A Listener's Diary =

1997 book by Sarah Vowell

- Author: Sarah Vowell
- Language: English
- Genre: Memoir
- Publication date: 1997

Radio On: A Listener's Diary (1997) is the first book by Sarah Vowell. In the book, she writes about listening to the radio for an entire year, switching between rock stations, talk radio, and NPR. In the book she bemoans the state of radio in the United States, referring to it as a "dreary, intelligence-insulting, ugly, half-assed, audio compromise lorded over by the stultifying FCC."
