= Hero of Two Worlds: The Marquis de Lafayette in the Age of Revolution =

2021 nonfiction book by Mike Duncan

- Cover of the first edition
- Author: Mike Duncan
- Language: English
- Subject: History
- Publisher: PublicAffairs
- Publication date: August 24, 2021
- Publication place: United States
- Media type: Print
- Pages: 513
- ISBN: 978-1-5417-3033-5

Hero of Two Worlds: The Marquis de Lafayette in the Age of Revolution is a 2021 biography of Gilbert du Motier, the Marquis de Lafayette by American history podcaster and author Mike Duncan. It covers Lafayette's life and times and the significant role he played in the American Revolution, French Revolution, and July Revolution of 1830.

== Reception ==
This book has received generally positive reviews.

Jamelle Bouie from the New York Times thought that "through Lafayette’s adventures and misadventures...Duncan shows readers a Lafayette who...never fails to show the courage of his convictions and never flinches from a fight when his ideals are on the line...Time and again, Duncan shows Lafayette risking his life and reputation for his ideals."

Publishers Weekly said "Duncan marshals a wealth of information into a crisp and readable narrative. This sympathetic portrait illuminates the complexities of Lafayette and his revolutionary era."

Deborah Hopkinson of Book Page Magazine said that "in detailing Lafayette’s long career, Duncan takes a measured approach to his subject, making excellent use of primary sources, especially letters. The author effectively balances Lafayette the man with Lafayette the public figure and helps delineate the relationship between the United States and France." Hopkinson also notes that Duncan explores "...Lafayette’s long and enduring popularity with Americans."

== See also ==
- Lafayette in the Somewhat United States (2015) by Sarah Vowell
- Battle of Brandywine
- Battle of Yorktown
