= Fall of Civilizations (podcast) =

History podcast

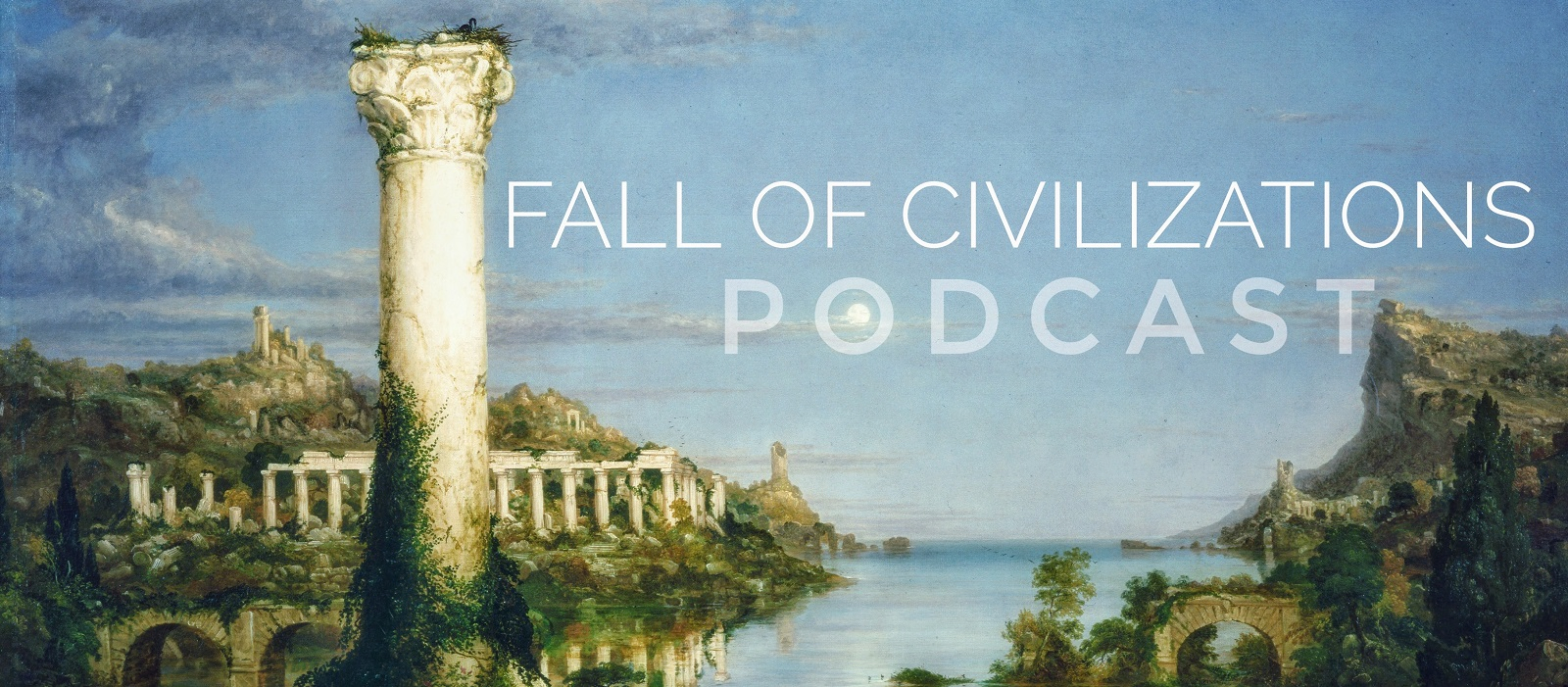
- Genre: History Podcast
- Language: English

Cast and voices
- Hosted by: Paul Cooper

Music
- Theme music composed by: John Bartmann

Publication
- No. of episodes: 21
- Original release: 2019

Related
- Website: https://fallofcivilizationspodcast.com

Fall of Civilizations is a popular history podcast produced by historian and novelist Paul Cooper. The show narrates the collapse of various societies throughout history, with a focus on the causes of the collapse and the experience of those who lived through times of upheaval.

== Production ==
Content is written by Paul Cooper, who has a PhD focusing on the cultural and literary significance of ruins. The episodes, which are often more than three hours long, are also narrated by Cooper. The use of voice actors, music (including recreated ancient music), and sound effects, all serve to create an immersive experience.

The final painting, "Desolation", in Thomas Cole's The Course of Empire painting series, features in the podcast's thumbnail.

== Episodes ==
Released since 2019, as of November 2026:

1. Roman Britain - The Work of Giants Crumbled
2. The Bronze Age Collapse - Mediterranean Apocalypse
3. The Mayan Collapse - Ruins Among the Trees
4. The Greenland Vikings - Land of the Midnight Sun
5. The Khmer Empire - Fall of the God Kings
6. Easter Island - Where Giants Walked
7. The Songhai Empire - Africa's Age of Gold
8. The Sumerians - Fall of the First Cities
9. The Aztecs - A Clash of Worlds
10. China's Han Dynasty - The First Empire in Flames
11. Byzantium - Last of the Romans
12. The Inca - Cities in the Cloud
13. The Assyrians - Empire of Iron
14. Vijayanagara - The Last Emperors of South India
15. The Nabataeans - The Final Days of Petra
16. Bagan - City of Temples
17. Carthage - Empire Of The Phoenicians
18. Egypt - Fall of the Pharaohs
19. The Mongols - Terror of the Steppe
20. Persia - An Empire in Ashes
21. Majapahit - Empire of the Islands

== Reception ==
Since its launch, it has had more than one hundred million downloads, and one and a half million YouTube subscribers. On IMDB, its rating is 9.4/10; the Apple Podcasts directory rates it 4.9/5.

Elon Musk has said he listens to the podcast, and in 2023 Cooper declined Musk's offer to publish it on Twitter, citing concerns with the platform's policies under his ownership.

== Book ==
Fall of Civilizations: Stories of Greatness and Decline, a book based on the podcast, was released in 2024 by Duckworth Books. It was a Blackwell's Book of the Month for April 2025, was a Sunday Times bestseller, and has received positive reviews.
