= Podcast Squared =

American pop culture podcast

- thumbnail art from the show
- Country of origin: United States

Creative team
- Developed by: Andrew Johnstone

Cast and voices
- Hosted by: Andrew Johnstone, Dave Biscella

Production
- Length: 1–2 hrs (approx)

Publication
- No. of episodes: 312
- Original release: June 2010 – April 2014
- Provider: The Lifestyle PodNetwork (2010–2012) Independent (2012–2014)

Related
- Website: www.andrewjohnstonedidymus.com

Podcast Squared was a weekly podcast that began in June 2010 as a way to discuss topics that are important in podcast culture.

== Hosts and contributors ==
Andrew Johnstone is the creator and weekly host of the show. In 2011 the cast expanded to include former host of the podcast Sciencetastic, Joe Vilwock, and current creator of Movies On Up Dave Biscella. Since early 2013 the format of the show changed to include a rotating guest co-host every week that is usually the host of another podcast or contributor to podcasting in general.

== Premise ==
Each weekly episode would include between one and three reviews of other podcasts using a rating scale of Delete (bad) Hit or Miss (mediocre) and Subscribe (good). The second half of each episode would then feature a half-hour interview with the host of another podcast with questions that mostly focus on how they got started podcasting and more specific questions about their show and where it fits in with other podcasts.

The show shifted to a twice weekly format from late 2012 until June 2013. Episodes were released on Monday and Thursday. Monday's episodes would continue to feature the reviews of new podcasts and would also feature Johnstone and co-host Dave Biscella discussing the most recent events in podcast news. Thursday's episode would continue to feature interviews with podcasters, podcast business professionals, producers, and journalists of podcasting but the format expanded beyond half-hour episodes into 45-minute and hour long discussions.

Returning to once weekly episodes, the show alternates weeks between discussing the news with a rotating guest co-host and interviewing notable members of the podcast community.

== Lightning Round ==
This is a regular feature on the show where Johnstone asks three off the wall questions of his guests in order to extract a humorous or potentially revealing answer. Common themes in these questions include acts of cannibalism, super powers, and the official mascot of Podcast Squared, a hippo, entering into gladiatorial combat with a random opponent with the victor chosen by the guest.

== Ending ==
The show ended in 2014. In later podcast appearances Johnstone has stated that it was too much work at the time but that the show may see a revival in 2021.
