= The Partly Cloudy Patriot =

2002 book by Sarah Vowell

- Author: Sarah Vowell
- Language: English
- Genre: Essay collection
- Publication date: 2002
- Publication place: United States

The Partly Cloudy Patriot is a book published in 2002, by Sarah Vowell, a contributing editor for the WBEZ / Public Radio International program This American Life. This book is a collection of essays about American history and the author's own reflections on several matters.

The chapters include scenes from Vowell's vacations in history tourism, an open letter to Bill Clinton about his presidential library, and stories about her own past. Also in these readings is a script about her story and love for a young man thousands of miles away named Ray.

== Audiobook ==
The audiobook features music by They Might Be Giants and a cast including:

- Conan O'Brien as Abraham Lincoln
- Seth Green as Congressman Mike Synar
- Stephen Colbert as Al Gore
- David Cross as Theodore Roosevelt
- Paul Begala as George W. Bush
- Michael Chabon as Walt Whitman
- Norman Lear as "Kevin"
