= The Wordy Shipmates =

2008 book by Sarah Vowell

- First edition front cover
- Author: Sarah Vowell
- Language: English
- Subject: History
- Genre: Non-fiction
- Publisher: Riverhead
- Publication date: October 2008
- Publication place: United States
- Media type: Print (hardcover)
- Pages: 272 pp
- ISBN: 978-1-59448-999-0
- OCLC: 213308994

The Wordy Shipmates is the fifth book by the American social commentator Sarah Vowell, published in October 2008. The book chronicles the 17th and 18th-century history of Puritan colonists in Massachusetts, United States. The book delineates a dichotomy between the Puritans of the Massachusetts Bay Colony and those who settled in Plymouth, Massachusetts, by analysing several key historical events, like the Pequot War and the banishment of Roger Williams and Anne Hutchinson.
