= Sarah Vowell =

American author, journalist and voice actress (born 1969)

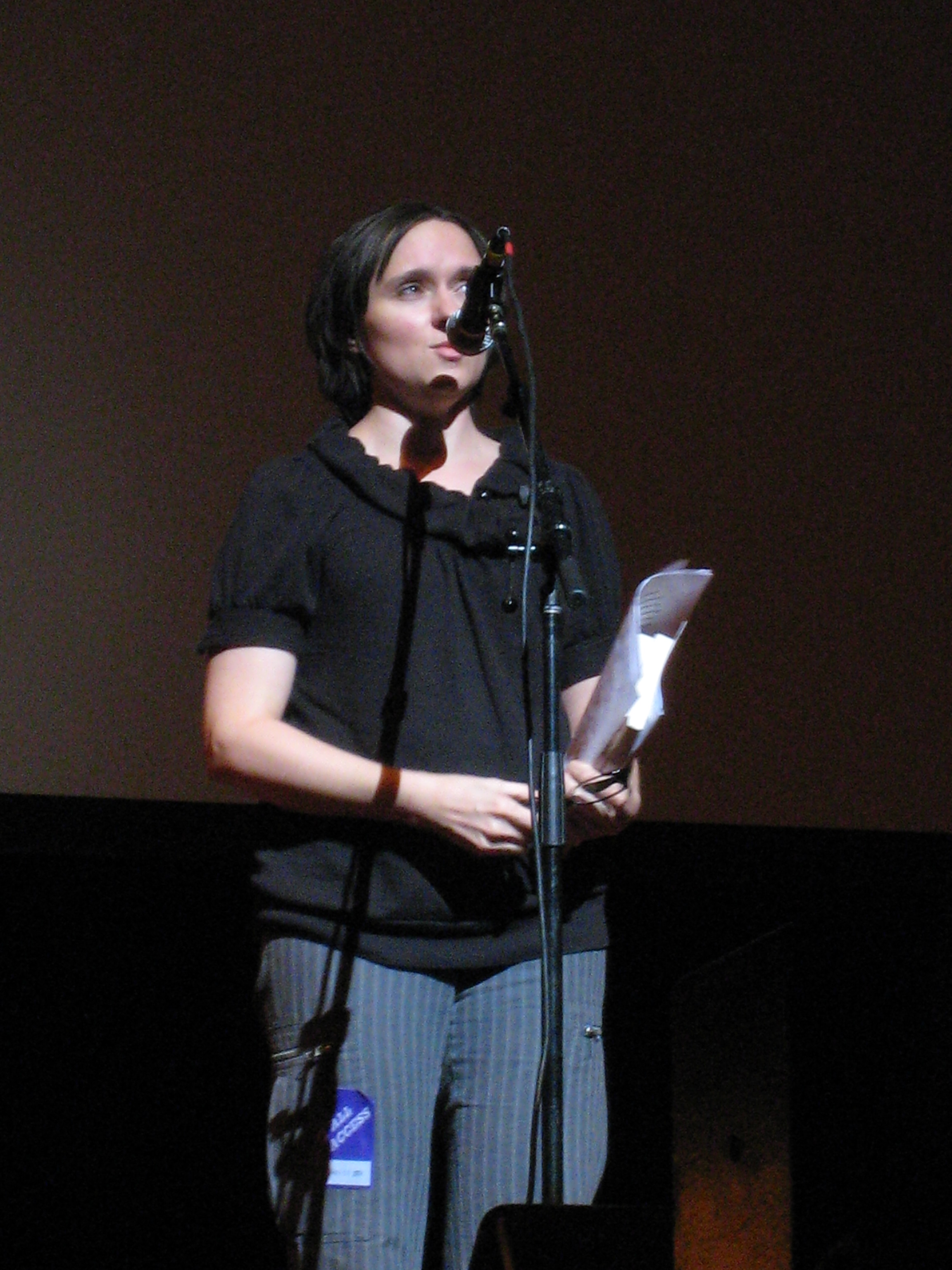
- Vowell in August 2007
- Born: Sarah Jane Vowell; December 27, 1969 (age 56); Muskogee, Oklahoma, U.S.
- Citizenship: American; Cherokee Nation
- Education: Montana State University (BA); School of the Art Institute of Chicago (MA)
- Occupations: Historian; Writer; journalist; social commentator; actress
- Years active: 1987–present

Sarah Jane Vowell (born December 27, 1969) is an American historian, writer, journalist, radio personality, social commentator, and actress. She has written seven nonfiction books on American history and culture. Vowell was a contributing editor for the radio program This American Life on Public Radio International from 1996 to 2008, where she produced commentaries and documentaries. She was the voice of Violet Parr in the 2004 animated film The Incredibles and its 2018 sequel.

== Early life and education ==
Sarah Vowell was born in Muskogee, Oklahoma, on December 27, 1969. She has Swedish, Scottish and Cherokee ancestry. She states that she is an enrolled citizen of the Cherokee Nation. Her family moved to Bozeman, Montana when she was eleven. She has a fraternal twin sister, Amy. Vowell graduated from Bozeman High School. She earned a BA from Montana State University in 1993 in Modern Languages and Literature, and an MA in Art History from the School of the Art Institute of Chicago in 1999.

== Career ==
=== Writing ===
Vowell's articles have been published in The Village Voice, Esquire, Spin Magazine, The New York Times, The Los Angeles Times, SF Weekly, and The Washington Post. She has been a regular contributor to the online magazine Salon, and was one of the original contributors to McSweeney's, participating in many of the literary journal Timothy McSweeney's Quarterly Concern's readings and shows.

Vowell's first book, Radio On: A Listener's Diary (1997), which featured her year-long diary of listening to the radio in 1995, caught the attention of This American Life host Ira Glass, and it led to Vowell becoming a frequent contributor to the show. Thereafter, segments on the show became the subjects for many of her subsequent published essays. Vowell's first essay collection was Take the Cannoli (2000), which was followed by The Partly Cloudy Patriot (2002).

In 2005, Vowell served as a guest columnist for The New York Times during several weeks in July, briefly filling in for Maureen Dowd. She again served as a guest columnist in February 2006. Her book Assassination Vacation (2005) describes a road trip to tourist sites devoted to the murders of presidents Abraham Lincoln, James A. Garfield and William McKinley. Vowell's book, The Wordy Shipmates (2008), analyzes the settlement of the New England Puritans in America and their contributions to American history. Also in 2008, Vowell's essay about Montana appeared in the book State by State: A Panoramic Portrait of America.

Vowell wrote Unfamiliar Fishes (2011), which discusses the Overthrow of the Kingdom of Hawaii and the Newlands Resolution. In April 2011, the book became a New York Times Bestseller. In her Los Angeles Times review, Susan Salter Reynolds wrote that Vowell's "cleverness is gorgeously American: She collects facts and stores them like a nervous chipmunk, digesting them only for the sake of argument." Allegra Goodman, writing in The Washington Post, describes the work as "a big gulp of a book, printed as an extended essay... Lacking section or chapter breaks, Vowell's quirky history lurches from one anecdote to the next. These are often entertaining, but in the aggregate they begin to sound the same...", adding that "Vowell tells a good tale" with "shrewd observations", but that "the narrative wears thin where casual turns cute and cute threatens to turn glib."

Her most recent book is Lafayette in the Somewhat United States (2015), an account of the Marquis de Lafayette, a French aristocrat who became George Washington's trusted officer and friend, and afterward an American celebrity. In a review for The New York Times, Charles P. Pierce wrote, "Vowell wanders through the history of the American Revolution and its immediate aftermath, using Lafayette's involvement in the war as a map, and bringing us all along in her perambulations… and doing it with a wink." NPR reviewer Colin Dwyer wrote, "It's awfully refreshing to see Vowell bring our founders down from their lofty pedestals. In her telling, they're just men again, not the gods we've long since made of them."

=== Public appearances, lectures, and oral histories ===
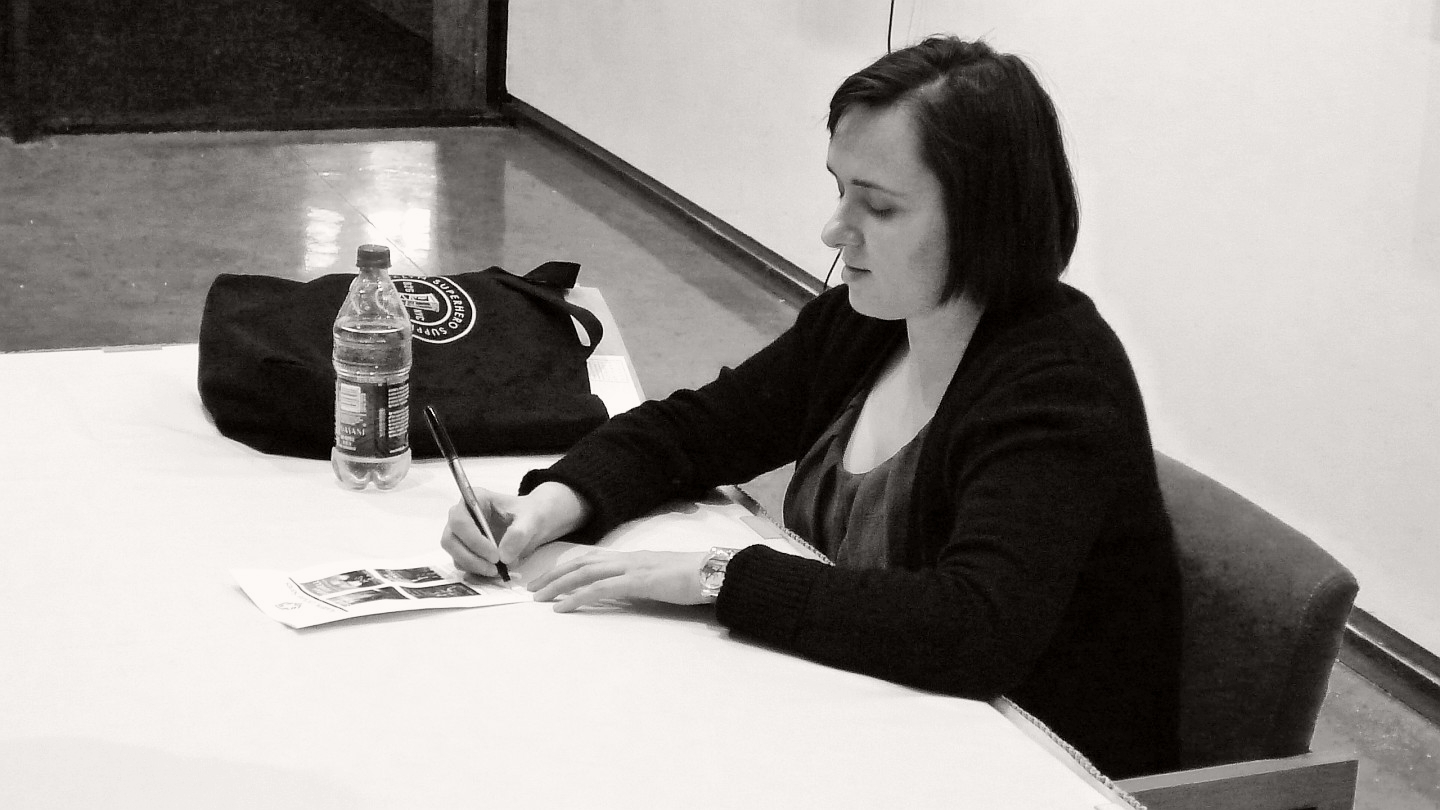
Vowell signing books after a lecture at Lamar University, Beaumont, Texas, 2010

Vowell has appeared on television shows including Nightline, The Daily Show with Jon Stewart, The Colbert Report, Jimmy Kimmel Live!, Late Show with David Letterman, and Late Night with Conan O'Brien.

In April 2006, Vowell served as the keynote speaker at the 27th Annual Kentucky Women Writers Conference. In August and September 2006, she toured the United States as part of the Revenge of the Book Eaters national tour, which benefited the children's literacy centers 826NYC, 826CHI, 826 Valencia, 826LA, 826 Michigan, and 826 Seattle.

Vowell provided commentary in Robert Wuhl's 2005 Assume the Position with Mr. Wuhl HBO specials.

In 2021, Vowell participated as an interviewer in the 1972 Montana Constitutional Convention Delegates oral histories.

=== Voice and acting work ===
Vowell provided the voice of Violet Parr, a shy teenager, in the 2004 Pixar animated film The Incredibles, and returned to her role for the film's sequel, Incredibles 2, in 2018. She voiced the character in related video games, and for Disney on Ice presentations. Director Brad Bird heard Vowell on This American Life, "Guns", (in which she and her father fire a homemade cannon) and determined that Vowell's voice fit the character. Pixar made a test animation for Violet using audio from that sequence, which was included on the DVD of The Incredibles. Vowell wrote and was featured in a documentary included on the same DVD, entitled "Vowellett – An Essay by Sarah Vowell", in which she reflects on the difference between being an author of history books on assassinated presidents and voicing the superhero Violet, and on what the role meant to her nephew. She will reprise the role again in the third installment.

Vowell featured prominently in the 2002 documentary about the alternative rock band They Might Be Giants, entitled Gigantic: A Tale of Two Johns, and she appeared with band members John Linnell and John Flansburgh in the DVD commentary for the movie. She provided commentary for the April 2006 episode "Murder at the Fair: The Assassination of President McKinley", one of ten in the History Channel miniseries 10 Days That Unexpectedly Changed America.

In September 2006, Vowell appeared as a minor character in the ABC drama Six Degrees. She appeared in an episode of HBO's Bored to Death, as an interviewer in a bar, and in 2010, appeared briefly in the film Please Give, as a shopper. Vowell appeared on The Daily Show as a Senior Historical Context Correspondent.

== Personal life ==
Vowell writes that she has a small amount of Cherokee Nation ancestry (about 1/8 on her mother's side and 1/16 on her father's side). She retraced the path of the forced removal of the Cherokee from the southeastern United States to Oklahoma, known as the Trail of Tears, with her twin sister Amy. In 1998, This American Life chronicled her story, devoting the entire hour to her work. Vowell spent many vacations with her sister and nephew visiting historical sites. As a child she attended church three times a week and seldom travelled. Vowell does not drive and is an avid public transit user.

She has described herself as a "culturally Christian atheist".

Vowell lives in Manhattan, New York. She was president of the advisory board of 826NYC, a nonprofit tutoring and writing center for students aged 6–18 in Brooklyn.

== Selected published works ==
- 1997 – Radio On: A Listener's Diary, ISBN 0-312-18301-1.
- 2000 – Take the Cannoli: Stories From the New World, ISBN 0-7432-0540-5.
- 2002 – The Partly Cloudy Patriot, ISBN 0-7432-4380-3.
- 2005 – Assassination Vacation, ISBN 0-7432-6003-1.
- 2008 – The Wordy Shipmates, ISBN 1-59448-999-8.
- 2011 – Unfamiliar Fishes, ISBN 1-59448-787-1.
- 2015 – Lafayette in the Somewhat United States, ISBN 1-59463-174-3.

== Filmography ==
=== Film ===
Year	Title	Role	Notes
1987	End of the Line	Diner Waitress	Uncredited
1999	Man in the Sand	Herself	Documentary
2002	Gigantic	Herself	
2004	The Incredibles	Violet Parr	Voice
2010	Please Give	Shopper	
2011	Hit So Hard	Herself	Documentary
2013	A.C.O.D.	Lorraine	
2018	Incredibles 2	Violet Parr	Voice
2028	Incredibles 3	Violet Parr	Voice; In production

=== Television ===
Year	Title	Role	Notes
2006–2007	Six Degrees	Edie	2 episodes
2006	The Colbert Report	Herself	1 episode
2009	Bored to Death	Journalist	
2010	Lafayette: The Lost Hero	Herself	Documentary
2011	Jimmy Kimmel Live!	Herself	Special guest
2011, 2013, 2015	The Daily Show with Jon Stewart	Herself	Special guest
2011	Last Call with Carson Daly	Herself	Special guest
2011	The Tavis Smiley Show	Herself	Special guest
2015	Conan	Herself	Special guest
2016	Well Read V	Herself	Special guest
2018	The Who Was? Show	Herself	Episode: "George Washington & Marco Polo"
2022	Dicktown	Various voices	Episode: "The Mystery of Meg's Extremely Violent and Inappropriate Musical"
2024	LEGO Pixar: BrickToons	Violet Parr (voice)	Episode: "Pizza Night"

=== Video games ===
Year	Title	Role	Notes
2004	The Incredibles	Violet Parr	
2004	The Incredibles: When Danger Calls	Violet Parr	
2012	Kinect Rush: A Disney-Pixar Adventure	Violet Parr	
2013	Disney Infinity	Violet Parr	Credited as Sara Vowell
2014	Disney Infinity 2.0	Violet Parr	Credited as Sara Vowell
2015	Disney Infinity 3.0	Violet Parr	Credited as Sara Vowell
2018	Lego The Incredibles	Violet Parr	
2024	Disney Speedstorm	Violet Parr	

=== Short film ===
Year	Title	Role	Notes
2005	Vowellet – An Essay by Sarah Vowell	Herself, writer, archive footage	Included as a bonus feature to The Incredibles on home media; details Vowell's voice work during the film while also writing Assassination Vacation and how her This American Life writing/narration earned her the role of Violet.

=== Theme parks ===
Year	Title	Role	Notes
2018	Incredicoaster	Violet Parr	Voice
