= List of The Daily Show episodes (2016) =

- No. of episodes: 160

Release
- Original network: Comedy Central
- Original release: January 4 – December 15, 2016

Season chronology
- ← Previous; 2015 episodes Next → 2017 episodes

This is a list of episodes for The Daily Show with Trevor Noah in 2016.

== 2016 ==
=== January ===
No.	Original air date	Guest(s)	Promotion	US viewers (millions)
2717	January 4	David Cross	The Increasingly Poor Decisions of Todd Margaret	0.879
A new open-carry gun law goes into effect in Texas, Fox News spends New Year's Eve with the GOP presidential candidates, and David Cross discusses his show Todd Margaret
2718	January 5	Ryan Coogler	Creed	0.774
Jordan Klepper sends a care package to a militia group involved in an armed standoff at a federal building in Oregon, and director Ryan Coogler discusses his film Creed.
2719	January 6	David J. Peterson	Peterson, David J. (2015). The Art of Language Invention: From Horse-Lords to Dark Elves, the Words Behind World-Building. Penguin Publishing. ISBN 978-0-14-312646-1.	0.925
President Obama takes executive action on gun regulation, Hasan Minhaj examines the secondary sneaker market, and David J. Peterson discusses The Art of Language Invention.
2720	January 7	Dalia Mogahed	N/A	0.765
Donald Trump questions Ted Cruz's presidential eligibility, Jessica Williams breaks down a campaign ad on immigration, and Dalia Mogahed discusses Islamic stereotypes.
2721	January 11	Colin Quinn	Cop Show	0.681
Mexico captures drug kingpin Joaquín "El Chapo" Guzmán, Roy Wood, Jr. prepares for President Obama's final State of the Union address, and Colin Quinn chats about Cop Show.
2722	January 12	Greg Gutfeld	Gutfeld, Greg (2015). How To Be Right: The Art of Being Persuasively Correct. Crown Publishing. ISBN 978-1-101-90362-9.	0.728
Bernie Sanders closes in on Hillary Clinton in the polls, Al Madrigal examines an Apache tribe's fight for land in Arizona, and Greg Gutfeld discusses How to Be Right'.
2723	January 13	Rand Paul, Tavis Smiley	Smiley, Tavis (2016). The Covenant with Black America - Ten Years Later. Hay House. ISBN 978-1-4019-5149-8.	0.874
President Obama delivers his last State of the Union, Rand Paul appears in his own GOP debate, and Tavis Smiley discusses The Covenant with Black America - Ten Years Later.
2724	January 14	Ice Cube	Ride Along 2	0.699
The people of Flint, Michigan, face citywide water contamination, Roy Wood, Jr. weighs in on the Oscar nominations' lack of diversity, and Ice Cube chats about Ride Along 2.
2725	January 18	Moira Demos & Laura Ricciardi	Making a Murderer	0.77
The Republicans and Democrats have debates in South Carolina. Jessica Williams fact-checks both the debates. Moira Demos & Laura Ricciardi discuss Making a Murderer and future of the series.
2726	January 19	Jess Glynne	I Cry When I Laugh	0.819
Sarah Palin endorses Donald Trump for president. Roy Wood, Jr. examines if allowing betting on the presidential election can improve voter turnout in United States presidential elections. Jess Glynne presents songs from her debut album, I Cry When I Laugh.
2727	January 20	Gael García Bernal	Mozart in the Jungle	0.895
Sarah Palin has a memorable endorsement speech for Donald Trump. Hasan Minhaj proposes investing in guns, Lego and Lego guns. Gael Garćia Bernal talks about his award-winning show Mozart in the Jungle and upcoming film Desierto.
2728	January 21	Marlon Wayans	Fifty Shades of Black	0.767
Vladimir Putin is accused of approving an assassination, Jessica Williams examines a New York town's questionable seal, and Marlon Wayans discusses Fifty Shades of Black.
2729	January 25	Gad Elmaleh	N/A	0.764
Carly Fiorina turns a preschool trip into a pro-life rally, Ronny Chieng meets a gay couple living as a father and a son, and Gad Elmaleh chats about his first U.S. comedy tour.
2730	January 26	DeRay McKesson	N/A	0.761
ISIS suffers financial problems, Martin O'Malley and Hillary Clinton answer awkward questions at a CNN town hall, and DeRay Mckesson discusses the Black Lives Matter movement.
2731	January 27	Jerry Seinfeld	Comedians in Cars Getting Coffee	0.868
Donald Trump drops out of a GOP debate, two undercover anti-Planned Parenthood investigators are indicted, and Jerry Seinfeld chats about Comedians in Cars Getting Coffee.
2732	January 28	Ryan Lizza	N/A	0.835
Jordan Klepper and Hasan Minhaj weigh Ted Cruz against Donald Trump, Roy Wood, Jr. breaks down political ads, and Ryan Lizza discusses the GOP presidential contenders.

=== February ===
No.	Original air date	Guest(s)	Promotion	US viewers (millions)
2733	February 1	Reshma Saujani	Girls Who Code	0.754
The Zika virus outbreak garners different reactions from North and South America. As a part of Black History Month, Roy Wood Jr. looks back at Martin Luther King Jr.'s 1963 arrest in Alabama, Ronny Chieng wonders if Iowa caucuses matter, and Reshma Saujani discusses the importance of Girls Who Code.
2734	February 2	Peter Bergen	Bergen, Peter L. (2016). United States of Jihad: Investigating America's Homegrown Terrorists. Crown Publishers. ISBN 978-0-8041-3954-0.	0.739
Iowans vote in their caucuses. Jordan Klepper explains real winners of Iowa caucuses. As a part of Black History Month, The Best F#@king News Team Ever looks back at Emancipation Proclamation in Kentucky. Peter Bergen talks about Jihadist extremism in the United States.
2735	February 3	Hannibal Buress	Hannibal Buress: Comedy Camisado	1.015
Trevor discusses accuracy of political pundits in predicting results of Iowa caucuses. As a part of Black History Month, Roy Wood Jr. examines racism in porn industry with Lisa Ann. Hannibal Buress talks about his upcoming Netflix comedy show Hannibal Buress: Comedy Camisado.
2736	February 4	Lilly Singh	A Trip to Unicorn Island	0.768
The Republican field narrows. Rick Santorum endorses Marco Rubio, Ronny Chieng examines a questionable NBA promotion, and Lilly Singh discusses A Trip to Unicorn Island.
2737	February 8	Gillian Jacobs	Love	0.882
Donald Trump lashes out at the audience during a GOP debate, Jessica Williams breaks down Beyoncé's Super Bowl halftime show, and Gillian Jacobs discusses her Netflix series Love.
2738	February 9	The Suffers	The Suffers	0.773
Donald Trump lashes out at Ted Cruz, Jessica Williams examines the Democrats' gender divide, and The Suffers perform songs from their self-titled debut album.
2739	February 10	Olivia Wilde	Vinyl	1.035
Bernie Sanders and Donald Trump win the New Hampshire primaries, Roy Wood Jr. hits the campaign trail, and Olivia Wilde discusses her role in the HBO series Vinyl.
2740	February 11	Ben Stiller	Zoolander No. 2	0.735
Jordan Klepper attends Donald Trump's political circus, Roy Wood Jr. investigates the decline of American fast food, and Ben Stiller chats about Zoolander 2.
2741	February 22	Cory Booker	Booker, Cory (2016). United: Thoughts on Finding Common Ground and Advancing the Common Good. Ballantine Books. ISBN 978-1-101-96516-0.	0.905
Jeb Bush drops out of the GOP presidential race, Yoweri Museveni is reelected president of Uganda for a fifth term, and Senator Cory Booker discusses his book United.
2742	February 23	Anthony Mackie	Triple 9	0.777
Senate Republicans preemptively veto President Obama's Supreme Court nomination, Jessica Williams investigates a homophobic church, and Anthony Mackie discusses Triple 9.
2743	February 24	Brian Chesky	Airbnb	0.909
Donald Trump wins his third straight Republican primary, researchers discover that Adolf Hitler had a micropenis, and Airbnb CEO Brian Chesky discusses founding his company.
2744	February 25	Michael Hayden	Hayden, Michael Vincent (2016). Playing to the Edge: American Intelligence in the Age of Terror. Penguin Press. ISBN 978-1-59420-656-6.	0.717
Apple refuses to unlock a terrorist's iPhone for the FBI, Hillary Clinton and Bernie Sanders vie for the black vote, and Michael Hayden discusses Playing to the Edge.
2745	February 29	Morris Chestnut	Rosewood	0.884
Bernie Sanders takes his loss in the South Carolina primary in stride, Donald Trump unknowingly tweets a Benito Mussolini quote, and Morris Chestnut chats about Rosewood.

=== March ===
No.	Original air date	Guest(s)	Promotion	US viewers (millions)
2746	March 1	Neal Brennan	3 Mics	0.780
Iowa lawmakers propose a bill that could allow kids under 14 to shoot handguns, Kristen Schaal examines female body acceptance, and Neal Brennan discusses 3 Mics.
2747	March 2	Chrissy Teigen	Teigen, Chrissy; Sussman, Adeena (2016). Cravings: Recipes for All the Food You Want to Eat. Clarkson Potter/Ten Speed. ISBN 978-1-101-90391-9.	0.867
The Best F#@king News Team reveals Trevor's feelings about Donald Trump, Hasan Minhaj weighs in on Marco Rubio's primary strategy, and Chrissy Teigen chats about Cravings.
2748	March 3	Bill de Blasio	N/A	0.756
Mitt Romney disavows Donald Trump, Jordan Klepper learns about an unexpected compromise on gun research, and Mayor Bill de Blasio discusses New York City's tech industry.
2749	March 7	Ilana Glazer & Abbi Jacobson	Broad City	0.953
The GOP fights Donald Trump for party control, Roy Wood Jr. and Jessica Williams honor Ben Carson's political career, and Ilana Glazer and Abbi Jacobson discuss Broad City.
2750	March 8	Elliot Page	Gaycation	0.824
Jordan Klepper talks to white kids who have only ever known a black president, Lewis Black reviews Osama bin Laden's will, and Elliot Page discusses his series Gaycation.
2751	March 9	Sacha Baron Cohen	Grimsby	0.768
Bernie Sanders pulls a surprise win in the Michigan primary, Jordan Klepper fact-checks Donald Trump's business record, and Sacha Baron Cohen discusses The Brothers Grimsby.
2752	March 10	Padma Lakshmi	Lakshmi, Padma (8 March 2016). Love, Loss, and What We Ate: A Memoir. HarperCollins. ISBN 978-0-06-220261-1.	0.758
Canadian Prime Minister Justin Trudeau visits the U.S., Ronny Chieng examines the Tri-Faith Initiative in Nebraska, and Padma Lakshmi discusses Love, Loss, and What We Ate.
2753	March 14	Van Jones	The Dream Corps	0.954
Bernie Sanders supporters crash a series of Donald Trump rallies, Neal Brennan weighs in on Kim Kardashian and Kanye West, and CNN's Van Jones discusses the Dream Corps.
2754	March 15	Joe Nocera	Nocera, Joseph; Strauss, Ben (2016). Indentured: The Inside Story of the Rebellion Against the NCAA. Portfolio/Penguin. ISBN 978-1-59184-632-1.	0.820
Hillary Clinton accidentally revives a Benghazi conversation, The Best F#@king News Team provides a service for Donald Trump supporters, and Joe Nocera discusses Indentured.
2755	March 16	Brian Fallon	Painkillers	0.819
Donald Trump predicts rioting if he doesn't win the Republican nomination, Adam Lowitt examines anti-Semitism in politics, and Brian Fallon performs songs from his album Painkillers.
2756	March 17	Theo James	Allegiant	0.748
President Obama nominates Merrick Garland for the Supreme Court, Hasan Minhaj and Roy Wood Jr. debate Third Month Mania matchups, and Theo James discusses Allegiant.
2757	March 21	Shaka Senghor	Senghor, Shaka (2016). Writing My Wrongs: Life, Death, and Redemption in an American Prison. Convergent Books. ISBN 978-1-101-90729-0.	0.855
Trevor examines the media's relationship with Donald Trump, Ronny Chieng investigates artificial intelligence, and Shaka Senghor discusses his memoir Writing My Wrongs.
2758	March 22	Taavi Rõivas	N/A	0.727
President Obama visits Cuba, Roy Wood Jr. finds out how Thabo Sefolosha beat a wrongful arrest, and Prime Minister Taavi Roivas discusses Estonia's technological advances.
2759	March 23	Lindsey Graham	N/A	0.886
Trevor examines how the GOP ended up with Donald Trump, and Senator Lindsey Graham shoots pool and explains why he begrudgingly endorsed presidential hopeful Ted Cruz.
2760	March 24	Ethan Hawke	Born to Be Blue	0.741
Ted Cruz blasts President Obama's response to bombings in Brussels, Donald Trump Speaks to the Washington Post: A Dramatic Reenactment, Roy Wood Jr. and Hasan Minhaj weigh Third Month Mania rivals, and Ethan Hawke discusses Born to Be Blue.

=== April ===
No.	Original air date	Guest(s)	Promotion	US viewers (millions)
2761	April 4	Debbie Wasserman Schultz	N/A	0.735
Hillary Clinton shuts down Bernie Sanders's debate request, Debbie Wasserman Schultz weighs in on the presidential election, and a Panama law firm reveals global corruption.
2762	April 5	Jerrod Carmichael	The Carmichael Show	0.735
The U.S. women's soccer team calls for pay equal to their male counterparts, Trevor examines Donald Trump's sexist past, and Jerrod Carmichael discusses The Carmichael Show.
2763	April 6	Angelica Ross	TransTech Social Enterprises	0.782
North Carolina and Kansas pass transphobic bathroom laws, Jessica Williams examines trans panic, and Angelica Ross discusses TransTech Social Enterprises.
2764	April 7	Juan Williams	Williams, Juan (5 April 2016). We the People: The Modern-Day Figures Who Have Reshaped and Affirmed the Founding Fathers' Vision of America. Crown. ISBN 978-0-307-95206-6.	0.798
Michelle Wolf unpacks the role of candidates' wives on the campaign trail, the winner of Third Month Mania is revealed, and Juan Williams discusses his book We the People.
2765	April 11	Jennifer Hudson	Confirmation	0.877
Hillary Clinton and John Kasich make campaign missteps in New York City, Jordan Klepper tests a Japanese virtual reality sex suit, and Jennifer Hudson discusses Confirmation.
2766	April 12	King Bach	Meet the Blacks	0.890
Bill de Blasio makes a joke about "colored people time"; Ronny Chieng and Jessica Williams examine sexual racism; and Vine star King Bach discusses Meet the Blacks.
2767	April 13	Ken Jeong	Dr. Ken	0.737
Former House Speaker Dennis Hastert is indicted on banking charges, Trevor examines Donald Trump's failed line of health products, and Ken Jeong discusses Dr. Ken.
2768	April 14	W. Kamau Bell	United Shades of America	0.828
Jordan Klepper demonstrates the problem with primary delegates, Ted Cruz tries to appear likable at a CNN town hall, and W. Kamau Bell discusses United Shades of America.
2769	April 18	Ellie Kemper	Unbreakable Kimmy Schmidt	0.789
A Muslim man is kicked off a Southwest flight for speaking Arabic, Desi Lydic teaches Ted Cruz about "New York values," and Ellie Kemper discusses Unbreakable Kimmy Schmidt.
2770	April 19	Ben Carson	N/A	0.809
Brazil's Congress votes to impeach President Dilma Rousseff, and Ben Carson defends his endorsement of Donald Trump and faces off against an unlikely opponent in a debate.
2771	April 20	Sturgill Simpson	A Sailor's Guide to Earth	0.847
Hillary Clinton and Donald Trump win their New York primaries, The Best F#@king News Team relives the 90s, and Sturgill Simpson performs songs from A Sailor's Guide to Earth.
2772	April 21	Howard Dean	N/A	0.737
Desi Lydic scams her fellow New Yorkers, Hasan Minhaj provides a few tax evasion tips, and Howard Dean offers his take on the Bernie Sanders campaign.
2773	April 25	Danielle Brooks	The Color Purple	0.785
Beyoncé's album Lemonade creates a media frenzy, Hasan Minhaj talks to Sikh victims of Islamophobia, and Danielle Brooks discusses her Broadway turn in The Color Purple.
2774	April 26	Keegan-Michael Key & Jordan Peele	Keanu	0.726
Virginia grants voting rights to its previously incarcerated citizens, New York repeals its sales tax on tampons, and Jordan Peele and Keegan-Michael Key chat about Keanu.
2775	April 27	McKay Coppins	Coppins, Mckay (December 2015). The Wilderness: Deep Inside the Republican Party's Combative, Contentious, Chaotic Quest to Take Back the White House. Little, Brown. ISBN 978-0-316-32741-1.	0.847
Donald Trump aims sexist remarks at Hillary Clinton, Lewis Black auditions for a morning TV show, and BuzzFeed's McKay Coppins discusses his book The Wilderness.
2776	April 28	Ricky Gervais	Special Correspondents	0.836
John Boehner rips into fellow Republican Ted Cruz, Black Trump (Roy Wood, Jr.) debuts his rap video, and Ricky Gervais chats about his movie "Special Correspondents".

=== May ===
No.	Original air date	Guest(s)	Promotion	US viewers (millions)
2777	May 2	Nikolaj Coster-Waldau	Game of Thrones	0.852
Donald Trump surrounds himself with unusual supporters, Ronny Chieng investigates contested conventions, and Trevor chats with "Game of Thrones" star Nikolaj Coster-Waldau.
2778	May 3	Josh King	King, Josh (26 April 2016). Off Script: An Advance Man's Guide to White House Stagecraft, Campaign Spectacle, and Political Suicide. Macmillan. ISBN 978-1-137-28006-0.	0.891
Starbucks faces a lawsuit over its excessive use of ice, Donald Trump links Ted Cruz's father to Lee Harvey Oswald, and Josh King discusses his book "Off Script".
2779	May 4	Bethany Cosentino	N/A	0.929
Donald Trump becomes the presumptive GOP nominee, Hasan Minhaj investigates professional soccer's gender wage gap, and Bethany Cosentino fights sexism in the music industry.
2780	May 5	The Heavy	Hurt & the Merciless	0.691
Donald Trump panders to Hispanic voters, Ronny Chieng reports on America's rising selfie obsession, and The Heavy performs songs from their album "Hurt & the Merciless".
2781	May 9	Sherman Alexie	Alexie, Sherman (10 May 2016). Thunder Boy Jr. Little, Brown Books for Young Readers. ISBN 978-0-316-01372-7.	0.759
The GOP comes to terms with Donald Trump's imminent presidential nomination, Desi Lydic weighs in on modern motherhood, and Sherman Alexie discusses his book "Thunder Boy Jr."
2782	May 10	Joe Morton	Turn Me Loose	0.755
The federal government files a lawsuit against North Carolina's transphobic bill, Michelle Wolf imagines a Donald Trump presidency, and Joe Morton discusses "Turn Me Loose."
2783	May 11	Nate Silver	N/A	0.806
Queen Elizabeth II calls out Chinese officials for being rude, Bernie Sanders wins the West Virginia Democratic primary, and Nate Silver discusses the presidential election.
2784	May 12	B. J. Novak	The List App	0.814
Donald Trump refuses to release his tax returns (#WeakDonald), Latino immigrants fast-track their paths to citizenship ahead of the election, and B.J. Novak discusses The List App.
2785	May 16	Anthony Anderson	Black-ish	0.793
Donald Trump is caught posing as his own fake publicist, Eliza Cossio examines the GOP's chance of winning the Latino vote, and Anthony Anderson discusses "Black-ish".
2786	May 17	Dahlia Lithwick	N/A	0.752
The Supreme Court refuses to rule on a pivotal contraception case, Hasan Minhaj reports on Canadians taking in Syrian refugees, and Dahlia Lithwick discusses SCOTUS's future.
2787	May 18	Jason Sudeikis	The Angry Birds Movie	0.760
Donald Trump and Megyn Kelly bury the hatchet, Hasan Minhaj sits down with Canadian Prime Minister Justin Trudeau, and Jason Sudeikis chats about "The Angry Birds Movie".
2788	May 19	Arianna Huffington	Huffington, Arianna Stassinopoulos (2016). The Sleep Revolution: Transforming Your Life, One Night at a Time. Harmony/Rodale. ISBN 978-1-101-90400-8.	0.779
President Obama calls for trans-friendly bathrooms in schools, Bernie Sanders fans contend with the Democratic Party, and Arianna Huffington discusses "The Sleep Revolution".
2789	May 23	Rose Byrne	X-Men: Apocalypse	0.765
Donald Trump helps Chris Christie pay off the debt from his failed presidential run, the TSA tries to recruit new employees, and Rose Byrne discusses "X-Men: Apocalypse".
2790	May 24	Katie Couric	Under the Gun	0.708
The NRA endorses presidential hopeful Donald Trump, Desi Lydic speaks to gun owners about firearm safety, and Katie Couric discusses her documentary "Under the Gun".
2791	May 25	Corey Pegues	Pegues, Corey (24 May 2016). Once a Cop: The Street, the Law, Two Worlds, One Man. Simon and Schuster. ISBN 978-1-5011-1049-8.	0.826
Brazil faces political turmoil as it prepares for the Olympics, Donald Trump ties Hillary Clinton to a discredited conspiracy theory, and Corey Pegues discusses "Once a Cop".
2792	May 26	Mike Allen	N/A	0.632
President Obama visits Vietnam. First time Donald Trump beats Hillary Clinton in national polls: discussion with Michelle Wolf. Trump's trouble with women voters. Politico's Chief White House Correspondent, Mike Allen, discusses the presidential race.

=== June ===
No.	Original air date	Guest(s)	Promotion	US viewers (millions)
2793	June 13	James Carville	Politicon	0.730
Trevor discusses the mass shooting in Orlando, FL, Jordan Klepper learns about a GOP delegation dispute in the U.S. Virgin Islands, and James Carville discusses Politicon.
2794	June 14	Michelangelo Signorile, Eddie Huang	It's Not Over: Getting Beyond Tolerance, Defeating Homophobia, and Winning True Equality. ISBN 978-1-4945-6313-4., Huang, Eddie (2016). Double Cup Love: On the Trail of Family, Food, and Broken Hearts in China. Spiegel & Grau. ISBN 978-0-8129-9546-6.	0.735
Michaelangelo Signorile, Editor-at-Large for The Huffington Post, discusses the impact of the Orlando shooting on the gay community. Chef Eddie Huang discusses growing up in Orlando and gun culture.
2795	June 15	Roland Emmerich	Independence Day: Resurgence	0.773
Jordan Klepper and Desi Lydic discuss white voters, Roy Wood Jr. examines Alabama's scandal-plagued government, and Roland Emmerich talks about "Independence Day: Resurgence".
2796	June 16	Deshauna Barber	N/A	0.677
Senate Democrats push for gun control in a 15-hour filibuster, Trevor examines Australia's declining species, and Miss USA Deshauna Barber discusses PTSD aid for veterans.
2797	June 20	Jim Himes, Jack Garratt	Phase	0.787
Congressman Jim Himes (D-Conn) explains the gun control debate in the House. British singer/songwriter Jack Garratt performs "Worry" and "Weathered" from his album Phase.
2798	June 21	Tavis Smiley	Smiley, Tavis; Ritz, David (21 June 2016). Before You Judge Me: The Triumph and Tragedy of Michael Jackson's Last Days. Little, Brown. ISBN 978-0-316-25909-5.	0.775
Roy Wood Jr. and Jordan Klepper demonstrate why Congress can't pass gun control legislation, a heat wave hits the Southwest, and Tavis Smiley discusses "Before You Judge Me".
2799	June 22	John Heilemann & Mark Halperin	The Circus: Inside the Greatest Political Show on Earth	0.763
Rio de Janeiro prepares for the Olympics, Roy Wood Jr. investigates lobbyists and the Army Corps of Engineers, and John Heilemann and Mark Halperin discuss "The Circus".
2800	June 23	Macklemore	This Unruly Mess I've Made	0.760
House Democrats stage a sit-in protest to call for gun control legislation, Michelle Wolf dissects the Second Amendment, and Macklemore discusses opioid addiction.
2801	June 27	Cynthia Erivo	The Color Purple	0.830
The U.K. votes to leave the European Union, Roy Wood Jr. breaks down Jesse Williams's anti-racism speech at the BET Awards, and Cynthia Erivo discusses "The Color Purple".
2802	June 28	Calvin Trillin	Trillin, Calvin (2016). Jackson, 1964: And Other Dispatches from Fifty Years of Reporting on Race in America. Random House. ISBN 978-0-399-58824-2.	0.760
The Supreme Court strikes down restrictive abortion regulations in Texas, Jordan Klepper reports on Illinois's budget impasse, and Calvin Trillin discusses "Jackson, 1964".
2803	June 29	Laverne Cox	Orange Is the New Black	0.847
Elizabeth Warren campaigns with presidential hopeful Hillary Clinton, Desi Lydic fact-checks a Donald Trump speech, and Laverne Cox chats about "Orange Is the New Black".
2804	June 30	Chuck Klosterman	Klosterman, Chuck (2016). But What If We're Wrong: Thinking About the Present As If It Were the Past. Penguin. ISBN 978-0-399-18412-3.	0.880
The U.K. hunts for a new prime minister following the Brexit vote, Jessica Williams says goodbye to The Daily Show, and Chuck Klosterman discusses "But What If We're Wrong?"

=== July ===
No.	Original air date	Guest(s)	Promotion or Feature	US viewers (millions)
2805	July 5	Jim Gaffigan	The Jim Gaffigan Show	0.799
The FBI announces that Hillary Clinton won't be indicted over an email scandal, Donald Trump tweets an anti-Semitic image, and Jim Gaffigan discusses The Jim Gaffigan Show.
2806	July 6	Terry McMillan	McMillan, Terry (2016). I Almost Forgot About You. Crown. ISBN 978-1-101-90257-8.	0.819
Hillary Clinton's past remarks about her email investigation prove to be untrue, Donald Trump praises Saddam Hussein for killing Iraqi citizens with poison gas, and Terry McMillan discusses "I Almost Forgot About You".
2807	July 7	Julia Stiles	Jason Bourne	0.804
Trevor reacts to the police shootings of two black men, Gretchen Carlson sues Fox News CEO Roger Ailes for sexual harassment, and Julia Stiles discusses "Jason Bourne".
Special	July 18	N/A	2016 Republican Party Nomination Campaign clip show	1.070
"Democalypse 2016: The Road to 'The Road'"; Trevor takes a look back at the bizarre and unprecedented primary season that led to Donald Trump's emergence as the GOP nominee.
2808	July 19	Michael Steele	N/A	1.049
"Submission Accomplished - Night One - An Unbelievably Classy And Tremendous And Huge And Good Convention"; To kick off The Daily Show's Republican National Convention coverage, Trevor breaks down the first day of speeches, and Michael Steele discusses Donald Trump's GOP nomination.
2809	July 20	Christiane Amanpour	N/A	0.880
"Submission Accomplished - Night Two - Last Chance To Say Something, Paul Ryan"; From the RNC in Cleveland, Chris Christie leads anti-Hillary Clinton chants, Jordan Klepper examines Donald Trump's faith, and Christiane Amanpour discusses political unity.
2810	July 21	Alex Wagner	Feature: The Very Very Incredible Deal	0.517
"Submission Accomplished - Night Three - Holy Balls, It's Really Happening"; Live from the RNC in Cleveland, Donald Trump accepts the presidential nomination, Rosie O'Donnell looks back at the mogul's life, and Alex Wagner discusses the election.
2811	July 22	N/A	N/A	0.696
"Submission Accomplished - Night Four - The Party's Over"; On The Daily Show's final night of RNC coverage, The Best F#@king News Team reacts to Donald Trump's nomination, fact-checks the speeches and prepares for possible deportation.
Special	July 25	N/A	2016 Democratic Party Nomination Campaign clip show	0.638
"Democalypse 2016: What To Expect When You're Expectant"; To kick off the Democratic National Convention, Trevor revisits a primary process that pitted Hillary Clinton against Bernie Sanders.
2812	July 26	John Podesta	N/A	0.777
"Let's Not Get Crazy - Night One - A Bold New Same"; Kicking off The Daily Show's Democratic National Convention coverage, The Best F#@king News Team examines a DNC email leak, and John Podesta discusses Hillary Clinton's run.
2813	July 27	Kirsten Gillibrand	N/A	0.669
"Let's Not Get Crazy - Night Two - Every Minority The Cameras Could Find"; From the DNC in Philadelphia, Desi Lydic unpacks Hillary Clinton's nomination, Donald Trump asks Russia to hack the U.S., and Senator Kirsten Gillibrand discusses paid leave.
2814	July 28	Mark Leibovich	N/A	0.523
"Let's Not Get Crazy - Night Three - Goldman Sachs Presents The Hillary Acceptance Speech"; As the DNC wraps up in Philadelphia, Hillary Clinton accepts the Democratic nomination for president, and Mark Leibovich discusses the high-stakes election.
2815	July 29	Cory Booker	N/A	0.581
"Let's Not Get Crazy - Night Four - Can We Please Just Vote Now?"; On The Daily Show's final night at the DNC in Philadelphia, The Best F#@king News Team reviews the week's speeches, and Cory Booker discusses Hillary Clinton's campaign.

=== August ===
No.	Original air date	Guest(s)	Promotion or Feature	US viewers (millions)
2816	August 8	John Lewis	March: Book Three	0.719
"2016 Daily Show Summer Games"; Donald Trump accuses Democrats of rigging the election, and Representative John Lewis talks about participating in the civil rights movement in his book "March: Book Three."
2817	August 9	Riki Lindhome & Natasha Leggero	Another Period	0.685
"2016 Daily Show Summer Games"; Congress battles over Zika funding amid U.S. outbreaks, Desi Lydic fact-checks Donald Trump's economic speech, and Riki Lindhome and Natasha Leggero discuss Another Period.
2818	August 10	Mychal Denzel Smith	Smith, Mychal Denzel (14 June 2016). Invisible man, got the whole world watching : a young black man's education. PublicAffairs. ISBN 978-1-56858-528-4.	0.738
"2016 Daily Show Summer Games"; Donald Trump calls on Second Amendment supporters to thwart Hillary Clinton, and Mychal Denzel Smith discusses "Invisible Man, Got the Whole World Watching."
2819	August 11	Mike Birbiglia	Don't Think Twice	0.679
"2016 Daily Show Summer Games"; Donald Trump claims Barack Obama founded ISIS, Trevor suggests ways to prevent police from shooting unarmed citizens, and Mike Birbiglia discusses "Don't Think Twice."
2820	August 15	Daniel Radcliffe	Imperium	0.776
"2016 Daily Show Summer Games"; Donald Trump's surrogates defend his claims that President Obama founded ISIS, Ronny Chieng examines the Trump Organization, and Daniel Radcliffe discusses "Imperium."
2821	August 16	Yaa Gyasi, Sharlto Copley	Homegoing, The Hollars	0.651
"2016 Daily Show Summer Games"; Desi Lydic fact-checks Donald Trump's counter-terrorism speech, Yaa Gyasi discusses her book "Homegoing," and Sharlto Copley talks about his movie "The Hollars."
2822	August 17	LeBron James	LeBron James Family Foundation and Cleveland Hustles	0.795
"2016 Daily Show Summer Games"; Donald Trump calls for more cops in black communities, Trevor examines police profiling, and LeBron James discusses the LeBron James Family Foundation and "Cleveland Hustles."
2823	August 18	Emily King	The Switch	0.660
"2016 Daily Show Summer Games"; The Best F#@king News Team examines third-party candidates, Jordan Klepper puts Donald Trump fans to the test, and Emily King performs songs from her album "The Switch."

=== September ===
No.	Original air date	Guest(s)	Promotion or Feature	US viewers (millions)
2824	September 6	Jeff Ross	Jeff Ross Roasts Cops	0.843
China snubs President Obama at the G20 Summit, Roy Wood Jr. weighs in on Donald Trump's attempt to woo black voters, and Jeff Ross discusses his special "Jeff Ross Roasts Cops".
2825	September 7	Ava DuVernay	Queen Sugar	0.797
Trevor breaks down Congress's inaction on Zika funding, Hasan Minhaj (Hasan Mi-jobs) details the latest features on the iPhone 7, and Ava DuVernay discusses "Queen Sugar".
2826	September 8	Howard Schultz	Upstanders	0.727
Matt Lauer grills Hillary Clinton on her emails, Desi Lydic fact-checks Donald Trump on international relations, and Starbucks CEO Howard Schultz discusses "Upstanders".
2827	September 12	Tip "T.I." Harris	T.I. & Tiny: The Family Hustle	0.697
Hillary Clinton comes under fire for hiding her pneumonia diagnosis, Hasan Minhaj investigates the Dakota Access pipeline, and Tip "T.I." Harris discusses "The Family Hustle".
2828	September 13	Danielle Weisberg & Carly Zakin	theSkimm	0.776
NFL star Colin Kaepernick protests during the national anthem, The Best F#@king News Team debates Kaepernick's patriotism, and Danielle Weisberg & Carly Zakin talk theSkimm.
2829	September 14	Hannah Hart	Dirty 30	0.890
A Missouri law may lift training requirements for gun owners, Roy Wood Jr. reports on a college protest that fights firearms with dildos, and Hannah Hart discusses Dirty 30.
2830	September 15	Bill Clinton	N/A	0.751
President Obama stumps for Hillary Clinton, Donald Trump stops by The Dr. Oz Show, and Clinton Foundation founder Bill Clinton discusses Hillary Clinton's campaign.
2831	September 19	Nick Jonas & Ben Schnetzer	Goat	0.702
New Yorkers are unfazed by a terrorist attack in Manhattan, Michelle Wolf tackles a burkini controversy in France, and Nick Jonas and Ben Schnetzer discuss their movie "Goat".
2832	September 20	Jada Pinkett Smith	Gotham	0.764
Donald Trump Jr. likens Syrian refugees to deadly Skittles, Jordan Klepper has an enlightening experience at a Trump rally and Jada Pinkett Smith discusses "Gotham".
2833	September 21	Wendy Williams	The Wendy Williams Show	0.790
Trevor examines the police shooting of Terence Crutcher, Wells Fargo scams millions of customers and Wendy Williams chats about hosting "The Wendy Williams Show".
2834	September 22	Lisa Ling	This Is Life with Lisa Ling	0.842
Mark Zuckerberg announces a plan to cure all diseases, Trevor marvels at Tomi Lahren's inexplicable anger, and CNN's Lisa Ling discusses "This Is Life with Lisa Ling".
2835	September 26	Alicia Menendez	N/A	0.817
"Debate Night 2016: 2 Podiums 2 Furious"; Live after the debate, Trevor covers the first debate between Hillary Clinton and Donald Trump, Jordan Klepper learns about political fact-checking, and Alicia Menendez discusses debate moderation.
2836	September 27	Sara Goldrick-Rab	Goldrick-Rab, Sara (13 September 2016). Paying The Price: College Costs, Financial Aid, and the Betrayal of the American Dream. University of Chicago Press. ISBN 978-0-226-40434-9.	0.823
Donald Trump blames his poor debate performance on his microphone, Desi Lydic fact-checks the first presidential debate, and Sara Goldrick-Rab discusses "Paying the Price".
2837	September 28	Reid Hoffman	Trumped Up Cards	0.943
Donald Trump defends attacks he made on a former Miss Universe's weight, Trevor looks back at Trump's history of sexism, and Reid Hoffman discusses the presidential election and "Trumped Up Cards".
2838	September 29	Blood Orange	Freetown Sound	0.692
Trevor examines the legacy of stop-and-frisk, Roy Wood Jr. and Jordan Klepper test North Carolina's anti-LGBT law, and Blood Orange performs songs from "Freetown Sound."

=== October ===
No.	Original air date	Guest(s)	Promotion or Feature	US viewers (millions)
2839	October 3	James Marsden	Westworld	0.782
Donald Trump may have avoided paying taxes for 18 years, Roy Wood Jr. weighs in on Congress allowing Saudi Arabia to be sued for 9/11, and James Marsden discusses "Westworld".
2840	October 4	Ezra Klein	N/A	0.934
"2016 Vice Presidential Debate: Two Men Enter, No One Cares"; Live after the debate, Trevor recaps the vice presidential debate between Mike Pence and Tim Kaine, Hasan Minhaj honors Joe Biden, and Ezra Klein discusses the 2016 election.
2841	October 5	Mark Duplass	Blue Jay	0.774
The media creates scandals by taking remarks by Hillary Clinton and Donald Trump out of context, Lewis Black urges millennials to vote, and Mark Duplass discusses "Blue Jay".
2842	October 6	Carmelo Anthony	Carmelo Anthony Foundation	0.703
Ronny Chieng unpacks a racist "O'Reilly Factor" segment, Desi Lydic finds out how sexism sells in the election, and Carmelo Anthony discusses the Carmelo Anthony Foundation.
2843	October 10	Xavier Becerra	N/A	0.899
Donald Trump brags about groping women in a 2005 video, Trevor likens Trump to an African dictator, and Xavier Becerra discusses Hillary Clinton's presidential campaign.
2844	October 11	Charlamagne Tha God	The Breakfast Club	0.981
Desi Lydic fact-checks 2016's second presidential debate, Michelle Wolf examines Donald Trump's sexual assault scandal, and Charlamagne Tha God discusses "The Breakfast Club."
2845	October 12	Bryan Christy	National Geographic Magazine, October 2016 issue	1.022
Conservative Christians defend Donald Trump's Pussygate comments, The Best F#@king News Team debates trigger warnings, and Bryan Christy discusses the rhino horn trade.
2846	October 13	Ana Navarro, Jidenna	The Chief	0.798
Multiple women accuse Donald Trump of sexual assault, Ana Navarro discusses growing tensions within the GOP, and Jidenna performs songs from his album "Long Live the Chief".
2847	October 17	Russell Simmons	Muslims Are Speaking Out Campaign	0.941
The U.S. bombs Yemen, Donald Trump claims that the 2016 presidential election will be rigged, and Russell Simmons discusses the Muslims Are Speaking Out campaign.
2848	October 18	Uzo Aduba	American Pastoral	0.986
Melania Trump addresses Donald Trump's Pussygate scandal, WikiLeaks publishes Hillary Clinton's emails and Wall Street speeches, and Uzo Aduba discusses "American Pastoral".
2849	October 19	Matt Taibbi	"The Fury and Failure of Donald Trump", Rolling Stone November 2016 issue	1.073
"Debate Night 2016: Let's Get Ready to Ramble"; In this live episode, after the third and final U.S. presidential debate, Trevor Noah unpacks Hillary Clinton and Donald Trump's final presidential debate, Roy Wood Jr. grills apathetic black voters, and Matt Taibbi talks Democalypse 2016 and the future of American politics.
2850	October 20	Mike Colter	Luke Cage	0.713
Donald Trump threatens to challenge the results of the 2016 election, Roy Wood Jr. examines the struggles black journalists face, and Mike Colter discusses "Luke Cage". Note: Trevor Noah is out sick due to upper respiratory & ear infection, and is replaced by Jordan Klepper.
Special	October 24	N/A	Democalypse 2016 Recap clip show	0.764
"Democalypse 2016 Roundup: The Best of the Worst"; Trevor Noah looks back on The Daily Show's coverage of the 2016 general election in all of its bizarre grandeur, from the Clinton-Trump debates, innumerable scandals (Trump Tapes & Jesse Watters' Chinatown Controversy) and Ken Bone's popularity.
2851	October 25	Dana Bash	N/A	0.807
Roy Wood Jr. examines the closing of a French refugee camp, Donald Trump pledges to sue his sexual assault accusers, and Dana Bash talks about reporting on the 2016 election.
2852	October 26	John Della Volpe & Phil Collins	Collins, Phil (20 October 2016). Not Dead Yet: The Autobiography. Century. ISBN 978-1-78089-512-3.	0.949
Trevor examines the online media's partisan divide, John Della Volpe talks about polling millennial voters, and Phil Collins chats about his memoir "Not Dead Yet".
2853	October 27	Jeezy	Trap or Die 3	0.845
The Obama administration announces major price hikes for Obamacare, Desi Lydic and Eliza Cossio conduct a rigged election poll, and rapper Jeezy discusses "Trap or Die 3".
2854	October 31	Jeff Ross	Indecision 2020	0.820
"October 31, 2020"; In this Halloween special, Trevor returns to the post-apocalyptic Daily Show studio in 2020, after four years of a Trump presidency. We get to see what happened to CNN, John Oliver and Chris Hardwick, after Trump's anti-media policies took place. The show also gives us a look into the Trump News Network (with Larry King), BBC News report of the wall, his anti-bullying policies, the new national anthem, and see how The Best F#@king News Team (Roy Wood Jr., Jordan Klepper, Ronny Chieng, Desi Lydic & Hasan Minhaj) is doing. In the third act, Trevor is visited by Jeff Ross, who is not doing well after working under Trump as 'Secretary of Offence'.

=== November ===
No.	Original air date	Guest(s)	Promotion or Feature	US viewers (millions)
2855	November 1	Susan Rice	N/A	0.720
The FBI begins another probe into Hillary Clinton's emails, Michelle Wolf discusses male birth control, and Susan Rice reflects on her time as National Security Advisor.
2856	November 2	Kal Penn	Designated Survivor	0.722
Trevor describes how Hillary Clinton is living the black experience, Desi Lydic meets Donald Trump's Trumpette supporters, and Kal Penn discusses "Designated Survivor".
2857	November 3	Common	Black America Again, 13th	0.864
Roy Wood Jr. was there to witness The Chicago Cub win, Trevor checks in on key Senate races in Illinois and North Carolina, Donald Trump's juvenile speechwriter is revealed, and Common discusses the racial injustices that inspired his album "Black America Again" and working with Ava DuVernay on the Netflix documentary "13th".
2858	November 7	Jonathan Capehart	Cape Up	0.875
The FBI concludes a probe into Hillary Clinton's emails just ahead of the 2016 election, Trevor urges viewers to vote, and Jonathan Capehart discusses his "Cape Up" podcast.
2859	November 8	Ana Marie Cox, Douglas Brinkley & Keegan-Michael Key	Election Night Democalypse 2016: The Series Finale of America	0.669 (Comedy Central) or 1.192 (All Broadcasts)
"Election Night 2016: No. No, Please. No. - Oh God, No!! - Noooooooo!!!!!!"; The Daily Show goes live on election night 2016 to give a final report on Democalypse 2016 by Trevor Noah & The Best F#@king News Team. The episode consists of live senate & presidential race updates, Trevor articulating concern for the close race, Ronny Chieng wondering why the results are taking so long, Jordan Klepper finding common ground between Clinton-Trump supporters, an interview with Ana Marie Cox, Douglas Brinkley & Keegan-Michael Key, and Desi Lydic asks Trump's poll-watchers what they plan to do on Election Day. Note: This episode was a 1-hour special (44 mins excluding commercials) that was broadcast on Comedy Central, MTV, MTV2, VH1, Spike, TV Land and The Comedy Network. The entire special was livestreamed on the Comedy Central website and app. The show's first act was also streamed on Facebook and Periscope.
2860	November 9	John Stanton	N/A	1.173
After Donald Trump is elected president, Trevor recaps Democalypse 2016, Michelle Wolf and Hasan Minhaj break down how women and Muslims are reacting, and John Stanton discusses BuzzFeed's election coverage and journalism under a Trump presidency.
2861	November 10	Deborah Lee James & Eric Fanning	N/A	1.012
Barack Obama meets President-elect Trump, Trevor discusses Trump voters and their reasons for support, Ronny Chieng finds new ways to poll the electorate, and Deborah Lee James and Eric Fanning discuss the transition of military power and their role to the President.
2862	November 14	Nate Silver, Adrian Grenier	The Lonely Whale Foundation, FiveThirtyEight	0.838
President-elect Donald Trump backs down on key campaign promises, Trevor talks about Trump's interview on 60 Minutes, Nate Silver discusses FiveThirtyEight and the polling industry, and Adrian Grenier talks about the Lonely Whale Foundation.
2863	November 15	Desus Nice & The Kid Mero	Desus & Mero	0.856
Trevor looks at the future of America by comparing President-Elect Donald Trump to President of South Africa Jacob Zuma, developing countries learn about American democracy (lobbying & gerrymandering), and Desus Nice and The Kid Mero discuss "Desus and Mero".
2864	November 16	Wesley Lowery	Lowery, Wesley (15 November 2016). They Can't Kill Us All: Ferguson, Baltimore, and a New Era in America's Racial Justice Movement. Little, Brown. ISBN 978-0-316-31250-9.	0.926
Former Executive Chairman of Breitbart News and notable alt-right member Steve Bannon joins the Trump administration as Chief Strategist, The Best F#@king News Team (Roy Wood Jr., Desi Lydic, Hasan Minhaj, Jordan Klepper & Ronny Chieng) mourns the death of facts, and Wesley Lowery discusses "They Can't Kill Us All."
2865	November 17	George Packer, Q-Tip	"The Unconnected", The New Yorker (October 31st 2016 issue), We Got It from Here... Thank You 4 Your Service	0.760
President-elect Trump's transition team calls for a Muslim registry, Jordan Klepper & Trevor Noah discuss how to stand up for American Muslims, George Packer discusses The New Yorker, and Q-Tip of A Tribe Called Quest talks the group's reunion album, We Got it From Here...Thank You 4 Your Service.
2866	November 28	Ryan Speedo Green	Bergner, Daniel (27 September 2016). Sing for Your Life: A Story of Race, Music, and Family. Little, Brown. ISBN 978-0-316-30067-4.	0.813
Trevor reflects on Black Friday, Jill Stein files for recounts in swing states, Donald Trump is accused of using his president-elect status to further his business so Trevor takes a look at his potential conflicts of interests, Cuban leader Fidel Castro dies, and Ryan Speedo Green discusses "Sing For Your Life."
2867	November 29	Mahershala Ali	Moonlight	0.886
The media grapples with President-elect Trump's lying, Adam Lowitt weighs in on a Holocaust-themed ice skating performance in Russia, and Mahershala Ali discusses "Moonlight".
2868	November 30	Tomi Lahren	Tomi	0.877
Trevor Noah, Jordan Klepper and Roy Wood Jr. examine Trump administration nominees Jeff Sessions and Steven Mnuchin in the first instalment of "Profiles in Tremendousness", and "Tomi" host Tomi Lahren talks about being a voice for conservatism, Colin Kaepernick's protest, Black Lives Matter, Donald Trump's campaign promises, immigration, etc.

=== December ===
No.	Original air date	Guest(s)	Promotion or Feature	US viewers (millions)
2869	December 1	Chelsea Handler	Chelsea	0.743
Trevor looks at the Indian Government's attempt to demonetise 500 and 1000 rupee notes, problems arise after plans are revealed for the initial route of the Dakota Access Pipeline, Native Americans protest the DAPL at the Standing Rock Reservation, another instalment of "Profiles in Tremendousness": President-elect Trump names Michael T. Flynn national security advisor, and Chelsea Handler discusses "Chelsea" and the 2016 U.S presidential election results.
2870	December 5	Van Jones	The Messy Truth	0.785
Trevor examines the outrage over an African-American mall-Santa at Mall of America, Donald Trump's tweeting habits, another instalment of "Profiles in Tremendousness": Ben Carson is nominated for Secretary of Housing and Urban Development, Jordan Klepper hits Donald Trump's post-election tour and provides another instalment of "Jordan Klepper Fingers the Pulse", and Van Jones discusses "The Messy Truth".
2871	December 6	John Legend	Darkness and Light & La La Land	0.895
Trevor comments on the Austrian presidential election of 2016, President-elect Trump raises eyebrows after talking to the President of Taiwan Tsai Ing-wen, Hasan Minhaj learns how the Navy is going green, and John Legend discusses "La La Land" & "Darkness and Light".
2872	December 7	Brian Tyree Henry	Atlanta	0.830
Trevor discusses Domino's Christmas Reindeer special, Thomas Jefferson (Jordan Klepper) explains the Electoral College, Hasan Minhaj looks at criminals who go viral online, and Brian Tyree Henry discusses his role in "Atlanta".
2873	December 8	Evan McMullin, DJ Khaled	"Trump's Threat to the Constitution" Op-Ed, New York Times, Khaled, D. J. (22 November 2016). The Keys. Bantam Press. ISBN 978-0-593-07837-2. & Get Schooled Foundation	0.785
Trevor reflects on Donald Trump's Labor Secretary Andrew Puzder & E.P.A Administrator Scott Pruitt, President-elect Trump strikes a problematic deal with Carrier to keep jobs in the U.S., Evan McMullin talks about uniting Americans past party lines, and DJ Khaled discusses "The Keys" and "Get Schooled" Foundation.
2874	December 12	President Barack Obama	Obamacare	0.986 (Comedy Central) or 1.552 (All Broadcasts)
Trevor sits down with President Obama at the White House to discuss Russia's impact on the 2016 election, the incoming Trump administration and its ties to Russia, Donald Trump's lack of intelligence briefings, ObamaCare, Obama's post-presidential role in American politics, modern racism and implicit bias. Note: This episode was simulcast on Comedy Central, MTV & BET.
2875	December 13	Ta-Nehisi Coates	"My President Was Black: A history of the first African American White House—and of what came next" article, The Atlantic Magazine (January/February 2017 issue)	0.714
Trevor reflects on his interview with President Barack Obama, another instalment of "Profiles in Tremendousness": Donald Trump picks Rex Tillerson for secretary of state, parody of Shark Tank: The Best F#@king News Team (Desi Lydic, Ronny Chieng & Roy Wood Jr.) designs poop-friendly NASA suits in-front of a panel of judges (Barbara Corcoran & Tim Gunn), and Ta-Nehisi Coates discusses his article "My President Was Black".
2876	December 14	Michael K. Williams	Assassin's Creed	0.917
Trevor reacts to McDonald's new winter cups, Donald Trump admits to campaigning on falsehoods, Desi Lydic and Michelle Wolf examine the future of reproductive rights, and Michael K. Williams discusses "Assassin's Creed".
2877	December 15	Rob Corddry	Office Christmas Party & Ballers	0.824
"The Daily Show's The Yearly Show 2016"; Trevor Noah & The Best F#@king News Team recaps the biggest news of 2016, Desi Lydic looks back at the biggest breakups of 2016 (Jolie-Pitt, Brexit), Hassan Minhaj details the top 3 fake news headlines, Roy Wood Jr. recaps the politicization of sports (Colin Kaepernick anthem protest and 2016 World Series), Ronny Chieng breaks down internet challenges such as the Mannequin Challenge and Water bottle flipping challenge, Jordan Klepper celebrates Donald Trump supporters, and Rob Corddry discusses "Office Christmas Party" & "Ballers".
