= Baldwin High School =

Baldwin High School may refer to:

- Baldwin Middle-Senior High School, Baldwin, Florida
- Baldwin High School (Georgia), Milledgeville, Georgia
- Henry Perrine Baldwin High School, Wailuku, Hawaii
- Baldwin High School (Kansas), Baldwin City, Kansas
- Baldwin Senior High School (Michigan), Baldwin, Michigan
- Baldwin Senior High School (New York), Baldwin, New York
- Baldwin High School (Pennsylvania), Baldwin, Pennsylvania
- The Baldwin School, a private all-girls school in Pennsylvania
