= ABC Person of the Week =

ABC Person of the Week is a feature of ABC World News Tonight that began in 1986 and was still running in 2026. It provides a short biography or story of an interesting person, at the end of the Friday night broadcast, thus having high prominence. For news programs, it is a relatively long segment, running three to four minutes. It often features Americans, either famous or obscure, who have inspiring stories involving selflessness, but is not strictly limited in its focus.

== Background ==
The feature has been presented by ABC News anchors including Charles Gibson, Diane Sawyer, Peter Jennings, George Stephanopoulos, and David Muir.

Not every Friday night broadcast of ABC World News Tonight concludes with the Person of the Week segment. That has happened because the news reporter who normally presents this segment does one of the following instead: recaps the top news story, announces a segment that is usually shown on other nights, reports a more important story (such as a remembrance), takes Friday night off, or, in rare circumstances, interrupts or pre-empts the newscast for an ABC News Special Report. For these reasons, the Person of the Week segment has occasionally been delayed for weeks or even for months.

A 1994 study analyzed the people and values celebrated in its first five years, during which the feature was the ending story on almost every Friday night. The study found that values of "individualism, heroism, and unselfishenss were more commonly portrayed than were populism, capitalism, and patriotism". It found more coverage of white, male, and famous persons, with women more likely to have caretaker roles and with Blacks more likely to have humble backgrounds.

The ABC Person of the Week feature and NBC's "Making a Difference" segments have been described as identifying "genuine heroes" who nonetheless "are forgotten" when the broadcast ends. NBC's feature is lesser known, described as "not unlike" the ABC feature. Craig Barto in USA Today described the segment as "A favorite World News Tonight feature of mine was Jennings' "Person of the Week" — a Friday segment that highlighted a person who accomplished something special. What I liked most about the feature is how it often captured everyday, Average Joes."

When completing her 2009-2014 stint as the ABC News presenter, Diane Sawyer "got nostalgic" about the persons and events covered in the segment. David Muir, who replaced her, grew up watching ABC news closely, including "trying to guess who would be named "person of the week".

== Recipients ==
People covered on the segment have included:

- J. J. Abrams
- Abby Cadabby
- Emilio Amigo: Teacher of autistic students in Ohio.
- Thomas Bopp, co-discoverer of comet Hale-Bopp
- John W. Boyd, Jr.
- Maksim Chmerkovskiy
- Amanda Dunbar
- Caroline Kennedy
- Alan Hale (astronomer), co-discoverer of comet Hale-Bopp
- Jack Healey
- Harper Lee
- Kellie Lim
- Scott Neeson
- Bill Nye
- Randy Pausch, for whom the feature was part of a remarkable rise to prominence
- Angelique Todd
- Stephen Wiltshire
- Edie Windsor

== See also ==
- Upstanders
