= List of The Daily Show episodes (2015) =

2015 season of American television series

- No. of episodes: 101 (under Stewart); 38 (under Noah)

Release
- Original network: Comedy Central
- Original release: January 5 – December 17, 2015

Season chronology
- ← Previous; 2014 episodes Next → 2016 episodes

This is a list of episodes for The Daily Show in 2015. This is the final year of The Daily Show to be hosted by Jon Stewart, whose final episode was on August 6, 2015. This is also the first year of The Daily Show to be hosted by Trevor Noah, whose first episode was on September 28, 2015.

On February 10, 2015, Stewart announced that he would resign at a later time in the year. Stewart's hour-plus-long final episode on August 6 featured reunions with former Daily Show correspondents and cameo video clips from people Stewart had targeted over the years including Bill O'Reilly, John McCain, Chris Christie, and Hillary Clinton. It concluded with a performance by Bruce Springsteen and the E Street Band.

On March 30, 2015, Comedy Central announced that Trevor Noah will become the host of The Daily Show following the departure of Stewart. Noah's half hour-plus-long first episode on September 28 was simulcast by Viacom on Nick-at-Nite, Spike, MTV, MTV2, mtvU, VH1, VH1 Classic, BET, Centric, CMT, TV Land, and Logo TV.

== 2015 (under Stewart) ==
=== January ===
No.	Original air date	Guest(s)	Promotion	US viewers (millions)
2576	January 5	Steven Brill	Brill, Steven (2015). America's Bitter Pill: Money, Politics, Back-Room Deals, and the Fight to Fix Our Broken Healthcare System. Random House. ISBN 978-0812996951.	1.40
The countdown to Democalypse 2016 begins, The Interview triggers tension between the U.S. and North Korea, and Steven Brill discusses his book America's Bitter Pill.
2577	January 6	Cass Sunstein	Sunstein, Cass R.; Hastie, Reid (2015). Wiser: Getting Beyond Groupthink to Make Groups Smarter. Harvard Business Press. ISBN 978-1422122990.	1.16
A new congressional session begins, Staten Island Representative Michael Grimm resigns following tax evasion charges, and Cass Sunstein discusses his book Wiser.
2578	January 7	Ava DuVernay	Selma	1.31
A deadly attack hits Paris, Aasif Mandvi covers Great Britain's Nazi cow problem, Hasan Minhaj reports on homelessness in Salt Lake City, and Ava DuVernay discusses the film Selma.
2579	January 8	Allison Williams	Girls	1.32
Mitch McConnell brags about the Republican Congress, Jason Jones causes mischief in New York after a slowdown in arrests, and Girls star Allison Williams sits down with Jon.
2580	January 12	Jimmy Carter	Countdown to Zero	1.04
Millions march in Paris after the Charlie Hebdo shooting, Rupert Murdoch's tweet sparks a debate, and Jimmy Carter discusses the exhibition Countdown to Zero.
2581	January 13	Marco Rubio	Rubio, Marco (2015). American Dreams: Restoring Economic Opportunity for Everyone. Sentinel. ISBN 978-1595231130.	1.27
Florida legalizes same-sex marriage, a storeowner beats his employees with a lizard, and Senator Marco Rubio discusses his book American Dreams.
2582	January 14	Julianne Moore	Still Alice	1.20
A French comedian is arrested despite the country's stance on free speech, police in the Philippines are ordered to wear diapers, and Julianne Moore discusses Still Alice.
2583	January 15	Sienna Miller	American Sniper	1.16
The Keystone XL pipeline debate continues, Jessica Williams reports on a unique law regarding the right to an attorney, and Sienna Miller discusses American Sniper.
2584	January 19	Mike Huckabee	Huckabee, Mike (20 January 2015). God, Guns, Grits, and Gravy. Macmillan. ISBN 978-1250060990.	1.23
Secretary of State John Kerry visits France, the Miss Universe pageant gets wrapped up in Middle Eastern politics, and Mike Huckabee discusses his book, God, Guns, Grits, and Gravy.
2585	January 20	Jennifer Lopez	The Boy Next Door	1.14
Several Republican candidates consider a bid for president, Aasif Mandvi investigates the threat of Sharia law in Alabama, and Jennifer Lopez discusses The Boy Next Door.
2586	January 21	Anne Hathaway	Song One	1.41
Barack Obama delivers his State of the Union address, multiple Tea Party Republicans respond to the president's speech, and Anne Hathaway discusses her film Song One.
2587	January 22	Jennifer Aniston	Cake	1.26
The World Economic Forum begins in Switzerland, MetLife sues the federal government, Trevor Noah reports on Boko Haram, and Jennifer Aniston discusses her film Cake.
2588	January 26	Julian Castro	N/A	1.44
Presidential hopefuls convene at the Iowa Freedom Summit, Republicans try to appeal to the middle class, and Julian Castro discusses his work at HUD.
2589	January 27	Jill Leovy	Leovy, Jill (2015). Ghettoside: A True Story of Murder in America. Random House Publishing. ISBN 978-0385529983.	1.33
The media fixates on Winter Storm Juno's impact on New York City, a drone crashes into the White House, and journalist Jill Leovy discusses her book Ghettoside.
2590	January 28	Oscar Isaac	A Most Violent Year	1.19
President Obama pays his respects to Saudi Arabia's King Abdullah, Kristen Schaal addresses male oppression on the subway, and Oscar Isaac discusses A Most Violent Year.
2591	January 29	Sarah Chayes	Chayes, Sarah (20 January 2015). Thieves of State: Why Corruption Threatens Global Security. National Geographic Books. ISBN 978-0393239461.	1.23
The Deflategate scandal rocks the NFL right before the Super Bowl, Jessica Williams investigates mixed-party dating, and Sarah Chayes discusses her book Thieves of State.

=== February ===
No.	Original air date	Guest(s)	Promotion	US viewers (millions)
2592	February 2	Martin Short	Short, Martin (4 November 2014). I Must Say: My Life As a Humble Comedy Legend. HarperCollins. ISBN 978-0062309525.	1.28
Mike Huckabee tackles the topic of same-sex marriage during his book tour, Jordan Klepper reports on China's magic industry, and Martin Short discusses I Must Say.
2593	February 3	Bill Browder	Browder, Bill (3 February 2015). Red Notice: A True Story of High Finance, Murder, and One Man's Fight for Justice. Simon and Schuster. ISBN 978-1476755717.	1.18
Measles makes a shocking comeback, groundhogs get their yearly moment in the spotlight, and Bill Browder discusses his book Red Notice.
2594	February 4	Wes Moore	Moore, Wes (2014). The Work: My Search for a Life That Matters. Spiegel & Grau. ISBN 978-0812993578.	1.22
The 114th Congress celebrates one month in office, Senator Thom Tillis suggests that public health standards are overrated, and Wes Moore discusses his book The Work.
2595	February 5	Bob Odenkirk	Better Call Saul	1.25
Strong contenders for the 2016 race begin to emerge, John Boehner invites Israeli Prime Minister Benjamin Netanyahu to Congress, and Bob Odenkirk discusses Better Call Saul.
2596	February 9	Patricia Arquette	Boyhood	1.26
Brian Williams comes under fire for misleading the public, Bassem Youssef reflects on the quagmire in the Middle East, and Patricia Arquette discusses her film Boyhood.
2597	February 10	David Axelrod	Axelrod, David (2015). Believer: My Forty Years in Politics. Penguin Press. ISBN 978-1594205873.	1.65
Fox News adds an ironic twist to its complaints about President Obama, political strategist David Axelrod discusses his book Believer, and Jon announces his retirement from hosting the show.
2598	February 11	Colin Firth	Kingsman: The Secret Service	1.47
Kansas and Alabama make conditions worse for same-sex couples, Jordan Klepper speaks with a group of Las Vegas teens about sex education, and Colin Firth discusses Kingsman: The Secret Service.
2599	February 23	Christine Lagarde	N/A	1.42
Conservatives criticize President Obama's ISIS offensive while Rudy Giuliani questions his patriotism, and Christine Lagarde discusses the International Monetary Fund.
2600	February 24	Lynsey Addario	Addario, Lynsey (2015). It's What I Do: A Photographer's Life of Love and War. Penguin. ISBN 978-1594205378.	1.19
An article in Mother Jones questions Bill O'Reilly's credibility, Samantha Bee reports on Vice President Biden's bad habit, and Lynsey Addario discusses "It's What I Do."
2601	February 25	Conan O'Brien	Conan	1.33
Conservative pundits question Jon's honor, Congressman Aaron Schock posts his possibly publicly funded adventures on Instagram, and Conan O'Brien discusses his trip to Cuba.
2602	February 26	Olivia Wilde	The Lazarus Effect	1.07
Several whistleblowers are penalized after exposing misconduct, Hasan Minhaj tackles inequality among the 1%, and Olivia Wilde discusses her film "The Lazarus Effect."

=== March ===
No.	Original air date	Guest(s)	Promotion	US viewers (millions)
2603	March 2	Robert Smigel	Night Of Too Many Stars	1.17
Congress threatens to defund the Department of Homeland Security, Senator Jim Inhofe argues against climate change, and Robert Smigel discusses Night of Too Many Stars.
2604	March 3	Sigourney Weaver	Chappie	1.19
Benjamin Netanyahu is invited to speak before Congress, Aasif Mandvi reveals a potential future for print media, and Sigourney Weaver discusses her film "Chappie."
2605	March 4	Viacheslav Fetisov	Red Army	1.23
Hillary Clinton's informal emailing style causes controversy, Jordan Klepper reports on a surprising Florida law, and Viacheslav Fetisov discusses the documentary "Red Army."
2606	March 5	Gerald Posner	Posner, Gerald (3 February 2015). God's Bankers: A History of Money and Power at the Vatican. Simon and Schuster. ISBN 978-1416576570.	1.17
Jessica Williams reports on the DOJ's investigation into Ferguson, MO, opposition leader Boris Nemtsov murdered in Russia, and Gerald Posner discusses "God's Bankers."
2607	March 9	John Lewis	March: Book Two	1.30
The U.S. commemorates the 50th anniversary of "Bloody Sunday" in Selma, and Congressman John Lewis reflects on the civil rights movement in his graphic novel trilogy, "March."
2608	March 10	Abbi Jacobson & Ilana Glazer	Broad City	1.31
Senate Republicans send a letter to Ayatollah Ali Khamenei, Lewis Black investigates animal cruelty, and Abbi Jacobson and Ilana Glazer discuss Broad City.
2609	March 11	Common	Run All Night	1.24
Fraternity brothers are caught on tape chanting racial slurs, Hillary Clinton gives an explanation for her informal email practices, and Common discusses "Run All Night."
2610	March 12	Rob Corddry	Childrens Hospital	1.24
Several New Jersey officials engage in questionable practices, Jordan Klepper reports on Hurricane Sandy survivors, and Rob Corddry discusses his show Childrens Hospital.
2611	March 16	Andrew Cockburn	Cockburn, Andrew (10 March 2015). Kill Chain: The Rise of the High-Tech Assassins. Macmillan. ISBN 978-0805099263.	1.20
Several states work to erase equal rights for the LGBT community, the Secret Service and the media require interventions, and Andrew Cockburn discusses his book "Kill Chain."
2612	March 17	Amanda Seyfried	While We're Young	1.17
Democrats filibuster a bipartisan human trafficking bill, the food industry takes varying approaches to the obesity crisis, and Amanda Seyfried discusses "While We're Young."
2613	March 18	Kevin Hart	Get Hard	1.21
Congressman Aaron Schock resigns following inquiries into his use of taxpayer dollars, Benjamin Netanyahu wins re-election in Israel, and Kevin Hart discusses "Get Hard."
2614	March 19	Will Ferrell	Get Hard	1.25
Fox News selectively covers the Department of Justice reports on Ferguson, Trevor Noah challenges Jon to a chess game, and Will Ferrell discusses his film "Get Hard."
2615	March 23	Ayaan Hirsi Ali	Ali, Ayaan Hirsi (24 March 2015). Heretic: Why Islam Needs A Reformation Now. HarperCollins. ISBN 978-0062333933.	1.28
The V.A. continues its legacy of inadequacy, Senator Ted Cruz officially announces his plans to run for president, and Ayaan Hirsi Ali discusses her book "Heretic."
2616	March 24	Jon Ronson	Ronson, Jon (2015). So You've Been Publicly Shamed. Penguin. ISBN 978-1594487132.	1.23
A sex-trafficking bill remains stuck in Congress, Kristen Schaal reports on gender wage equality, and Jon Ronson discusses his book "So You've Been Publicly Shamed."
2617	March 25	Kirby Dick & Amy Ziering	The Hunting Ground	1.26
California and Florida feel the effects of climate change, Hasan Minhaj interviews an Oregon pot grower, and Kirby Dick and Amy Ziering discuss "The Hunting Ground."
2618	March 26	John Hargrove	Hargrove, John; Chua-Eoan, Howard (24 March 2015). Beneath the Surface: Killer Whales, SeaWorld, and the Truth Beyond Blackfish. Macmillan. ISBN 978-1137280107.	1.24
Jason Jones bids farewell to The Daily Show, Jon congratulates Fox News for being right, and former orca trainer John Hargrove discusses his book "Beneath the Surface."

=== April ===
No.	Original air date	Guest(s)	Promotion	US viewers (millions)
2619	April 6	Gene Baur	Baur, Gene; Stone, Gene (7 April 2015). Living the Farm Sanctuary Life: The Ultimate Guide to Eating Mindfully, Living Longer, and Feeling Better. Rodale. ISBN 978-1623364892.	0.919
Indiana passes a controversial religious freedom law, Jordan Klepper chases after crowdfunding donations, and Gene Baur discusses his book "Living the Farm Sanctuary Life."
2620	April 7	Peter Dinklage	Game of Thrones	1.283
Hasan Minhaj reports on the U.S.-Iran nuclear deal, Senator Rand Paul announces his presidential bid, and Peter Dinklage discusses the fifth season of "Game of Thrones."
2621	April 8	Tavis Smiley	Smiley, Tavis (7 April 2015). My Journey with Maya. Little, Brown. ISBN 978-0316341752.	1.010
Rolling Stone retracts an article, Samantha Bee reports on a shocking custody issue, Mayor Rahm Emanuel wins re-election, and Tavis Smiley discusses "My Journey with Maya."
2622	April 9	Elizabeth Warren	Warren, Elizabeth (31 March 2015). A Fighting Chance. Picador. ISBN 978-1250062253.	1.043
Kansas passes a lenient gun safety law while enforcing harsh welfare regulations, and Senator Elizabeth Warren discusses corruption, student debt and "A Fighting Chance."
2623	April 13	Adam Horovitz	While We're Young	1.195
Hillary Clinton announces her presidential bid, Bassem Youssef unpacks the confusing proxy wars in the Middle East, and Adam Horovitz discusses his film "While We're Young."
2624	April 14	Fareed Zakaria	Zakaria, Fareed (21 April 2015). In Defense of a Liberal Education. National Geographic Books. ISBN 978-0393247688.	1.255
Congress criticizes a proposed treaty with Iran, Hillary Clinton overshadows Marco Rubio's presidential bid, and Fareed Zakaria discusses his book, "In Defense of a Liberal Education."
2625	April 15	Billy Crystal	The Comedians	1.128
The media struggles to deliver relevant content in appropriate ways, Jordan Klepper investigates the future of Christianity, and Billy Crystal discusses "The Comedians."
2626	April 16	Eric Greitens	Greitens, Eric (2015). Resilience: Hard-Won Wisdom for Living a Better Life. Houghton Mifflin Harcourt. ISBN 978-0544323988.	1.274
Dick Cheney criticizes President Obama's nuclear negotiations with Iran, the winner of the 2015 'Mercun Awards emerges, and Eric Greitens discusses his book "Resilience."
2627	April 20	Gayle Tzemach Lemmon	Lemmon, Gayle Tzemach (21 April 2015). Ashley's War: The Untold Story of a Team of Women Soldiers on the Special Ops Battlefield. HarperCollins. ISBN 978-0062333810.	1.078
The Best F#@king News Team Ever envisions if life were like Congress, CNN adds 4/20 coverage to its programming, and Gayle Tzemach Lemmon discusses her book "Ashley's War."
2628	April 21	Jeff Garlin	The Goldbergs	1.241
Republican candidates update their positions on same-sex marriage, a man flies past Capitol security in a gyrocopter, and Jeff Garlin offers Jon a part on "The Goldbergs."
2629	April 22	Dana Perino	Perino, Dana (21 April 2015). And the Good News Is...: Lessons and Advice from the Bright Side. Grand Central. ISBN 978-1455584901.	0.987
Unethical Atlanta educators share similarities with Wall Street bankers, Aasif Mandvi uncovers a GMO conspiracy, and Dana Perino discusses her book "And the Good News Is..."
2630	April 23	Neil deGrasse Tyson	StarTalk	1.051
Fracking causes earthquakes in Oklahoma, the NSA debuts a creepy recycling mascot, John Hodgman makes a dramatic exit, and Neil deGrasse Tyson discusses "StarTalk."
2631	April 27	Elizabeth Olsen	Avengers: Age of Ultron	1.272
The media misses an important Baltimore news story during the White House Correspondents' Dinner, and Elizabeth Olsen discusses her film "Avengers: Age of Ultron."
2632	April 28	George Stephanopoulos	N/A	1.271
Baltimore's mayor declares a state of emergency, Hasan Minhaj reports on bipartisan prison reform, and George Stephanopoulos discusses the responsibility of the media.
2633	April 29	Judith Miller	Miller, Judith (7 April 2015). The Story: A Reporter's Journey. Simon and Schuster. ISBN 978-1476716015.	1.141
The Supreme Court considers the legality of same-sex marriage, and Judith Miller discusses the lead-up to the Iraq War and her memoir, "The Story: A Reporter's Journey."
2634	April 30	Kristen Wiig	Welcome to Me	0.966
Senator Bernie Sanders enters the presidential race, Hillary Clinton faces corruption rumors, Samantha Bee enjoys her last day, and Kristen Wiig discusses "Welcome to Me."

=== May ===
No.	Original air date	Guest(s)	Promotion	US viewers (millions)
2635	May 4	Brian Grazer	Grazer, Brian; Fishman, Charles (7 April 2015). A Curious Mind: The Secret to a Bigger Life. Simon and Schuster. ISBN 978-1476730752.	1.187
Texan conspiracy theorists fear a military takeover, Jessica Williams investigates the end of same-sex marriage protests, and Brian Grazer discusses his book "A Curious Mind."
2636	May 5	Willie Nelson	Nelson, Willie (5 May 2015). It's a Long Story: My Life. Little, Brown. ISBN 978-0316403559.	1.357
Three Republican candidates join the presidential race, Senator Ted Cruz contradicts his own principles, and Willie Nelson discusses his memoir "It's a Long Story: My Life."
2637	May 6	Ernest Moniz	N/A	1.069
New York and New Jersey each face corruption scandals, Al Madrigal predicts who will win the Latino vote in 2016, and Ernest Moniz discusses the U.S.'s nuclear deal with Iran.
2638	May 7	Mumford & Sons	Wilder Mind	1.192
Regulation of campaign financing reaches new lows, a report exposes Tom Brady's knowledge of Deflategate, and Mumford & Sons performs a song from their album "Wilder Mind."
2639	May 11	John Legend	Southern Rites	1.031
David Cameron wins re-election in the U.K., Jordan Klepper investigates the role of money in British democracy, and John Legend discusses the documentary "Southern Rites."
2640	May 12	Tom Brokaw	Brokaw, Tom (12 May 2015). A Lucky Life Interrupted: A Memoir of Hope. Random House Publishing. ISBN 978-1-4000-6969-9.	1.133
The vetting process for the 2016 presidential candidates begins, Kristen Schaal reports on the "dad bod" trend, and Tom Brokaw discusses his memoir "A Lucky Life Interrupted."
2641	May 13	Reza Aslan	N/A	1.067
Fox News takes issue with Barack Obama's stance on poverty, Jordan Klepper looks for controversial topics in the British election, and Reza Aslan discusses the state of Islam.
2642	May 14	Rebel Wilson	Pitch Perfect 2	0.945
Jeb Bush beats around the bush regarding the Iraq War and his candidacy, Lewis Black reports on several Nazi-related stories, and Rebel Wilson discusses "Pitch Perfect 2."
2643	May 26	Rand Paul	N/A	1.280
Sections of the Patriot Act near expiration, Republicans propose a new surveillance act, and Sen. Rand Paul discusses his 11-hour filibuster and religious liberties.
2644	May 27	Rosabeth Moss Kanter	Kanter, Rosabeth Moss (12 May 2015). Move: Putting America's Infrastructure Back in the Lead. National Geographic Books. ISBN 978-0-3932-4680-3.	1.066
Several top FIFA officials face corruption charges, allergy season reaches catastrophic levels, and Rosabeth Moss Kanter discusses her book "Move."
2645	May 28	Matt Harvey	N/A	1.275
Senator Bernie Sanders begins his presidential campaign, ISIS attacks a major Iraqi city, and Matt Harvey discusses his pitching career with the New York Mets.

=== June ===
No.	Original air date	Guest(s)	Promotion	US viewers (millions)
2646	June 1	Stanley McChrystal	McChrystal, General Stanley; Collins, Tantum; Silverman, David; Fussell, Chris (12 May 2015). Team of Teams: New Rules of Engagement for a Complex World. Penguin. ISBN 978-1-5918-4748-9.	1.126
Jordan Klepper finds a new use for the NSA, Senator Lindsey Graham enters the presidential race, and General Stanley McChrystal discusses his book "Team of Teams."
2647	June 2	Bill de Blasio	N/A	1.202
A CIA study analyzes America's armament of the Middle East, the media react to Caitlyn Jenner's debut, and New York City Mayor Bill de Blasio outlines his progressive agenda.
2648	June 3	Melissa McCarthy	Spy	1.316
Hasan Minhaj gives Muslim women advice on downplaying their religion, Jordan Klepper investigates free-range parenting, and Melissa McCarthy chats about her film "Spy".
2649	June 4	Steve Buscemi	Park Bench	1.144
Governors Lincoln Chafee and Rick Perry kick off their presidential campaigns, John Hodgman celebrates Jon's eloquence, and Steve Buscemi discusses his talk show "Park Bench."
2650	June 8	Nicola Sturgeon	N/A	1.074
Texas cops use excessive force at a pool party, Republican candidates head to Iowa, and Scottish First Minister Nicola Sturgeon discusses seceding from the United Kingdom
2651	June 9	Nick Offerman	Offerman, Nick (26 May 2015). Gumption: Relighting the Torch of Freedom with America's Gutsiest Troublemakers. Penguin Publishing. ISBN 978-0-5259-5467-5.	1.024
President Obama attends the G7 summit, CNN's Chris Cuomo and Governor Andrew Cuomo broadcast their sibling rivalry, and Nick Offerman discusses his book "Gumption."
2652	June 10	Colin Quinn	Quinn, Colin (9 June 2015). The Coloring Book: A Comedian Solves Race Relations in America. Grand Central. ISBN 978-1-4555-0759-7.	1.187
California's drought leads to unpopular water-saving strategies, The New York Times investigates Senator Marco Rubio's spending, and Colin Quinn discusses "The Coloring Book."
2653	June 11	Mark Ruffalo	Infinitely Polar Bear	0.949
Former Defense Secretary Donald Rumsfeld reflects on his role in the Iraq War, Jon looks back at past interviews, and Mark Ruffalo discusses his movie "Infinitely Polar Bear".
2654	June 15	Judd Apatow	Apatow, Judd (2015). Sick in the Head: Conversations About Life and Comedy. Random House. ISBN 978-0-8129-9757-6.	1.088
NAACP leader Rachel Dolezal is accused of misrepresenting her race, Al Madrigal learns about Iowa's voting process, and Judd Apatow discusses his book "Sick in the Head."
2655	June 16	Aziz Ansari	Ansari, Aziz; Klinenberg, Eric (16 June 2015). Modern Romance: An Investigation. Penguin Publishing. ISBN 978-1-5942-0627-6.	1.177
Donald Trump enters the 2016 presidential race, a restaurant chain unveils a troubling new dish, and comedian Aziz Ansari explores dating trends in his book "Modern Romance."
2656	June 17	Bill Clinton	N/A	1.433
Jon relives Donald Trump's presidential announcement speech, the House of Representatives votes on trade legislation, and Bill Clinton discusses the U.S.'s economic prospects.
2657	June 18	Malala Yousafzai	He Named Me Malala	1.134
Jon speaks out about the church massacre in Charleston, S.C., and Nobel Peace Prize Laureate Malala Yousafzai discusses the documentary "He Named Me Malala".
2658	June 22	Al Franken	N/A	1.234
Fox News accuses liberals of politicizing the South Carolina shooting, Jessica Williams takes on the Confederate flag, and Al Franken discusses going from comedy to Congress.
2659	June 23	Seth MacFarlane	Ted 2	1.337
Presidential contender Donald Trump establishes his campaign platform, Hasan Minhaj honors Jon's physical fortitude, and director Seth MacFarlane discusses his movie "Ted 2".
2660	June 24	Andrew Napolitano	N/A	1.442
Southern states consider taking down the Confederate flag, Jessica Williams weighs in on the idea of a female-fronted $10 bill, and Andrew Napolitano discusses free speech.
2661	June 25	Richard Lewis	Lewis, Richard (5 May 2015). Reflections From Hell: Richard Lewis' Guide On How Not to Live. powerHouse Books. ISBN 978-1-5768-7745-6.	1.301
Pope Francis upsets Republicans with his remarks on global warming, Bobby Jindal enters the presidential race, and comedian Richard Lewis discusses his show "Blunt Talk."
2662	June 29	Taylor Schilling	The Overnight	1.320
Conservatives react to the Supreme Court's ruling on marriage equality, Justice Antonin Scalia issues an unusual dissent, and Taylor Schilling discusses "The Overnight."
2663	June 30	Jon Hamm	Minions	1.341
Conservatives win big in Supreme Court rulings on environmental regulations and the death penalty, Jon sings the news, and Jon Hamm discusses his film "Minions".

=== July ===
No.	Original air date	Guest(s)	Promotion	US viewers (millions)
2664	July 1	Kirsten Gillibrand	N/A	1.457
Gov. Chris Christie kicks off his presidential campaign, and Sen. Kirsten Gillibrand describes finding common ground in Congress and working to pass a paid family leave bill.
2665	July 2	Sarah Vowell	Vowell, Sarah (2015). Lafayette in the Somewhat United States. Riverhead Books. ISBN 978-1-5946-3174-0.	1.162
Donald Trump defends his racist remarks, Ohioans fight a Native American group over an Alaskan mountain, and Sarah Vowell discusses "Lafayette in the Somewhat United States."
2666	July 20	Paul Rudd	Ant-Man	1.232
Donald Trump's remarks about John McCain not being a war hero keep Jon from discussing real stories that occurred during their break. Jordan Klepper discusses past presidential jerks. Paul Rudd talks about his new film and status as a superhero.
2667	July 21	President Barack Obama	N/A	1.514
President Obama makes his seventh and final appearance on The Daily Show with Jon Stewart. Topics of discussion include retirement, foreign policy and healthcare.
2668	July 22	Jake Gyllenhaal	Southpaw	1.281
Republicans criticize the U.S.'s nuclear deal with Iran, Senator Chuck Schumer reviews New York City diners with MSNBC, and Jake Gyllenhaal talks about his film "Southpaw."
2669	July 23	Ta-Nehisi Coates	Between the World and Me	1.402
Donald Trump remains the most entertaining 2016 presidential candidate, Chuck Schumer wishes Jon mazel tov, and Ta-Nehisi Coates discusses his book "Between the World and Me."
2670	July 27	David McCullough	McCullough, David (5 May 2015). The Wright Brothers. Simon and Schuster. ISBN 978-1-4767-2874-2.	1.210
FBI officials warn of ISIS's Twitter capabilities, Mike Huckabee likens the Iran nuclear deal to the Holocaust, and David McCullough discusses his book "The Wright Brothers."
2671	July 28	Tom Cruise	Mission: Impossible – Rogue Nation	1.189
President Obama visits Ethiopia and Kenya, Hasan Minhaj and Jordan Klepper make Jon answer fans' questions, and Tom Cruise discusses "Mission: Impossible – Rogue Nation."
2672	July 29	Doris Kearns Goodwin	Goodwin, Doris Kearns (15 June 1991). Lyndon Johnson and the American Dream: The Most Revealing Portrait of a President and Presidential Power Ever Written. St. Martin's Publishing. ISBN 978-0-3120-6027-5.	1.320
Jon's White House visit leads to wild media speculation, an Arkansas pastor takes on LGBT rights, and Doris Kearns Goodwin discusses "Lyndon Johnson and the American Dream."
2673	July 30	J. J. Abrams	Mission: Impossible – Rogue Nation	1.279
Republicans battle for a place at the primary debates, Seth Rollins presents a look back at show sponsors, and J. J. Abrams discuses Mission: Impossible – Rogue Nation.

=== August ===
No.	Original air date	Guest(s)	Promotion	US viewers (millions)
2674	August 3	Amy Schumer	Trainwreck	1.712
The Koch brothers make five Republican candidates vie for their money, Fox News accuses Jon of being a liberal propagandist, and Amy Schumer discusses her movie "Trainwreck."
2675	August 4	Denis Leary	Sex&Drugs&Rock&Roll	1.580
Hillary Clinton prepares for Joe Biden's alleged presidential run, Jessica Williams revisits subjects from past field pieces, and Denis Leary discusses "Sex&Drugs&Rock&Roll."
2676	August 5	Louis C.K.	Louie; Louis C.K.: Live at Madison Square Garden	1.821
In his penultimate show, Jon examines his legacy of eviscerating the opposition ("The Daily Show: Destroyer of Worlds") and reflects on his more noteworthy TV moments; Jon and Louis C.K. discuss returning to stand-up comedy.
2677	August 6	Bruce Springsteen and the E Street Band	N/A	3.471
Jon Stewart's final episode as TDS host begins with Jessica Williams, Hasan Minhaj, and Jordan Klepper covering the GOP presidential debate, but grows into tributes to Jon from The Best F#@king News Team Ever, frequent targets of his critiques, and well wishes from former host Craig Kilborn and longtime regulars John Oliver and Stephen Colbert; Jon salutes the behind-the-scenes staffers in a Goodfellas-style tracking shot (featuring a cameo from Martin Scorsese); Jon comments on how "bullshit is everywhere"; "My Moment of Zen" (Bruce Springsteen and the E Street Band perform "Land of Hope and Dreams" and the final verse of "Born to Run").

== 2015 (under Noah) ==
=== September ===
No.	Original air date	Guest(s)	Promotion	US viewers (millions)
2678	September 28	Kevin Hart	Ride Along 2	3.411
Trevor Noah's first episode as the new host of The Daily Show. Noah begins by acknowledging his predecessor Jon Stewart, pledging to continue the "war on bullshit" that Stewart waged during his tenure as host. Pope Francis visits the United States, John Boehner resigns as Speaker of the House, NASA finds evidence of water on Mars, and comedian Kevin Hart discusses his film, Ride Along 2. Note: The original airing of this episode was simulcast by Viacom on Comedy Central, Nick-at-Nite, Spike, MTV, MTV2, mtvU, VH1, VH1 Classic, BET, Centric, CMT, TV Land, and Logo TV.
2679	September 29	Whitney Wolfe Herd	Bumble	1.231
President Obama and Vladimir Putin meet for an uncomfortable dinner, ISIS fills the black market with ancient relics, and Bumble founder Whitney Wolfe discusses dating trends.
2680	September 30	Governor Chris Christie	Chris Christie presidential campaign, 2016	1.042
Jordan Klepper and Roy Wood, Jr. investigate police bias, Al Madrigal looks into espionage rumors at the Waldorf Astoria, and Chris Christie discusses his presidential bid.

=== October ===
No.	Original air date	Guest(s)	Promotion	US viewers (millions)
2681	October 1	Ryan Adams	1989	0.712
Donald Trump proves to be a viable African president, The Best F#@king News Team Ever celebrates autumn, and Ryan Adams covers Taylor Swift's songs from his album "1989."
2682	October 5	Seth Rogen	Steve Jobs	0.988
Trevor examines pro-lifers' stance on guns, Jessica Williams finds an efficient way to report on a mass shooting in Oregon, and Seth Rogen discusses his film "Steve Jobs."
2683	October 6	Aaron Sorkin	Steve Jobs	0.912
Jordan Klepper weighs in on the ethics of using Uber, Hasan Minhaj examines the robots threaten the jobs of journalists, and screenwriter Aaron Sorkin discusses his film "Steve Jobs."
2684	October 7	Evgeny Afineevsky	Winter on Fire: Ukraine's Fight for Freedom	0.725
Ben Carson defends his response to a school shooting in Oregon, Ronny Chieng explores virtual reality, and Evgeny Afineevsky discusses his documentary "Winter on Fire."
2685	October 8	Rachel Maddow	N/A	0.827
Hasan Minhaj investigates a fair-hiring campaign for former offenders, Rupert Murdoch endorses Ben Carson, and Rachel Maddow weighs in on the 2016 election.
2686	October 12	Ta-Nehisi Coates	The Atlantic October 2015 cover story: The Black Family in the Age of Mass Incarceration	0.823
Roy Wood, Jr. visits the Justice or Else rally to celebrate the 20th anniversary of the Million Man March, CNN gets ready to host the first Democratic presidential debate, and Ta-Nehisi Coates discusses mass incarceration in the U.S.
2687	October 13	Richard Dawkins	Brief Candle in the Dark: My Life in Science	0.789
Republicans court Paul Ryan for Speaker of the House, Lewis Black examines how businesses attract millennials, and Richard Dawkins discusses "Brief Candle in the Dark."
2688	October 14	Tom Hiddleston	Crimson Peak	0.829
The Best F#@king News Team Ever recaps the Democratic presidential debate, CNN unleashes its best Las Vegas puns, and Tom Hiddleston discusses his movie "Crimson Peak."
2689	October 15	Jack Black	Goosebumps	0.646
The FBI investigates fantasy sports sites for insider trading, an Illinois mayor falls victim to a Twitter parody account, and Jack Black discusses his film "Goosebumps."
2690	October 19	Martin O'Malley	Martin O'Malley presidential campaign, 2016	0.562
CNN declares Hillary Clinton the winner of the first Democratic debate, Donald Trump and Jeb Bush argue on Twitter, and Martin O'Malley discusses his presidential bid.
2691	October 20	Judah Friedlander	Friedlander, Judah (20 October 2015). If the Raindrops United: Drawings and Cartoons. Hachette Books. ISBN 978-0-3163-0695-9.	0.760
Jordan Klepper dissects racial diversity in "Star Wars," Wolf Blitzer shames presidential hopeful Lincoln Chafee, and Judah Friedlander discusses "If the Raindrops United."
2692	October 21	Brie Larson	Room	0.755
Joe Biden decides not to run for president, Jordan Klepper reports on an Illinois couple unable to cash a lottery check due to budget cuts, and Brie Larson discusses "Room."
2693	October 22	John Harwood	N/A	0.784
Hillary Clinton testifies at the eighth Benghazi hearing, Jeb Bush calls Supergirl "hot," and CNBC's John Harwood discusses moderating a Republican presidential debate.

=== November ===
No.	Original air date	Guest(s)	Promotion	US viewers (millions)
2694	November 2	Fareed Zakaria	Long Road to Hell	0.662
President Obama sends ground troops to fight ISIS in Syria, police remain fearful of public scrutiny, and Fareed Zakaria discusses his documentary "Long Road to Hell."
2695	November 3	Gloria Steinem	Steinem, Gloria (27 October 2015). My Life on the Road. Random House Publishing. ISBN 978-0-6794-5620-9.	0.659
Jordan Klepper explains why Iowa is afraid of The Daily Show, GOP presidential hopefuls submit their debate demands, and Gloria Steinem discusses "My Life on the Road."
2696	November 5	Regina King	The Leftovers	0.816
The Best F#@king News Team Ever visits Trevor after he has an emergency appendectomy, Desi Lydic examines how Republican officials in Nebraska were able to abolish the state's death penalty through conservative politicking, China ends its one-child policy, and actress Regina King discusses "The Leftovers."
2697	November 9	Pras	Sweet Micky for President	0.689
Presidential hopeful Ben Carson defends his violent past, Ronny Chieng examines outdated voting machines, and Pras discusses "Sweet Micky for President."
2698	November 10	Dan Price	N/A	0.756
Donald Trump calls for a Starbucks boycott, the U.S. builds a $43 million gas station in Afghanistan, and Gravity Payments CEO Dan Price explains his company's salary minimum.
2699	November 11	Chris Hayes	N/A	0.895
Desi Lydic fact-checks GOP presidential candidates' statements from the Republican debate, and MSNBC's Chris Hayes weighs in on the presidential hopefuls.
2700	November 12	Christine and the Queens	N/A	0.822
Jordan Klepper investigates campaign finance reform, Trevor presents The Myanmar Daily Show, and Christine and The Queens perform "Tilted" and "It."
2701	November 16	David Holbrooke	The Diplomat	0.787
Trevor addresses the terrorist attacks in Paris, Desi Lydic fact-checks the latest Democratic debate, and David Holbrooke discusses his documentary "The Diplomat."
2702	November 17	Timbaland	Timbaland (2015). The Emperor of Sound: A Memoir. Harper Collins USA. ISBN 978-0-0619-3696-8.	0.701
Trevor examines the politicization of the ISIS attacks in Paris, Roy Wood Jr. explains why Alabama is refusing Syrian refugees, and Timbaland discusses "The Emperor of Sound."
2703	November 18	Ted Koppel	Koppel, Ted (2015). Lights Out: A Cyberattack, A Nation Unprepared, Surviving the Aftermath. Crown Publishers. ISBN 978-0-5534-1996-2.	0.752
Jessica Williams explains why Ben Carson dropped a foreign policy adviser, Kristen Schaal weighs in on schools that prohibit leggings, and Ted Koppel discusses "Lights Out."
2704	November 19	David Rees	Going Deep with David Rees	0.850
Mike Huckabee equates Syrian refugees with food, a lone Missourian decides the fate of her district's sales tax, and David Rees talks about "Going Deep with David Rees."
2705	November 30	Spike Lee	Chi-Raq	0.759
Donald Trump mocks a handicapped reporter, Jordan Klepper weighs in on a shooting at Planned Parenthood, and filmmaker Spike Lee discusses "Chi-Raq."

=== December ===
No.	Original air date	Guest(s)	Promotion	US viewers (millions)
2706	December 1	Nick Cannon	Chi-Raq	0.831
World leaders head to Paris, France for the COP21 climate conference, Jessica Williams searches for a hoverboard that actually flies, and Nick Cannon discusses the film "Chi-Raq." Note: Rapper Chris Brown was originally scheduled to be the guest in this episode, but was quietly replaced shortly before the taping.
2707	December 2	Lupita Nyong'o	Star Wars: The Force Awakens & Eclipsed	0.970
Hacking activist group Anonymous declares war on ISIS, Jordan Klepper examines the food industry, and Lupita Nyong'o discusses "Star Wars: The Force Awakens" and "Eclipsed."
2708	December 3	Idris Elba	Luther	0.765
President Obama addresses a mass shooting in Southern California, Ted Cruz releases hours of raw footage from filming campaign ads, and Idris Elba discusses "Luther."
2709	December 7	Jon Stewart	Zadroga Act	0.804
MSNBC ransacks the home of terrorism suspects on live TV, and former Daily Show host Jon Stewart returns to shame Congress into renewing health care for 9/11 first responders.
2710	December 8	Thomas Perez	N/A	0.860
Donald Trump proposes banning all Muslims from entering the U.S., Hasan Minhaj discusses positive views on banning all Muslims from entering the U.S., and Secretary of Labor Thomas Perez discusses job growth.
2711	December 9	Marion Cotillard	Macbeth	1.077
World leaders aim to stop world temperatures from rising above 2 degrees celsius at the COP21 climate conference in Paris, Adam Lowitt discusses the Republican Jewish Coalition, and Marion Cotillard discusses her new film Macbeth.
2712	December 10	Michael Strahan	Strahan, Michael; Chambers, Veronica (13 October 2015). Wake Up Happy: The Dream Big, Win Big Guide to Transforming Your Life. Simon and Schuster. ISBN 978-1-4767-7568-5.	0.681
Gun demand spikes following the San Bernardino shooting, Jordan Klepper investigates gun ownership and "good guy" scenarios in mass shootings, and Michael Strahan discusses his new book Wake up Happy.
2713	December 14	Andy Cohen	Watch What Happens: Live, Then and Now	0.848
ISIS releases a Chinese recruitment song, The Best F#@king News Team debates a controversial zombie nativity scene, and Andy Cohen discusses his miniseries "Then and Now."
2714	December 15	Pusha T	King Push – Darkest Before Dawn: The Prelude	0.633
Jeb Bush promises to stop spamming his supporters, Donald Trump releases his bill of health, and Pusha T performs "Sunshine" and "Crutches, Crosses, Caskets."
2715	December 16	Will Smith	Concussion	0.935
Jeb Bush stands up to Donald Trump during the latest GOP debate, Desi Lydic fact-checks the Republican candidates, and Will Smith discusses the biopic "Concussion."
2716	December 17	Will Ferrell	Daddy's Home	0.877
The Best F#@king News Team reviews the biggest headlines of 2015, North Korean leader Kim Jong-un assembles a pop supergroup, and Will Ferrell chats about "Daddy's Home."
