= List of The Daily Show episodes (2014) =

- No. of episodes: 159

Release
- Original network: Comedy Central

Season chronology
- ← Previous; 2013 episodes Next → 2015 episodes

This is a list of episodes for The Daily Show with Jon Stewart in 2014.

== 2014 ==
=== January ===
Original air date	Guest(s)	Promotion
January 6	Oscar Isaac	Inside Llewyn Davis
Harsh winter conditions disprove global warming, the White House takes on the nuns, and "Inside Llewyn Davis" star Oscar Isaac remembers his punk rock roots.
January 7	Steve Coogan	Philomena
Colorado opens for recreational weed business, beer advertisers earn America's trust with snow bikini parties, and Steve Coogan discusses "Philomena."
January 8	Richard Cordray	N/A
Chris Christie gets jammed by traffic, Aasif Mandvi learns about "brosurance," and Richard Cordray discusses the Consumer Financial Protection Bureau.
January 9	Scarlett Johansson	Her
Long-term unemployment benefits lapse, Chris Christie addresses his role in the Bridgegate scandal, and Scarlett Johansson talks post-modern dating in "Her."
January 13	Roger Ross Williams	God Loves Uganda
A chemical spill leaves thousands without water in West Virginia, Bill de Blasio shames New York pizza, and Roger Ross Williams discusses "God Loves Uganda."
January 14	Tim Gunn	Under the Gunn
New evidence emerges in Chris Christie's bridge scandal, Brit Hume decries America's feminization, The Fox Five is a love story, and Tim Gunn hosts "Under the Gunn."
January 15	Robert Gates	Gates, Robert Michael (2014). Duty: Memoirs of a Secretary at War. Alfred A. Knopf. ISBN 978-0307959478.
Justin Bieber bothers his neighbors, Congress threatens to nuke a nuclear deal with Iran, and former Defense Secretary Robert Gates discusses his memoir, "Duty."
January 16	Steven Brill	N/A
Women breach the glass ceiling, Utah and Oklahoma grapple with marriage equality, and Steven Brill weighs in on unreasonably high health care costs.
January 20	Marilynne Roach	N/A
President Barack Obama imposes self-enforced guidelines on secret government surveillance, bacon shortages haunt the Super Bowl, and Marilynne Roach explains the Salem witch trials.
January 21	Theresa Payton	Payton, Theresa; Claypoole, Ted (2014). Privacy in the Age of Big Data: Recognizing Threats, Defending Your Rights, and Protecting Your Family. Rowman & Littlefield. ISBN 978-1442225459.
The 2014 Sochi Homophobic Olympics heats up, Jason Jones deals with untreated PTSD symptoms, and Theresa Payton talks "Privacy in the Age of Big Data."
January 22	Hari Sreenivasan	N/A
Bob McDonnell fails to heed his own financial advice, the Christie administration runs afoul of Hoboken's mayor, and Hari Sreenivasan discusses the art of real news.
January 23	Anjan Sundaram	Sundaram, Anjan (2014). Stringer: A Reporter's Journey in the Congo. Doubleday. ISBN 978-0385537759.
A Syrian peace conference erupts in a word war, the world's billionaires descend on Davos to fight income inequality, and Anjan Sundaram explains "Stringer."
January 27	Jeff Garlin	The Goldbergs
Andrew Cuomo offends Sean Hannity, Justin Bieber supplants real news, Ted Cruz knows who's to blame for the government shutdown, and Jeff Garlin talks "The Goldbergs."
January 28	Louis C.K.	Tomorrow Night
President Obama updates America on the State of the Union, Sam Bee investigates minimum wage protests, and Louis C.K. reveals details of his film, "Tomorrow Night."
January 29	Johnny Knoxville	Jackass Presents: Bad Grandpa
President Obama of ends sensitive Republican souls by abandoning bipartisanship in his State of the Union, and Johnny Knoxville talks "Bad Grandpa."
January 30	Nancy Pelosi	N/A
Atlanta shuts down following a massive two-inch blizzard, Justin Bieber and Rob Ford keep Canada in the news, and Nancy Pelosi talks government inefficiencies.

=== February ===
Original air date	Guest(s)	Promotion
February 3	Bill de Blasio	N/A
The Best F#@king News Team Ever surveys New York's winter snowscape, Chris Christie employs high school tactics, and Bill de Blasio addresses the pizza controversy.
February 4	Elizabeth Banks	The Lego Movie
Bill O'Reilly interviews President Barack Obama before the Super Bowl, China's lunar rover says goodbye, and Elizabeth Banks talks "The Lego Movie."
February 5	George Clooney	The Monuments Men
Al Qaeda fights an insurgency within its insurgency, Jason Jones investigates conservative Super PAC spending in Iowa, and George Clooney talks "The Monuments Men."
February 6	Robyn Doolittle	Doolittle, Robyn (2014). Crazy Town: The Rob Ford Story. Viking. ISBN 978-0-6700-6811-1.
Fox News trumpets the CBO report's imaginary condemnation of Obamacare, Coca-Cola upsets American America, and Robyn Doolittle reveals the real Rob Ford.
February 10	Ty Burrell	Mr. Peabody & Sherman
Jason Jones kicks off the Sochi Olympics in Moscow, an NFL prospect comes out as gay, and "Mr. Peabody & Sherman" star Ty Burrell reflects on working with Stephen Colbert.
February 11	Elizabeth Kolbert	Kolbert, Elizabeth (11 February 2014). The Sixth Extinction: An Unnatural History. Macmillan. ISBN 978-0-8050-9299-8.
The Daily Show fills in for Bob Costas at the Olympics, François Hollande breaches state dinner etiquette, and Elizabeth Kolbert discusses "The Sixth Extinction."
February 12	Joel Kinnaman	RoboCop
Jason Jones takes the pulse of gay Russia, Democrats prove they're not immune to political corruption, and Joel Kinnaman talks "RoboCop."
February 18	Kevin Spacey	House of Cards
Another Florida man stands his ground against an unarmed black teenager, Republicans fight capitalism, and Kevin Spacey reveals the politics behind "House of Cards."
February 19	David O. Russell	American Hustle
The Obama administration gets philosophical on drone policy, Jason Jones discovers an unlikely conservative wonderland, and David O. Russell talks "American Hustle."
February 20	Ronan Farrow	Ronan Farrow Daily
Kansas Child-Hitting Law, Missouri Creationism Law, Food Recalls at Subway, Kraft and Hot Pockets, Ronan Farrow, "Ronan Farrow Daily"
February 24	Hooman Majd	The Ministry of Guidance Invites You to Not Stay: An American Family in Iran. ISBN 978-1-4526-6695-2.
The Sochi Games come to a close, Jason Jones discovers an important Russian adage, Larry Wilmore defends Lincoln, and Hooman Majd talks about life in Iran.
February 25	Michio Kaku	Kaku, Michio (2014). The Future of the Mind. Doubleday. ISBN 978-0-3855-3082-8.
Ukrainians depose President Viktor Yanukovych, Mexican police apprehend a notorious drug lord, and physicist Michio Kaku talks "The Future of the Mind."
February 26	Liam Neeson	Non-Stop
Arizona preemptively fends off the gay agenda, Chuck Hagel announces cuts to American military spending, and Liam Neeson explains his beef with Bill de Blasio.
February 27	Kevin Roose	Roose, Kevin (2014). Young Money: Inside the Hidden World of Wall Street's Post-Crash Recruits. Grand Central. ISBN 978-0-4465-8325-1.
The corruption of financial institutions is revealed, Al Madrigal explains some problems with Medicaid expansion, and Kevin Roose reflects on morose young Wall Street bankers.

=== March ===
Original air date	Guest(s)	Promotion
March 3	Seth MacFarlane	MacFarlane, Seth; Sulkin, Alec; Wild, Wellesley (2014). A Million Ways to Die in the West. Ballantine Books. ISBN 978-0-5533-9167-1.
Russian forces threaten to storm Ukrainian bases, Jordan Klepper reports from Crimea, and Seth MacFarlane discusses his Oscars hosting performance and also about his new novel based on his film, A Million Ways to Die in the West.
March 4	Jim DeMint	Demint, Senator Jim (2014). Falling in Love with America Again. Center Street. ISBN 978-1-4555-4980-1.
Fox News fixates on food stamps, Jessica Williams discovers racism in surprising places, and Jim DeMint discusses "Falling in Love with America Again."
March 5	Rachel Maddow	Why We Did It
Senate shamefully rejects a veteran benefits bill, Hamid Karzai criticizes American presence in Afghanistan, and Rachel Maddow revisits the Iraq War in "Why We Did It."
March 6	Kimberly Marten	N/A
Vladimir Putin embraces his own geopolitical propaganda, Aasif Mandvi discovers third world health care in America, and Kimberly Marten discusses the growing Crimean crisis.
March 10	Paul Taylor	Taylor, Paul (4 March 2014). The Next America: Boomers, Millennials, and the Looming Generational Showdown. Pew Research Center. ISBN 978-1-6103-9350-8.
Conservatives search for a presidential hopeful at CPAC, Pope Francis' papacy turns one, and Paul Taylor discusses millennials in his book "The Next America."
March 11	Andrew Napolitano	Napolitano, Andrew P. (12 November 2012). Theodore and Woodrow: How Two American Presidents Destroyed Constitutional Freedom. HarperChristian + ORM. ISBN 978-1595554215.
Crimea Is Lost, Vladimir Putin's Body Language, Andrew Napolitano, "Theodore and Woodrow", "The Weakest Lincoln".
March 12	Jason Bateman	Bad Words
Jordan Klepper denies CIA interference in the Senate's torture investigation, Samantha Bee discovers Medicare covers penis pumps, and Jason Bateman learns Yiddish.
March 13	Anita Hill	Anita
Fox News gives some math lessons on welfare spending, Mitch McConnell's campaign gives rise to the game #McConnelling, and Anita Hill is the subject of a new documentary.
March 24	Arianna Huffington	Huffington, Arianna (2014). Thrive: The Third Metric to Redefining Success and Creating a Life of Well-Being, Wisdom, and Wonder. Harmony/Rodale. ISBN 978-0-8041-4084-3.
Malaysia Airlines Flight 370 disappears mysteriously, Surgeon General nominee Dr. Vivek Murthy faces opposition, and Arianna Huffington redefines success in Thrive.
March 25	Amy Yates Wuelfing & Gibby Haynes	Wuelfing, Amy Yates; Dilodovico, Steven (2014). No Slam Dancing, No Stage Diving, No Spikes. DiWulf. ISBN 978-0-9913-4470-3.
Russia annexes Crimea despite international scorn, the Mitch McConnell game continues with #meconnelling, and Amy Yates Wuelfing and Gibby Haynes fondly remember City Gardens.
March 26	Jude Law	Dom Hemingway
Jordan Klepper promotes biblical health care, Samantha Bee finds family with the cast of Morning Joe, and Jude Law discusses getting into character for Dom Hemingway.
March 27	Nate Silver	FiveThirtyEight.com
Kristen Schaal offers marriage advice to young women, Aasif Mandvi investigates the impacts of fracking, and Nate Silver discusses his website FiveThirtyEight.com.
March 31	Peter Dinklage	Game of Thrones
Governor Chris Christie's own investigation exonerates him, corruption scandals emerge nationwide, and Peter Dinklage shares his admiration for a Croatian security guard.

=== April ===
Original air date	Guest(s)	Promotion
April 1	Michael Lewis	Lewis, Michael (31 March 2014). Flash Boys: A Wall Street Revolt. W. W. Norton & Company. ISBN 978-0-3932-4466-3.
CNN desperately struggles to fill its news cycle with Flight 370 developments, and Michael Lewis discusses the rigged Wall Street system detailed in his book "Flash Boys."
April 2	Samuel L. Jackson	Captain America: The Winter Soldier
General Motors takes its sweet time recalling a deadly part, John Hodgman gets into offshore banking, and Samuel L. Jackson shares how cool it is to film action movies.
April 3	Pelé	Pelé; Winter, Brian (2014). Why Soccer Matters. Penguin. ISBN 978-0-4514-6844-4.
Aasif Mandvi reports on a Supreme Court ruling that gives wealthy Americans a stronger voice in politics, and Pele shares highlights from his remarkable soccer career.
April 7	Matt Taibbi	Taibbi, Matt (2014). The Divide: American Injustice in the Age of the Wealth Gap. Spiegel & Grau. ISBN 978-0-8129-9342-4.
The leaders of the Bush administration defend their legacy, Afghan voters overcome immense obstacles, and author Matt Taibbi talks justice and the wealth gap in "The Divide."
April 8	Denis Leary	Draft Day
Al Madrigal tackles the liberal Latino media bias regarding Obamacare, "Noah" disappoints certain moviegoers, and Denis Leary shares his hairstyle choices for "Draft Day."
April 9	Colin Firth	The Railway Man
Samantha Bee fears that Putin is plotting to invade Brooklyn, Fox News covers spring break festivities, and Colin Firth discusses his role in "The Railway Man."
April 10	Jennifer Garner	Draft Day
Stephen Colbert makes an exciting career move, college athletes struggle to unionize, and Jennifer Garner shares Kevin Costner's off-set activities while filming "Draft Day."
April 21	Gina McCarthy	N/A
Cliven Bundy fights for his lawless ranching practices, Putin is questioned about Russia's involvement in Ukraine, and Gina McCarthy discusses being EPA administrator.
April 22	Elizabeth Warren	Warren, Elizabeth (22 April 2014). A Fighting Chance. Macmillan. ISBN 978-1627790529.
Women in politics continue to face sexist double standards, and Senator Elizabeth Warren discusses "A Fighting Chance" and the need for political reform.
April 23	Robin Roberts	Roberts, Robin; Chambers, Veronica (2014). Everybody's Got Something. Grand Central. ISBN 978-1-4555-7845-0.
Sean Hannity contradicts his own beliefs, Stephen Colbert reveals his plans for the future, and Robin Roberts shares her struggles with breast cancer.
April 24	Ramachandra Guha	Guha, Ramachandra (3 February 2015). Gandhi Before India. Knopf Doubleday Publishing. ISBN 978-0-3074-7478-0.
Cliven Bundy's racist remarks; CNN continues obsession with Malaysia flight 370; Will & Kate tour Australia; John Oliver promotes his new show on HBO
April 28	Mookie Wilson	Wilson, Mookie; Sherman, Erik (March 2015). Mookie: Life, Baseball, and the '86 Mets. Penguin Publishing. ISBN 978-0425271339.
Diverse forms of still-thriving racism hit the media, Larry Wilmore explains how to tackle racism in America, and Mookie Wilson discusses loyalty amongst sports champions.
April 29	William D. Cohan	The Price of Silence: The Duke Lacrosse Scandal, the Power of the Elite, and the Corruption of Our Great Universities. ISBN 978-1-4516-8180-2.
Sarah Palin gives a speech at the NRA convention, Jordan Klepper reports on low-cost legal aid for gun users, and William D. Cohan discusses the Duke lacrosse scandal.
April 30	Martin Gilens & Benjamin Page	Testing Theories of American Politics: Elites, Interest Groups, and Average Citizens
Controversies hit several government agencies, Rep. Michael Grimm faces fraud charges, and Martin Gilens and Benjamin Page take an empirical look at politics and corruption.

=== May ===
Original air date	Guest(s)	Promotion
May 1	David Spade	Comedy Central Special David Spade: My Fake Problems
Bill O'Reilly complains about Beyonce's sexiness, crack-smoking Toronto Mayor Rob Ford checks into rehab, and David Spade reminds himself that he does stand-up.
May 5	Mariano Rivera	Rivera, Mariano (2014). The Closer. Little, Brown. ISBN 978-0-3164-0073-2.
News about the Benghazi investigation sparks outrage from Fox News, Jordan Klepper covers the South Carolina primaries, and Mariano Rivera discusses his baseball career.
May 6	Peter Schuck	Schuck, Peter H. (2014). Why Government Fails So Often: And How It Can Do Better. ISBN 978-0-6911-6162-4.
Samantha Bee defends the real victims of the financial crisis, lesbians face discrimination during major life events, and Peter Schuck describes effective public policy.
May 7	Seth Rogen	Neighbors
Rumors about 2016 presidential hopefuls start circulating, Jordan Klepper reports on the disastrous effects of a chemical spill, and Seth Rogen talks about "Neighbors."
May 8	Katie Couric	Fed Up
The New York Senate engages in a spirited debate about yogurt, John Hodgman looks to acquire the Los Angeles Clippers, and Katie Couric discusses the obesity epidemic.
May 12	Martin Blaser	Blaser, Martin J. (8 April 2014). Missing Microbes: How the Overuse of Antibiotics Is Fueling Our Modern Plagues. ISBN 978-0-8050-9810-5.
Boko Haram abducts hundreds of Nigerian schoolgirls, Donald Sterling apologizes for his racist remarks, and Martin Blaser warns against the overuse of antibiotics.
May 13	Ron Suskind	Life, Animated: A Story of Sidekicks, Heroes, and Autism. Hyperion Books. 2014. ISBN 978-1-4231-8036-4.
Harry Reid takes on the Koch brothers, Hillary Clinton's health scare inspires a #Brainghazi conspiracy, and "Life, Animated" author Ron Suskind talks about autism.
May 14	Blondie	N/A
The media searches for the reason why Solange Knowles attacked Jay-Z in an elevator, Lewis Black considers cloning himself, and Blondie celebrates their 40th anniversary.
May 15	Jim Parsons	The Normal Heart
India holds elections for prime minister, aging incumbents continue to run for Congress, and Jim Parsons discusses AIDS activism and "The Normal Heart."
May 19	James McAvoy	X-Men: Days of Future Past
The V.A. continues to mismanage veterans' health care, Jason Jones compares democracy in India and America, and James McAvoy chats about "X-Men: Days of Future Past."
May 20	Aneesh Chopra	N/A
Chipotle bans guns in its restaurants, Phillies manager Ryne Sandberg eats a bad burger at a Mets game, and Aneesh Chopra discusses technology in government.
May 21	Timothy Geithner	Geithner, Timothy F. (2014). Stress Test: Reflections on Financial Crises. ISBN 978-0-8041-3859-8.
Mitch McConnell defeats the Tea Party in Kentucky's Republican primary, Jason Jones explores India's media, and Timothy Geithner defends the handling of the financial crisis.
May 22	Drew Barrymore	Blended
America upholds a long tradition of mistreating its veterans, Jason Jones attempts to interview India's new prime minister, and Drew Barrymore talks about filming "Blended."

=== June ===
Original air date	Guest(s)	Promotion
June 2	Robert De Niro	Remembering the Artist: Robert De Niro, Sr.
Egypt's popular satirical news show ends abruptly, Samantha Bee discovers a dangerous epidemic of stupidity, and Robert De Niro remembers his father's artwork.
June 3	Ricky Gervais	Derek
Controversy quickly shatters the happy news of a POWs return home, Herman Cain considers the presidential race, and Ricky Gervais shares his conditions for an ideal death.
June 4	Gihan Ibrahim	N/A
Michael Che joins the Best F#@king News Team Ever, Republicans hold steadfast to their myopic views, and Gigi Ibrahim discusses the revolutionary movement in Egypt.
June 5	Tom Cruise	Edge of Tomorrow
Gun rights activists in Texas start carrying rifles in public, Michael Che and Jordan Klepper give tips on proper gun etiquette, and Tom Cruise chats about "Edge of Tomorrow."
June 9	Philip K. Howard	Howard, Philip K. (2014). The Rule of Nobody: Saving America from Dead Laws and Broken Government. WW Norton. ISBN 978-0-3930-8282-1.
Fox News gets worked up over a beard, Jason Jones and Jessica Williams report on the Bowe Bergdahl controversy, and Philip K. Howard discusses government paralysis.
June 10	Sebastian Junger	Korengal
Congress scrutinizes the V.A. for its ongoing failures, Jordan Klepper investigates how unionizing would affect college athletes, and Sebastian Junger discusses "Korengal."
June 11	Charles Schumer	N/A
Eric Cantor loses his primary election in a surprising upset, a Connecticut boy accidentally brings a grenade to school, and Charles Schumer shares some news from Washington.
June 12	Christopher Walken	Jersey Boys
The militant group ISIS overruns much of Iraq, Jason Jones delves into the world of Google Glass users, and Christopher Walken discusses "Jersey Boys."
June 16	Howard Schultz	N/A
Iraq War supporters go on a reunion tour, America has conflicting feelings about Iran and Saudi Arabia, and Howard Schultz shares some exciting news about Starbucks.
June 17	Daniel Schulman	Schulman, Daniel (2014). Sons of Wichita: How the Koch Brothers Became America's Most Powerful and Private Dynasty. ISBN 978-1-4555-1873-9.
Texas Republicans try to "cure" gay people with reparative therapy, Donald Trump clashes with Chicago Mayor Rahm Emanuel, and Daniel Schulman discusses "Sons of Wichita."
June 18	Kevin Hart	Think Like a Man Too
CNN and Fox News interview Hillary Clinton on the same day, Al Madrigal investigates chicken boxing, and "Think Like a Man Too" star Kevin Hart talks about hosting "WWE Raw."
June 19	Hamid Al-Bayati	N/A
The U.S. Patent and Trademark Office revokes the Redskins' trademark, Republicans find new ways to deny climate change, and Hamid Al-Bayati discusses the crisis in Iraq.
June 23	Bill Maher	N/A
President Obama sends military advisors to Iraq, an Egyptian court convicts three well-respected journalists, and Bill Maher talks politics and the New York Mets.
June 24	Jennifer Esposito	Esposito, Jennifer (22 April 2014). Jennifer's Way: My Journey with Celiac Disease -- What Doctors Don't Tell You and How You Can Learn to Live Again. Da Capo Press. ISBN 978-0-7382-1710-9.
The IRS struggles with proper recordkeeping, Hillary Clinton and Joe Biden drum up support, and Jennifer Esposito discusses her book, "Jennifer's Way."
June 25	Keira Knightley	Begin Again
Two aging incumbents win re-election, Jordan Klepper and Jessica Williams share campus safety do's and don'ts, and Keira Knightley describes singing in "Begin Again."
June 26	Melissa McCarthy	Tammy
Republicans spout incongruous domestic and foreign policy ideas, Samantha Bee reports on child labor in the U.S., and Melissa McCarthy discusses her film "Tammy."

=== July ===
Original air date	Guest(s)	Promotion
July 14	Dahlia Lithwick	N/A
Numerous global crises emerge during summer vacation, Jessica Williams and Jason Jones report on the Hobby Lobby case, and Dahlia Lithwick discusses the Supreme Court.
July 15	Hillary Clinton	Hard Choices. Simon & Schuster. 2014. ISBN 978-1-4767-5144-3.
Thousands of child immigrants flee to America in search of a better life, and Hillary Clinton talks about "Hard Choices" and her experiences as Secretary of State.
July 16	Jerry Seinfeld	Comedians in Cars Getting Coffee
The federal Highway Trust Fund runs dry, an "anonymous" informant reveals the CIA's cafeteria secrets, and Jerry Seinfeld talks about "Comedians in Cars Getting Coffee."
July 17	Emma Stone	Magic in the Moonlight
Republicans seek to impeach Barack Obama, Jessica Williams investigates an Army regulation that targets black women, and Emma Stone chats about "Magic in the Moonlight."
July 21	Sue Turton	N/A
International tensions escalate after Malaysia Airlines Flight 17 is shot down over Ukraine, and Sue Turton discusses the Egyptian trial of several Al Jazeera journalists.
July 22	Richard Linklater	Boyhood
Rupert Murdoch decides that he wants to own Time Warner, Jordan Klepper interviews the victims of civil forfeiture, and Richard Linklater discusses his film "Boyhood."
July 23	George Takei	To Be Takei
A court ruling deals Obamacare a heavy blow, the summer news cycle needs more scandals and animal attacks, and George Takei discusses the documentary "To Be Takei."
July 24	Fareed Zakaria	N/A
Gov. Andrew Cuomo tackles corruption everywhere but in his own office, a Japanese artist commits an unusual crime, and Fareed Zakaria discusses diplomacy in a changing world.
July 28	Sonia Nazario	Enrique's Journey
A Times Square photo op goes awry, global leaders struggle to broker peace in the Middle East, and Sonia Nazario discusses "Enrique's Journey."
July 29	Sara Firth	N/A
The U.S. buys weapons for several countries in the Middle East, the LetsBuyCNN.com Kickstarter campaign is a success, and Sara Firth discusses her decision to leave RT.
July 30	Maggie Gyllenhaal	The Honourable Woman
Corporations throw tantrums and move to Europe, Jordan Klepper reports on hard-hitting journalism in a digital world, and Maggie Gyllenhaal discusses "The Honorable Woman."
July 31	Aubrey Plaza	Life After Beth
Congress spends the time before summer recess deciding to sue Barack Obama, Jason Jones tries to stop supporting the NFL, and Aubrey Plaza discusses "Life After Beth."

=== August ===
Original air date	Guest(s)	Promotion
August 4	Elisabeth Moss	The One I Love
Numerous global crises emerge during summer vacation, Jessica Williams and Jason Jones report on the Hobby Lobby case, and Dahlia Lithwick discusses the Supreme Court.
August 5	Helen Thorpe	Thorpe, Helen (5 August 2014). Soldier Girls: The Battles of Three Women at Home and at War. Simon and Schuster. ISBN 978-1-4516-6810-0.
Jessica Williams does some dubious reporting, Michael Che reports on a very particular sort of brand-name loyalty, and Helen Thorpe discusses her book "Soldier Girls."
August 6	Wu-Tang Clan	A Better Tomorrow
Republicans battle it out in the Kansas and Kentucky primaries, Jordan Klepper shows off his rap skills, and Wu-Tang Clan performs "Ron O'Neal" and "Triumph."
August 7	Tracy Droz Tragos	Rich Hill
Former Governor Bob McDonnell and his wife face corruption charges, Rand Paul begins to act like a presidential candidate, and Tracy Droz Tragos discusses "Rich Hill."
August 26	David L. Rose	Rose, David (2014). Enchanted Objects: Design, Human Desire, and the Internet of Things. Simon and Schuster. ISBN 978-1-4767-2563-5.
A police officer shoots an unarmed black teenager in Missouri, Michael Che flees Earth to avoid discrimination, and David Rose discusses his book "Enchanted Objects."
August 27	Hassan Abbas	Abbas, Hassan (24 June 2014). The Taliban Revival: Violence and Extremism on the Pakistan-Afghanistan Frontier. Yale University Press. ISBN 978-0-3001-7884-5.
ISIS looks to establish a caliphate, Samantha Bee comes up with ways for Michael Sam to succeed in the NFL, and Hassan Abbas discusses "The Taliban Revival."
August 28	Todd Glass	Glass, Todd (2014). The Todd Glass Situation: A Bunch of Lies about My Personal Life and a Bunch of True Stories about My 30-Year Career in Stand-Up Comedy. Simon and Schuster. ISBN 978-1-4767-1441-7.
Rick Perry is indicted on two felony counts, Jason Jones examines Germany and America's friendship, and Todd Glass discusses his book "The Todd Glass Situation."

=== September ===
Original air date	Guest(s)	Promotion
September 2	Ramita Navai	Navai, Ramita (2 September 2014). City of Lies: Love, Sex, Death, and the Search for Truth in Tehran. PublicAffairs. ISBN 978-1-6103-9519-9.
Jessica Williams addresses a catcaller, former House Majority Leader Eric Cantor finds a new job, and Ramita Navai discusses her book "City of Lies."
September 3	Rory Kennedy	Last Days in Vietnam
Jordan Klepper bares it all in the wake of a hacking scandal, conflict between Russia and Ukraine continues, and Rory Kennedy discusses her documentary "Last Days in Vietnam."
September 4	Adam Levine	V
Campaign ads for the midterm elections roll out, Michael Che investigates a potential children's invasion of the U.S., and Adam Levine discusses Maroon 5's album "V."
September 9	Kirsten Gillibrand	Gillibrand, Kirsten; Weil, Elizabeth (2014). Off the Sidelines: Raise Your Voice, Change the World. Ballantine Books. ISBN 978-0-8041-7907-2.
ISIS inspires an unexpected reunion, and Senator Kirsten Gillibrand describes the struggles women face in her book "Off the Sidelines: Raise Your Voice, Change the World."
September 10	Ban Ki-moon	N/A
The NFL suspends Ray Rice indefinitely, Scotland considers breaking away from the U.K., and U.N. Secretary-General Ban Ki-moon discusses the state of the world.
September 11	Tavis Smiley	Death of a King: The Real Story of Dr. Martin Luther King Jr.'s Final Year. Little Brown & Co. 2014. ISBN 978-0-3163-3276-7.
President Obama delivers a speech about ISIS, Jordan Klepper becomes an Obamacare critic, and Tavis Smiley discusses his book "Death of a King."
September 15	Ken Burns	The Roosevelts: An Intimate History
President Obama gathers a coalition to fight ISIS, Samantha Bee explains Senator Lindsey Graham's paranoia, and Ken Burns discusses "The Roosevelts: An Intimate History."
September 16	Bill Hader	The Skeleton Twins
Hillary Clinton remains secretive about her intentions for 2016, Michael Che takes on the pharmaceutical industry, and Bill Hader discusses his movie "The Skeleton Twins."
September 17	Zephyr Teachout	Teachout, Zephyr (15 September 2014). Corruption in America: From Benjamin Franklin's Snuff Box to Citizens United. Harvard University Press. ISBN 978-0-6740-5040-2.
The NFL struggles with its image after several cases of domestic abuse emerge, Ebola poses a greater threat than ISIS, and Zephyr Teachout discusses "Corruption in America."
September 18	Bill Clinton	Clinton Global Initiative
Joe Biden's word choices jeopardize his election hopes, The Best F#@king News Team Ever says goodbye to Michael Che, and Bill Clinton discusses the Clinton Global Initiative.
September 22	Jenny Nordberg	Nordberg, Jenny (2014). The Underground Girls of Kabul: In Search of a Hidden Resistance in Afghanistan. ISBN 978-0-3079-5249-3.
New York City hosts a historic climate change march, Jason Jones pilfers an outfit from the White House, and Jenny Nordberg discusses "The Underground Girls of Kabul."
September 23	Tony Zinni	Zinni, Tony; Koltz, Tony (2014). Before the First Shots Are Fired: How America Can Win or Lose Off the Battlefield. St. Martin's Press. ISBN 978-1-1372-7938-5.
Jessica Williams reports on the terrorist supergroups seeking to replace ISIS and the Khorasan Group, and General Tony Zinni discusses "Before the First Shots Are Fired."
September 24	Tia Torres	Pit Bulls & Parolees
Samantha Bee runs for election on her home planet, the Chinese company Alibaba debuts on Wall Street, and Tia Torres discusses the sixth season of "Pit Bulls & Parolees."
September 25	Steven Johnson	Johnson, Steven (2014). How We Got to Now: Six Innovations That Made the Modern World. Penguin. ISBN 978-1-5946-3296-9.
The media fixates on President Obama's "latte salute," Jason Jones speaks with activists protesting the Redskins' name, and Steven Johnson discusses "How We Got to Now."
September 29	Hadi al-Bahra	N/A
Congress fails to debate going to war with ISIS, the U.N. Climate Summit draws global leaders, and Hadi al-Bahra discusses the Syrian National Coalition's opposition movement.
September 30	Ben Affleck	Gone Girl
Congress's system for passing laws slows to a halt, Indian Prime Minister Narendra Modi visits the U.S., and Ben Affleck discusses "Gone Girl" and "Batman v Superman."

=== October ===
Original air date	Guest(s)	Promotion
October 1	Lena Dunham	Dunham, Lena (2014). Not That Kind of Girl: A Young Woman Tells You What She's 'Learned'. Random House Publishing. ISBN 978-0-8129-9499-5.
An intruder breaches White House security, the first case of Ebola in the U.S. causes the media to panic, and Lena Dunham discusses her memoir, "Not That Kind of Girl."
October 2	Ben Steele	Hunted: The War Against Gays in Russia
Conservatives panic about ISIS and Ebola, Jessica Williams explores the idea that sexism doesn't exist, and Ben Steele discusses "Hunted: The War Against Gays in Russia."
October 6	Atul Gawande	Gawande, Atul (2014). Being Mortal: Medicine and What Matters in the End. ISBN 978-0-8050-9515-9.
Protests in Hong Kong become more relaxed, Kim Jong-un suffers from a mysterious illness, Jordan Klepper visits the U.N., and Atul Gawande discusses his book "Being Mortal."
October 7	Wyatt Cenac	Wyatt Cenac: Brooklyn
Guest hosted by Jason Jones along with Samantha Bee, as Stewart was out sick. Bill O'Reilly was originally slated to appear to promote Killing Patton: The Strange Death of World War II's Most Audacious General.
October 8	Leon Panetta	Panetta, Leon E.; Newton, Jim (2014). Worthy Fights: A Memoir of Leadership in War and Peace. Penguin. ISBN 978-1-5942-0596-5.
ISIS moves to attack the Syrian border town of Kobani, Kristen Schaal reports on the GOP's campaign targeting female voters, and Leon Panetta discusses "Worthy Fights."
October 9	Jeremy Renner	Kill the Messenger
AIG's former CEO sues the U.S. government, Al Madrigal reports on Republicans' sudden interest in LGBT voters, and Jeremy Renner discusses his film "Kill the Messenger."
October 13	Matt Bai	Bai, Matt (2014). All the Truth Is Out: The Week Politics Went Tabloid. Alfred A. Knopf. ISBN 978-0-3072-7338-3.
Democrats display unparalleled persistence in campaign fundraising, Jessica Williams reports on modern-day exorcisms, and Matt Bai discusses "All the Truth Is Out."
October 14	Zach Galifianakis	Birdman
A health worker in Texas contracts Ebola, Staten Island's midterm election race comes down to two lackluster candidates, and Zach Galifianakis discusses his film "Birdman."
October 15	Bill O'Reilly	O'Reilly, Bill; Dugard, Martin (23 September 2014). Killing Patton: The Strange Death of World War II's Most Audacious General. Henry Holt and Company. ISBN 978-0-8050-9668-2.
Candidates square off in the midterm election debates, the coalition against ISIS encounters unexpected obstacles, and Bill O'Reilly discusses white privilege.
October 16	Bryan Stevenson	Stevenson, Bryan (21 October 2014). Just Mercy: A Story of Justice and Redemption. Random House Publishing. ISBN 978-0-8129-9452-0.
Florida gubernatorial candidate Charlie Crist cools his balls, Jessica Williams reports on Kansas's conservative utopia, and Bryan Stevenson discusses his book "Just Mercy."
October 27	Wendy Davis	Davis, Wendy (2014). Forgetting to Be Afraid: A Memoir. Blue Rider Press, a member of Penguin Group (USA). ISBN 978-0-3991-7057-7.
The Best F#@king News Team Ever heads to Austin, Texas, for the midterms, a doctor in New York City contracts Ebola, and Wendy Davis discusses "Forgetting to Be Afraid."
October 28	Joaquin Castro	N/A
Democrats' prospects in the midterms grow dire, Jason Jones reports on the key political issues in Texas, and Rep. Joaquin Castro describes a difficult year in Congress.
October 29	Ellar Coltrane	Boyhood
The Best F#@king News Team Ever reports on the immigration crisis in Texas, a Koch Brothers' advertisement gets some apt alterations, and Ellar Coltrane discusses "Boyhood."
October 30	Spoon	They Want My Soul
Texas Democrats are in denial about the blueness of their state, Samantha Bee investigates what makes Austin weird, and Spoon performs from their album "They Want My Soul."

=== November ===
Original air date	Guest(s)	Promotion
November 3	Jake Gyllenhaal	Nightcrawler
Republicans surge ahead in the midterm election polls, Connecticut gubernatorial candidate Tom Foley defends his boat's name, and Jake Gyllenhaal discusses "Nightcrawler."
November 4	Reince Priebus	N/A
Republicans sweep the midterms, The Best F#@king News Team Ever offers expert election coverage, and RNC Chairman Reince Priebus celebrates his party's victory.
November 5	John Cleese	Cleese, John (2014). So Anyway... Crown Archetype. ISBN 978-0-3853-4824-9.
Jordan Klepper and Jessica Williams report on the Republicans' sweeping victory in the midterm elections, and John Cleese discusses his memoir, "So, Anyway..."
November 6	James Risen	Risen, James (2014). Pay Any Price: Greed, Power, and Endless War. Houghton Mifflin Harcourt. ISBN 978-0-5443-4141-8.
President Barack Obama and Republicans attempt to work together, Democrats intentionally avoid making legislative decisions, and James Risen discusses "Pay Any Price."
November 10	Bruce Springsteen & Frank Caruso	Springsteen, Bruce (4 November 2014). Outlaw Pete. Simon and Schuster. ISBN 978-1501103858.
President Obama increases the military presence in Iraq, Jordan Klepper examines police sensitivity training, and Bruce Springsteen and Frank Caruso discuss "Outlaw Pete."
November 11	Samantha Power	N/A
New York City is declared Ebola-free, China hosts the APEC summit, and U.N. Ambassador Samantha Power discusses the international efforts to combat Ebola and ISIS.
November 12	Steve Carell	Foxcatcher
Poaching threatens elephants and funds terrorists, police accuse Minneapolis Mayor Betsy Hodges of flashing a gang sign, and Steve Carell discusses his film "Foxcatcher."
November 13	Maziar Bahari & Gael García Bernal	Rosewater
Not feeling comfortable hyping his own film, after a brief introduction Jon Stewart turned hosting duties over to John Oliver.
November 17	Laura Poitras	Citizenfour
President Obama considers an executive order on immigration, Jessica Williams reports on Detroit's water shutoffs, and Laura Poitras discusses her documentary "Citizenfour."
November 18	Benedict Cumberbatch	The Imitation Game
Obamacare faces scrutiny yet again, House Minority Leader Nancy Pelosi demonstrates her political ruthlessness, and Benedict Cumberbatch discusses "The Imitation Game."
November 19	Jessica Chastain	Interstellar
Hasan Minhaj and Jordan Klepper debate the use of gestation crates, Lewis Black investigates Black Friday's impact on laborers, and Jessica Chastain discusses "Interstellar."
November 20	Eddie Redmayne	The Theory of Everything
The Keystone XL pipeline bill fails for the time being, Republicans oppose eminent domain at least in theory, and Eddie Redmayne discusses "The Theory of Everything."

=== December ===
Original air date	Guest(s)	Promotion
December 1	Andrew Napolitano	Napolitano, Andrew P. (2014). Suicide Pact: The Radical Expansion of Presidential Powers and the Lethal Threat to American Liberty. Thomas Nelson. ISBN 978-0-7180-2193-1.
Civil rights protests erupt across the U.S., Governor Chris Christie vetoes a bill to ban pig gestation crates, and Judge Andrew Napolitano discusses his book "Suicide Pact."
December 2	Sophie Delaunay	Doctors Without Borders
The St. Louis Rams clash with local police, Larry Wilmore talks about the Ferguson protests, China bans puns, and Sophie Delaunay discusses Doctors Without Borders.
December 3	Dave Grohl	Foo Fighters: Sonic Highways
The NYPD officer whose chokehold led to Eric Garner's death is not indicted, Samantha Bee reports on pinkwashing, and Dave Grohl discusses "Foo Fighters: Sonic Highways."
December 4	Angelina Jolie	Unbroken
The Eric Garner decision elicits any number of explanations except racism, Trevor Noah joins The Best F#@king News Team Ever, and Angelina Jolie discusses "Unbroken."
December 8	Norman Lear	Lear, Norman (2014). Even This I Get to Experience. Penguin. ISBN 978-1-594-20572-9.
Congress works together to prevent Nazis from receiving Social Security benefits, and Norman Lear discusses his memoir, "Even This I Get to Experience."
December 9	Kathryn Bigelow & Juan Zarate	Last Days
The Senate releases its report on CIA torture, Jordan Klepper investigates a discriminatory restaurant, and Kathryn Bigelow and Juan Zarate discuss their PSA "Last Days."
December 10	Suki Kim	Without You, There Is No Us: My Time with the Sons of North Korea's Elite
Proponents of the CIA's torture program try to justify it, Hasan Minhaj defends America's awesomeness, and Suki Kim discusses her memoir, "Without You, There Is No Us."
December 11	Mick Foley	I Am Santa Claus
The royal family visits New York City, millennials get more than they bargained for when they join ISIS, and Mick Foley discusses his documentary "I Am Santa Claus."
December 15	Tim Burton	Big Eyes
Dick Cheney defends the CIA's torture program, Jordan Klepper visits Swedish Prime Minister Stefan Lofven for governing advice, and Tim Burton discusses his film "Big Eyes."
December 16	Paul McCartney	Hope for the Future
Congress passes a budget bill that's full of surprises, Aasif Mandvi reports on a suggestive South Dakotan PSA, and Paul McCartney discusses his song "Hope for the Future."
December 17	Anna Kendrick	Into the Woods
LeBron James and Andrew Hawkins join the police brutality protests, Jessica Williams defends Jay Z's reputation, and Anna Kendrick discusses her film "Into the Woods."
December 18	Chris Rock	Top Five
Sony decides not to release "The Interview," the U.S. and Cuba begin to rebuild their relationship, Jordan Klepper reports on SantaCon, and Chris Rock discusses "Top Five." This episode ends with Jon Stewart checking in with Stephen Colbert (a discontinued practice used in earlier years of the show's run) before the final episode of The Colbert Report. Colbert does not acknowledge it being the final episode at first, but then immediately starts The Colbert Report, ending The Daily Show abruptly without closing credits.
