= Kellie Lim =

American physician

Kellie Lim, a triple amputee due to bacterial meningitis at age 8, graduated near the top of her class at UCLA medical school in 2007 after having been given only a 15% chance of survival. Lim was born in Michigan and raised by her blind mother, Sandy Lim, in Detroit. She cites her experience as an ill child as the reason she chose to become a pediatrician. She does not use a prosthetic arm, and performs most medical procedures with just one arm. She uses prosthetic legs to walk.

The story of Lim's graduation was covered by news outlets throughout the United States and she was also honored by ABC as Person of the Week in June 2007. Prior to attending UCLA, she attended Northwestern University in Evanston, Illinois where she was an advocate for students with disabilities.
