= Baldwin Senior High School (Michigan) =

Location
- 525 4th Street; Baldwin, Michigan 49304; United States
- Coordinates: 43°53′19″N 85°51′22″W

Information
- School district: Baldwin Community Schools
- Superintendent: Richard Heitmeyer
- Principal: Garth Cornwell
- Teaching staff: 18.42 (on a FTE basis)
- Enrollment: 128 (2023-2024)
- Student to teacher ratio: 6.95
- Colors: Blue and Gold
- Athletics conference: West Michigan 'D' League
- Nickname: Panthers
- Website: www.baldwin.k12.mi.us/Baldwin%20High%20School.aspx

Baldwin Senior High School is a 9-12 secondary school in Baldwin, Michigan.

== Academics ==
The Baldwin community has created the "Baldwin Promise" that provides full tuition for graduates to attend college in Michigan. The Baldwin Promise program is the subject of an Upstanders film.

== Demographics ==
The demographic breakdown of the 148 students enrolled in 2014-15 was:

- Male - 55%
- Female - 45%
- Native American/Alaskan - 2%
- Asian/Pacific Islanders - 0%
- Black - 34%
- Hispanic - 3%
- White - 55%
- Multiracial - 6%

94% of the students were eligible for free or reduced lunch.

== Athletics ==
Baldwin's Panthers compete in the West Michigan 'D' League. The school colors are blue and gold. The following MHSAA sanctioned sports are offered:

- Baseball (boys)
- Basketball (girls and boys)
- Bowling (girls and boys)
- Cross country (girls and boys)
- Football (boys)
- Softball (girls)
- Track and field (girls and boys)
- Volleyball (girls)
