= New York primary, 2016 =

New York primary, 2016 may refer to:

- New York Democratic primary, 2016
- New York Republican primary, 2016
