= Upstanders (2016 series) =

Short film series created by Starbucks

Upstanders is a "content series" created by Starbucks and announced by Starbucks chairman Howard Schultz in September 2016. It is a series of 5-6 minute films that, per Starbucks, focus on "ordinary people doing extraordinary things to create positive change in their communities." TechCrunch described it as "stories of compassion, citizenship and civility". The digital video content is distributed on the Starbucks website and mobile app, as well as on YouTube.

It is produced by Howard Schultz and Rajiv Chandrasekaran, formerly of The Washington Post. Chandrasekaran commented that his goal was for the series to be of quality that could be posted by the Washington Post.

The Chicago Tribune commented that it was a venture into content creation, and that Starbucks reported they had been offered considerable sums by media companies for the content to support advertising. While the content is not about Starbucks itself, Starbucks intends for the series to enhance readers' associations about Starbucks.

Music for the series was scored by Jim Greer, a composer known for his work as a record producer with Foster the People, Galactic, Macy Gray, and has also scored numerous films and placed music in many television shows.

As of September 2017, it is a ten episode series. The episodes are:

1. "Scholarships for Every Student" (5:26 minutes:seconds long) about a grass-roots program for Baldwin High School students of Baldwin, Michigan
2. "A Warrior's Workout" (6:09), about wounded veterans
3. "The Hunger Hack" (5:50), about Means, an app that facilitates donations of food to food pantries
4. "The Mosque Across the Street" (5:10)
5. "Breaking the Prison Pipeline" (4:31)
6. "Employing the Full Spectrum" (6:18)
7. "The Kids Who Killed an Incinerator" (5:42)
8. "The Empathetic Police Academy" (5:21)
9. "Homes for Everyone" (5:14)
10. "Building Homes. Building Lives." (5:27)

== Terminology ==
Usage of the term "upstanders" here seems to convey positiveness, as in "upstanding" citizens, while elsewhere the term has been used to connote "standing up" to bullies.

== See also ==
- The Enough Moment, by Don Cheadle, which features celebrity "Upstanders"
- ABC Person of the Week, which since 1989 has frequently featured ordinary persons doing extraordinary things, in 3-4 minute features
- Horace Mann Upstanders Award, of Antioch University Los Angeles
