= Trumped Up Cards =

Card game

- Designers: Reid Hoffman
- Publication: September 2016
- Years active: 18+
- Genres: Party game
- Players: 4-8
- Website: https://trumpedupcards.com

Trumped Up Cards is a party game developed by Reid Hoffman to poke fun at then presidential candidate Donald Trump. It was modeled after the popular Cards Against Humanity card game and sold online. The game was featured on an episode of The Daily Show with Trevor Noah in which Hoffman was a guest. The game has also been covered by a large number of mainstream media outlets, including The New York Times and USA Today. The game is licensed under a Creative Commons Attribution-NonCommercial-ShareAlike 4.0 International License.
