= List of The Daily Show episodes =

The Daily Show is an American late-night satirical television program that airs Monday through Thursday on Comedy Central in the United States. It originally premiered on July 21, 1996, and is currently the longest-running series original program on Comedy Central.

The Daily Show was initially te hosted by Craig Kilborn until December 17, 1998. Jon Stewart took over as host from January 11, 1999 until August 6, 2015. Stewart was succeeded by, Trevor Noah, whose tenure premiered on September 28, 2015 and ended in 2022. The show has also utilized various guest hosts periodically throughout its run. On February 12, 2024, Stewart returned as a host for the Monday night episodes with the correspondents hosting the other days of the week.

During Stewart's tenure the show became more strongly focused on politics and the national media, in contrast with the popular culture focus during Kilborn's tenure. Describing itself as a fake news program, The Daily Show draws its comedy and satire from recent news stories, political figures, media organizations, and often, aspects of the show itself. The show typically opens with a long monologue relating to recent headlines and frequently features exchanges with one or more of several correspondents, who adopt absurd or humorously exaggerated takes on current events against the host's straight man persona. The final segment is devoted to a celebrity interview, with guests ranging from actors and musicians to nonfiction authors and political figures.

== Episodes ==
=== Craig Kilborn's tenure (1996–98) ===
- List of The Daily Show episodes (1996)
- List of The Daily Show episodes (1997)
- List of The Daily Show episodes (1998)

=== Jon Stewart's tenure (1999–2015) ===
- List of The Daily Show episodes (1999)
- List of The Daily Show episodes (2000)
- List of The Daily Show episodes (2001)
- List of The Daily Show episodes (2002)
- List of The Daily Show episodes (2003)
- List of The Daily Show episodes (2004)
- List of The Daily Show episodes (2005)
- List of The Daily Show episodes (2006)
- List of The Daily Show episodes (2007)
- List of The Daily Show episodes (2008)
- List of The Daily Show episodes (2009)
- List of The Daily Show episodes (2010)
- List of The Daily Show episodes (2011)
- List of The Daily Show episodes (2012)
- List of The Daily Show episodes (2013)
- List of The Daily Show episodes (2014)
- List of The Daily Show episodes (2015)

=== Trevor Noah's tenure (2015–22) ===
- List of The Daily Show episodes (2015)
- List of The Daily Show episodes (2016)
- List of The Daily Show episodes (2017)
- List of The Daily Show episodes (2018)
- List of The Daily Show episodes (2019)
- List of The Daily Show episodes (2020)
- List of The Daily Show episodes (2021)
- List of The Daily Show episodes (2022)

=== Guest hosts' tenure (2023) ===
- List of The Daily Show episodes (2023)

=== Jon Stewart and the News Team's tenure (2024–present) ===
- List of The Daily Show episodes (2024)
- List of The Daily Show episodes (2025)
- List of The Daily Show episodes (2026)
