= List of The Daily Show episodes (2002) =

- No. of episodes: 161

Release
- Original network: Comedy Central

Season chronology
- ← Previous; 2001 episodes Next → 2003 episodes

This is a list of episodes for The Daily Show with Jon Stewart in 2002.

== 2002 ==
=== January ===
Number	Date	Guest	Promotion
869	January 8	Anjelica Huston	The Royal Tenenbaums
870	January 9	Luke Wilson	The Royal Tenenbaums
871	January 10	Jack Black	Orange County
872	January 14	Lesley Stahl	
873	January 15	Ian McKellen	The Lord of the Rings: The Fellowship of the Ring
874	January 16	Colin Hanks	Orange County
875	January 17	Jeremy Northam	
876	January 21	Al Sharpton	
877	January 22	Anthony LaPaglia	
878	January 23	Harold Ramis	Orange County
879	January 24	Sebastian Junger	
880	January 28	Ron Insana	
881	January 29	Elmore Leonard	
882	January 30	John King	
883	January 31	Jason Schwartzman	Slackers

=== February ===
Number	Date	Guest	Promotion
884	February 4	Ron Howard	A Beautiful Mind
885	February 5	Greta Van Susteren	500TH Jon Stewart Episode
886	February 6	LL Cool J	Rollerball
887	February 7	Barry Manilow	None
888	February 11	Scott Bakula	
889	February 12	John Stossel	
890	February 13	Ralph Nader	
891	February 14	Rebecca Romijn	Rollerball
892	February 19	Jeri Ryan	
893	February 20	Bethany McLean	
894	February 21	Michael Moore	

=== March ===
Number	Date	Guest	Promotion
895	March 4	David Remnick	
896	March 5†	Richard Lewis	
897	March 6†	Milla Jovovich	Resident Evil
898	March 7†	Tom Arnold	
899	March 11	Bea Arthur	
900	March 12	Denis Leary	
901	March 13	Joe Klein	
902	March 14	Bill O'Reilly	
903	March 18	Andy Richter	
904	March 19	John McCain	
905	March 20	John Leguizamo	Ice Age
906	March 21	Aidan Quinn	

=== April ===
Number	Date	Guest	Promotion
907	April 1	Paula Zahn	
908	April 2	David Brock	
909	April 3	Jon Favreau	
910	April 4	Ashley Judd	High Crimes
911	April 8	Tony Danza	
912	April 9	Judy Woodruff	
913	April 10	Patricia Arquette	
914	April 11	The Goo Goo Dolls	
915	April 15	Samuel L. Jackson	Changing Lanes
916	April 16	Lisa Beyer	
917	April 17	Tara Reid	National Lampoon's Van Wilder
918	April 18	Richard Dreyfuss	
919	April 22	Michael Clarke Duncan	The Scorpion King
920	April 23	Beau Bridges	
921	April 24	Elvis Costello	
922	April 25	H.W. Crocker III	
923	April 29	Susan Caskie	
924	April 30	Alanis Morissette	

=== May ===
Number	Date	Guest	Promotion
925	May 1	Robin Roberts	
926	May 2	Willem Dafoe	Spider-Man
927	May 6	Simon Baker	
928	May 7	Mark Bowden	
929	May 8	Diane Lane	Unfaithful
930	May 9	David Boreanaz	
931	May 13	Moby	18
932	May 14	Liev Schreiber	
933	May 15	Rupert Everett	The Importance of Being Earnest
934	May 16	Allison Janney	
935	May 23	Matt Walsh Goes To Hawaii	(special episode)

=== June ===
Number	Date	Guest	Promotion
936	June 3	Colin Firth	The Importance of Being Earnest
937	June 4	Ashleigh Banfield	
938	June 5	Adam Carolla, Jimmy Kimmel	Crank Yankers
939	June 6	Christopher Whitcomb	
940	June 10	Charles Grodin	
941	June 11	Val Kilmer	
942	June 12	Michael Bloomberg	
943	June 13	Joseph Cirincione	
944	June 17	Freddie Prinze Jr.	Scooby-Doo
945	June 18	Christian Slater	Windtalkers
946	June 19	Cynthia McFadden	
947	June 20	David Cross, Bob Odenkirk	The first two seasons of Mr. Show on DVD
948	June 24	Colin Farrell	Minority Report
949	June 25	David Scheffer	
950	June 26	Paul Sorvino	Hey Arnold!: The Movie
951	June 27	Clint Mathis	None

=== July ===
Number	Date	Guest	Promotion
952	July 8	Adam Sandler	Mr. Deeds
953	July 9	John King	
954	July 10	Busta Rhymes	Halloween: Resurrection
955	July 11	Steve Irwin	The Crocodile Hunter: Collision Course
956	July 15	John Ritter	Tadpole
957	July 16	Michelle Williams	Me Without You
958	July 17	Ann Coulter	Slander: Liberal Lies About the American Right
959	July 18	Natasha Henstridge	She Spies
960	July 22	Regis Philbin	
961	July 23	Tim Blake Nelson	
962	July 24	Steven Weber	The Producers
963	July 25	Seth Green	Austin Powers in Goldmember
964	July 29	Cynthia Nixon	Sex and the City
965	July 30	Robert Wagner	Austin Powers in Goldmember
966	July 31	Martin Lawrence	Martin Lawrence Live: Runteldat

=== August ===
Number	Date	Guest	Promotion
967	August 1	Mike Myers	Austin Powers in Goldmember
968	August 5	Charles Schumer	
969	August 6	Antonio Banderas	Spy Kids 2: Island of Lost Dreams
970	August 7	Vin Diesel	XXX
971	August 8	Paul Rudd	The Château
972	August 12	Michael C. Hall	Six Feet Under, Chicago
973	August 13	Scott Ritter	
974	August 14	Kevin Nealon	The Conspiracy Zone
975	August 15	Rich Eisen	SportsCenter' s 25,000th episode
976	August 19	Denis Leary	Contest Searchlight
977	August 20	Jim Lehrer	
978	August 21	Robin Williams	One Hour Photo
979	August 22	Matthew Perry	Serving Sara

=== September ===
Number	Date	Guest	Promotion
980	September 9	Lorraine Bracco	
981	September 10	Zach Braff	
982	September 12	Sarah Vowell	The Partly Cloudy Patriot
983	September 16	John Miller	
984	September 17	Jason Lee	Stealing Harvard
985	September 18	Damon Wayans	
986	September 19	Djimon Hounsou	
987	September 24	Kate Hudson	The Four Feathers
988	September 25	George Stephanopoulos	
989	September 26	Goldie Hawn	The Banger Sisters
990	September 30	Bonnie Hunt	Life with Bonnie

=== October ===
Number	Date	Guest	Promotion
991	October 1	Patrick Dempsey	Sweet Home Alabama
992	October 2	David Schwimmer	
993	October 3	Rita Wilson	
994	October 7	Jake Gyllenhaal	The Good Girl
995	October 8	Jill Hennessy	
996	October 9	Peter Jennings	
997	October 10	Oliver North	
998	October 14	Road to Washington Special	
999	October 15	Judy Woodruff	
1000	October 16	Richard Lewis	
1001	October 17	Greg Kinnear	
1002	October 28	John Edwards	
1003	October 29	Victoria Clarke	
1004	October 30	Pat Buchanan	
1005	October 31	Ted Koppel	Nightline

=== November ===
Number	Date	Guest	Promotion
1006	November 4	Christina Aguilera	Stripped
1007	November 5	John McCain	None
1008	November 6	Candy Crowley	
1009	November 7	Jakob Dylan	Red Letter Days
1010	November 12	Alexandra Pelosi	
1011	November 13	Kiefer Sutherland	24
1012	November 14	Tom Arnold	
1013	November 18	Ja Rule	Half Past Dead
1014	November 19	Harold Ford	
1015	November 20	Catherine Crier	The Case Against Lawyers
1016	November 21	Kevin James	The King of Queens

=== December ===
Number	Date	Guest	Promotion
1017	December 2	Andy Richter	Andy Richter Controls the Universe
1018	December 3	Katrina vanden Heuvel	The Nation
1019	December 4	Colin Quinn	Tough Crowd with Colin Quinn
1020	December 5	Rob Schneider	The Hot Chick
1021	December 9	Al Gore	
1022	December 10	Tom Brokaw	
1023	December 11	Sandra Bullock	Two Weeks Notice
1024	December 12	Anna Paquin	25th Hour
1025	December 16	Charles Schumer	
1026	December 17	Charles Barkley	I May Be Wrong but I Doubt It
1027	December 18	Edward Norton	25th Hour
1028	December 19	John Cusack	Max

† These episodes were hosted by Stephen Colbert.
