= List of The Daily Show episodes (2000) =

- No. of episodes: 166

Release
- Original network: Comedy Central

Season chronology
- ← Previous; 1999 episodes Next → 2001 episodes

This is a list of episodes for The Daily Show with Jon Stewart in 2000.

== 2000 ==
=== January ===
No.	Date	Guest	Promotion
547	January 4	Cynthia Nixon	Sex and the City
548	January 5	Robbie Williams	The Ego Has Landed
549	January 6	Richard Belzer	Law & Order: Special Victims Unit
550	January 10	Joe Montana	Red Zone
551	January 11	Will Ferrell	Saturday Night Live
552	January 12	Ice Cube	Next Friday
553	January 13	Michael Stipe	Man on the Moon
554	January 17	Penelope Ann Miller	All-American Girl
555	January 18	Frankie Muniz	Malcolm in the Middle
556	January 19	Freddie Prinze Jr.	Down to You
557	January 20	Jerry Springer	The Jerry Springer Show
558	January 24	Selma Blair	Down to You
559	January 25	Peter Krause	Sports Night
560	January 26	Jenny McCarthy	Scream 3
561	January 27	David Arquette	Scream 3

=== February ===
No.	Date	Guest	Promotion
562	February 1	Jeff Bridges	Simpatico
563	February 2	Focus on New Hampshire Special, special guest Bob Dole	(via satellite) 1-hour special
564	February 3	Jason Priestley	Eye of the Beholder
565	February 14	Moby	Play
566	February 15	Dennis Farina	Reindeer Games
567	February 16	Matthew Perry	The Whole Nine Yards
568	February 17	Ed McMahon	American Family Publishers
569	February 22	Snoop Dogg	Tha Eastsidaz
570	February 23	Charlize Theron	Reindeer Games
571	February 24	Rachael Leigh Cook	FHM Magazine: US edition
572	February 28	Forest Whitaker	Ghost Dog
573	February 29	Vin Diesel	Boiler Room

=== March ===
No.	Date	Guest	Promotion
574	March 1	Tobey Maguire	Wonder Boys
575	March 2	Ellen DeGeneres	If These Walls Could Talk 2
576	March 6	Neil Patrick Harris	Stark Raving Mad
577	March 7	Kevin Pollak	Deterrence
578	March 8	Bob Dole	Super Tuesday
579	March 9	Garry Shandling	What Planet Are You From?
580	March 13	Eddie Izzard	Circle
581	March 14	Kim Delaney	Mission to Mars
582	March 15	Wolf Blitzer	Late Edition with Wolf Blitzer
583	March 16	George Wallace	3 Strikes
584	March 20	Chris Meloni	Law & Order: Special Victims Unit
585	March 21	Marla Sokoloff	Whatever It Takes
586	March 22	Eric Idle	Eric Idle Exploits Monty Python
587	March 23	Leelee Sobieski	Here on Earth
588	March 27	John Lydon	The Filth and the Fury
589	March 28	Joshua Jackson	The Skulls
590	March 29	Sam Donaldson	ABC News
591	March 30	Jimmy Smits	Price of Glory

=== April ===
No.	Date	Guest	Promotion
592	April 10	Roger Daltrey	Blues to the Bush
593	April 11	Ben Stein	Win Ben Stein's Money and Turn Ben Stein On
594	April 12	Patrick Stewart	The Ride Down Mt. Morgan
595	April 13	David Alan Grier	Return to Me
596	April 17	Stanley Tucci	Joe Gould's Secret
597	April 18	Samantha Mathis	American Psycho
598	April 19	Diamond Dallas Page	WCW Monday Nitro, WCW Thunder, Ready To Rumble
599	April 20	Arlen Specter	
600	April 24	Hugh Hefner and Bentley twins	Playboy
601	April 25	Kirsten Dunst	The Virgin Suicides
602	April 26	Jeanne Tripplehorn	Timecode
603	April 27	Stephen Baldwin	The Flintstones in Viva Rock Vegas

=== May ===
No.	Date	Guest	Promotion
604	May 1	S. Epatha Merkerson	Law & Order
605	May 2	Luke Wilson	Committed
606	May 3	Julie Warner	Family Law
607	May 4	Eric Close	Now and Again
608	May 8	Wendie Malick	Just Shoot Me
609	May 9	Jesse L. Martin	Law & Order
610	May 10	Andy Richter	(departure from) Late Night with Conan O'Brien
611	May 11	Betty White	Ladies Man
612	May 15	Tracey Ullman	Small Time Crooks
613	May 16	Kyle MacLachlan	Hamlet
614	May 17	Jane Leeves	Frasier
615	May 18	Michael Rapaport	Small Time Crooks
616	May 30	Laura Kightlinger	Quick Shots of False Hope
617	May 31	Thandie Newton	Mission: Impossible 2

=== June ===
No.	Date	Guest	Promotion
618	June 1	Sonja Christopher	Survivor: Borneo
619	June 5	Penn and Teller	Penn and Teller stage show
620	June 6	Kelli Williams	The Practice
621	June 7	Michael Moore	The Awful Truth
622	June 13	Mark Curry	vegas stage show
623	June 14	Jimmy Kimmel & Adam Carolla	The Man Show
624	June 15	Julie Brown	Strip Mall
625	June 19	Heather Donahue	The Blair Witch Project
626	June 20	Joe Lockhart	none
627	June 21	Freddie Prinze Jr.	Boys and Girls
628	June 22	Alicia Silverstone	Love's Labour's Lost
629	June 26	Cheri Oteri	Scary Movie
630	June 27	Jeff Probst	Survivor: Borneo
631	June 28	Richie Sambora	Bon Jovi
632	June 29	John C. Reilly	The Perfect Storm

=== July ===
No.	Date	Guest	Promotion
633	July 10	Anna Paquin	X-Men
634	July 11	J. K. Simmons	Oz
635	July 12	Famke Janssen	X-Men
636	July 13	Billy Crudup	Jesus' Son
637	July 17	Shawn Wayans & Marlon Wayans	Scary Movie
638	July 18	Halle Berry	X-Men
639	July 19	Fourth Anniversary Special	
640	July 20	Al Roker	Don't Make Me Stop This Car!
641	July 24	Peter Fonda	Thomas and the Magic Railroad
642	July 25	Joe Eszterhas	American Rhapsody
643	July 26	Jennifer Beals	A House Divided
644	July 31	Campaign Trail to the Road to the White House; Mo Rocca, Vance DeGeneres	

=== August ===
No.	Date	Guest	Promotion
645	August 1	Bob Dole	Republican National; Convention coverage
646	August 2	Mary Bono	RNC coverage
647	August 3	Bob Dole	RNC coverage
648	August 4	Robert Reich and Ben Stein	RNC coverage
649	August 15	Bob Kerrey	Democratic National; Convention coverage
650	August 16	William Baldwin	DNC coverage
651	August 17		DNC coverage
652	August 18	Bob Dole	DNC coverage
653	August 22	Jeremy Piven	The Crew
654	August 23	Slash	Ain't Life Grand
655	August 24	Vincent D'Onofrio	The Cell

=== September ===
No.	Date	Guest	Promotion
656	September 5	Donal Logue	The Tao of Steve
657	September 6	Greg Kinnear	Nurse Betty
658	September 7	Spinal Tap	This Is Spinal Tap rerelease
659	September 11	Joe Mantegna	Thin Air
660	September 12	Eugene Levy	Best in Show
661	September 13	Lennox Lewis	Lewis Vs. Tua
662	September 14	Joe Lieberman	2000 Election
663	September 18	Ryan Phillippe	The Way of the Gun
664	September 19	Jamie Lee Curtis	Where Do Balloons Go?
665	September 20	Barenaked Ladies	Barenaked in America
666	September 21	Jamie Foxx	The Jamie Foxx Show
667	September 25	Jonathan Katz	To-Do Lists of the Dead
668	September 26	Bill Goldberg	Halloween Havoc
669	September 27	Sylvester Stallone	Get Carter
670	September 28	Tony Danza	Family Law

=== October ===
No.	Date	Guest	Promotion
671	October 2	Dean Cain	The Broken Hearts Club
672	October 3	Ashton Kutcher	That '70s Show
673	October 4	Jewel	Chasing Down the Dawn
674	October 5	Ralph Nader	2000 Election
675	October 16	Alice Cooper	Brutal Planet
676	October 17	Christian Slater	The Contender
677	October 18	Joshua Jackson	Dawson's Creek
678	October 19	Brendan Fraser	Bedazzled
679	October 23	Kevin James	The King of Queens
680	October 24	Jeff Garlin	Curb Your Enthusiasm
681	October 25	Posh Spice & Baby Spice	Forever
682	October 26	Steven Weber	Cursed
683	October 30	Brett Butler	Comedy Central Roast of Rob Reiner
684	October 31	David Frost	

=== November ===
No.	Date	Guest	Promotion
685	November 1	Phil Donahue	Ralph Nader
686	November 2	Michael Richards	The Michael Richards Show
687	November 6	Arlen Specter	Passion for Truth
688	November 7	Bob Dole	Indecision 2000: Choose and Lose
689	November 8	Richard Belzer	Law & Order: Special Victims Unit
690	November 9	Michael Moore	The Awful Truth
691	November 13	Adam Sandler	Little Nicky
692	November 14	Patricia Arquette	Little Nicky
693	November 15	Adam Sandler	Little Nicky
694	November 16	Rhys Ifans	Little Nicky
695	November 20	Tales of Survival with Vance DeGeneres	
696	November 27	John Goodman	Normal, Ohio
697	November 28	Laura San Giacomo	Just Shoot Me!'s 100th episode
698	November 29	Billy Campbell	Once and Again
699	November 30	Anthony Clark	Yes, Dear

=== December ===
No.	Date	Guest	Promotion
700	December 4	Thomas Gibson	Stardom
701	December 5	Faith Ford	The Norm Show
702	December 6	Chris O'Donnell	Vertical Limit
703	December 7	Marlon Wayans	Dungeons & Dragons
704	December 11	Ira Glass	This American Life
705	December 12	Greta Van Susteren	2000 Election coverage
706	December 13	no guest	Indecision 2000 Special
707	December 14	Wolf Blitzer	Wolf Blitzer Reports
708	December 18	Marla Sokoloff	Dude, Where's My Car?
709	December 19	Marisa Tomei	What Women Want
710	December 20	Jeri Ryan	Dracula 2000
711	December 21	Gillian Anderson	The House of Mirth
