= List of The Daily Show episodes (1998) =

- No. of episodes: 161

Release
- Original network: Comedy Central

Season chronology
- ← Previous; 1997 episodes Next → 1999 episodes

This is a list of episodes for The Daily Show in 1998. It covers shows hosted by Craig Kilborn.

== 1998 ==
=== January ===
No.	Date	Guest	Promotion
226	January 5	Robert Townsend	
227	January 6	Alan Thicke	
228	January 7	Ricki Lake	
229	January 8	Jason Bateman	
230	January 12	Randy Quaid	Hard Rain
231	January 13	Caroline Rhea	Sabrina the Teenage Witch
232	January 14	Tracey Ullman	Tracey Takes On
233	January 15	Dave Chappelle	Half Baked
234	January 19	Bruce Boxleitner	Babylon 5
235	January 20	Alexander Chaplin	
236	January 21	Ben Stiller	Zero Effect
237	January 22	Mark Cohen	
238	January 27	Jim Breuer	Half Baked
239	January 28	Janeane Garofalo	
240	January 29	Matthew Lillard	

=== February ===
No.	Date	Guest	Promotion
241	February 2	Rose McGowan	
242	February 3	Harry Hamlin	
243	February 4	Gloria Reuben	ER
244	February 5	Carol Leifer	
245	February 9	Michael Bergin	Baywatch
246	February 10	Maury Povich	
247	February 11	Jayson Williams	
248	February 12	Richard Lewis	
249	February 17	Dan Cortese	
250	February 18	Marlon Wayans	Senseless
251	February 19	Gordon Elliott	
252	February 23	Jackie Collins	
253	February 24	Michael Boatman	Spin City
254	February 25	Matthew Modine	
255	February 26	Peter Graves	

=== March ===
No.	Date	Guest	Promotion
256	March 9	Miguel Ferrer	LateLine
257	March 10	Timothy Dalton	
258	March 11	Jason Priestley	Beverly Hills 90210
259	March 12	Henry Thomas	Moby Dick
260	March 16	Holly Robinson Peete	For Your Love
261	March 17	Carrot Top	Chairman of the Board
262	March 18	Dave Grohl	
263	March 19	Robert Klein	
264	March 23	Mark Harmon	Chicago Hope
265	March 24	Jeffrey Ross	
266	March 25	Olivia Newton-John	
267	March 26	Vivica A. Fox	
268	March 30	Al Franken	LateLine
269	March 31	Jody Watley	

=== April ===
No.	Date	Guest	Promotion
270	April 1	Dave Foley	NewsRadio
271	April 2	Mimi Rogers	Lost in Space
272	April 13	Natasha Henstridge	Species II
273	April 14	Ben Stein	
274	April 15	Scott Bakula	Major League: Back to the Minors
275	April 16	Denis Leary	
276	April 20	Jonathan Silverman	
277	April 21	Loni Anderson	
278	April 22	Mark Wahlberg	The Big Hit
279	April 23	Johnny Galecki	
280	April 27	Bob Hoskins	
281	April 28	Sheryl Lee Ralph	
282	April 29	Jason Gedrick	
283	April 30	Patrick Swayze	Black Dog

=== May ===
No.	Date	Guest	Promotion
284	May 4	Paul Rudd	
285	May 5	Natasha Gregson Wagner	
286	May 6	Patrick Swayze	
287	May 7	Jon Favreau	
288	May 18	Rob Estes	Melrose Place
289	May 19	Jack Wagner	Dirty Little Secrets
290	May 20	Tiffani Amber Thiessen	Beverly Hills 90210
291	May 21	Doug Savant	Godzilla
292	May 26	Andy Kindler	
293	May 27	Matthew Perry	Almost Heroes
294	May 28	Suzanne Somers	

=== June ===
No.	Date	Guest	Promotion
295	June 1	Bobcat Goldthwait	
296	June 2	Eric Stoltz	
297	June 3	David Boreanaz	Buffy the Vampire Slayer
298	June 4	Jeff Foxworthy	
299	June 8	Jon Cryer	
300	June 9	Marilu Henner	
301	June 10	Norm Macdonald	Dirty Work
302	June 11	Peter MacNicol	Ally McBeal
303	June 16	William Shatner	
304	June 17	Bob Saget	
305	June 18	Cathy Lee Crosby	
306	June 22	Peter Scolari	
307	June 23	Roma Maffia	
308	June 24	Greg Germann	Ally McBeal
309	June 25	Scott Thompson	
310	June 29	Veronica Webb	
311	June 30	Diamond Dallas Page	

=== July ===
No.	Date	Guest	Promotion
312	July 1	Joy Behar	
313	July 20	Tony Randall	
314	July 21	Richard Lewis	
315	July 22	Kathy Griffin	
316	July 23	Jay Mohr	
317	July 27	Jerry Mathers	
318	July 28	Jonathan Katz	
319	July 29	Yasmine Bleeth	BASEketball
320	July 30	David Brenner	

=== August ===
No.	Date	Guest	Promotion
321	August 3	Nick DiPaolo	
322	August 4	Lisa Ann Walter	
323	August 5	Lemmy	
324	August 6	Adam Arkin	Chicago Hope
325	August 10	Dana Gould	
326	August 11	Carla Gugino	
327	August 12	LL Cool J	Halloween H20: 20 Years Later
328	August 13	Penn & Teller	
329	August 17	Joyce Brothers	
330	August 18	Joseph Gordon-Levitt	Halloween H20: 20 Years Later
331	August 19	Debbie Matenopoulos	
332	August 20	Sela Ward	
333	August 24	Josie Bissett	Melrose Place
334	August 25	Pam Grier	
335	August 26	Rosanna Arquette	
336	August 27	Amy Brenneman	

=== September ===
No.	Date	Guest	Promotion
337	September 8	Peter Gallagher	
338	September 9	Colin Quinn	Saturday Night Live
339	September 10	Terry Jones	Ancient Inventions series
340	September 14	René Hicks	
341	September 15	Dr. Ruth	
342	September 16	Ben Stiller	Permanent Midnight
343	September 17	Vince Vaughn	Clay Pigeons
344	September 21	Jackie Chan	Rush Hour
345	September 22	Bonnie Raitt	
346	September 23	Denis Leary	
347	September 24	Janeane Garofalo	Clay Pigeons
348	September 28	Brian Benben	
349	September 29	John Waters	Pecker
350	September 30	Will Ferrell & Chris Kattan	A Night at the Roxbury

=== October ===
No.	Date	Guest	Promotion
351	October 1	Faith Ford	Maggie Winters
352	October 5	Billy Connolly	
353	October 6	Richard Grieco	
354	October 7	Dee Snider	
355	October 8	Jeff Goldblum	Holy Man
356	October 19	Stephen Baldwin	
357	October 20	Chris Elliott	
358	October 21	Jennifer Tilly	
359	October 22	Erik Estrada & Larry Wilcox	CHiPs '99
360	October 26	Margaret Cho	
361	October 27	David Cross & Bob Odenkirk	Mr. Show
362	October 28	Kevin Sorbo	Hercules: The Legendary Journeys
363	October 29	Kevin James	The King of Queens

=== November ===
No.	Date	Guest	Promotion
364	November 2	Blair Underwood	
365	November 3	Upright Citizens Brigade	Upright Citizens Brigade
366	November 4	Queen Latifah	Living Out Loud
367	November 5	Henry Winkler	The Waterboy
368	November 9	John Fugelsang	America's Funniest Home Videos
369	November 10	Travis Tritt	
370	November 11	Roma Downey	Touched by an Angel
371	November 16	Ken Olin	L.A. Doctors
372	November 17	Kate Mulgrew	Star Trek: Voyager
373	November 18	Shannen Doherty	Charmed
374	November 19	Jerry Springer	Ringmaster
375	November 30	Jon Favreau	

=== December ===
No.	Date	Guest	Promotion
376	December 1	Todd Rundgren	
377	December 2	Patricia Heaton	Everybody Loves Raymond
378	December 3	Bill Maher	
379	December 7	Tim Conway	
380	December 8	Elijah Wood	The Faculty
381	December 9	Jeremy Piven	
382	December 10	Patrick Stewart	Star Trek: Insurrection
383	December 14	Wendie Malick	Just Shoot Me!
384	December 15	Deborah Norville	
385	December 16	Jon Stewart	The Faculty and The Daily Show with Jon Stewart
386	December 17	Richard Lewis	
