= I May Be Wrong but I Doubt It =

2002 book by Charles Barkley

I May Be Wrong But I Doubt It
- Cover of the book
- Author: Charles Barkley, Michael Wilbon
- Language: English
- Subject: Autobiography, Memoir
- Publisher: Random House
- Publication date: October 1, 2002
- Publication place: United States
- Media type: Print (Hardcover and Paperback and audio-CD
- Pages: 272 (hardcover edition)
- ISBN: 0-375-50883-X (hardcover edition)
- OCLC: 50252014
- Dewey Decimal: 796.323/092 B 21
- LC Class: GV884.B28 A29 2003

I May Be Wrong but I Doubt It is a memoir by former American professional basketball player Charles Barkley. The book became a bestseller in 2002 and sold more than 125,000 copies. It reflects Barkley's own personality, experiences, and opinions. It explores a wide range of interests and discusses a variety of controversial topics. Each chapter has its own theme, and ranges from politics to lack of minority control in sports. It also recounts some of Barkley's memorable experiences during his Hall of Fame NBA career, such as his involvement with Michael Jordan as a member of the legendary U.S. Olympic gold medal winning "Dream Team."

== See also ==
- Michael Wilbon
