= Charles Barkley =

American basketball player and analyst (born 1963)

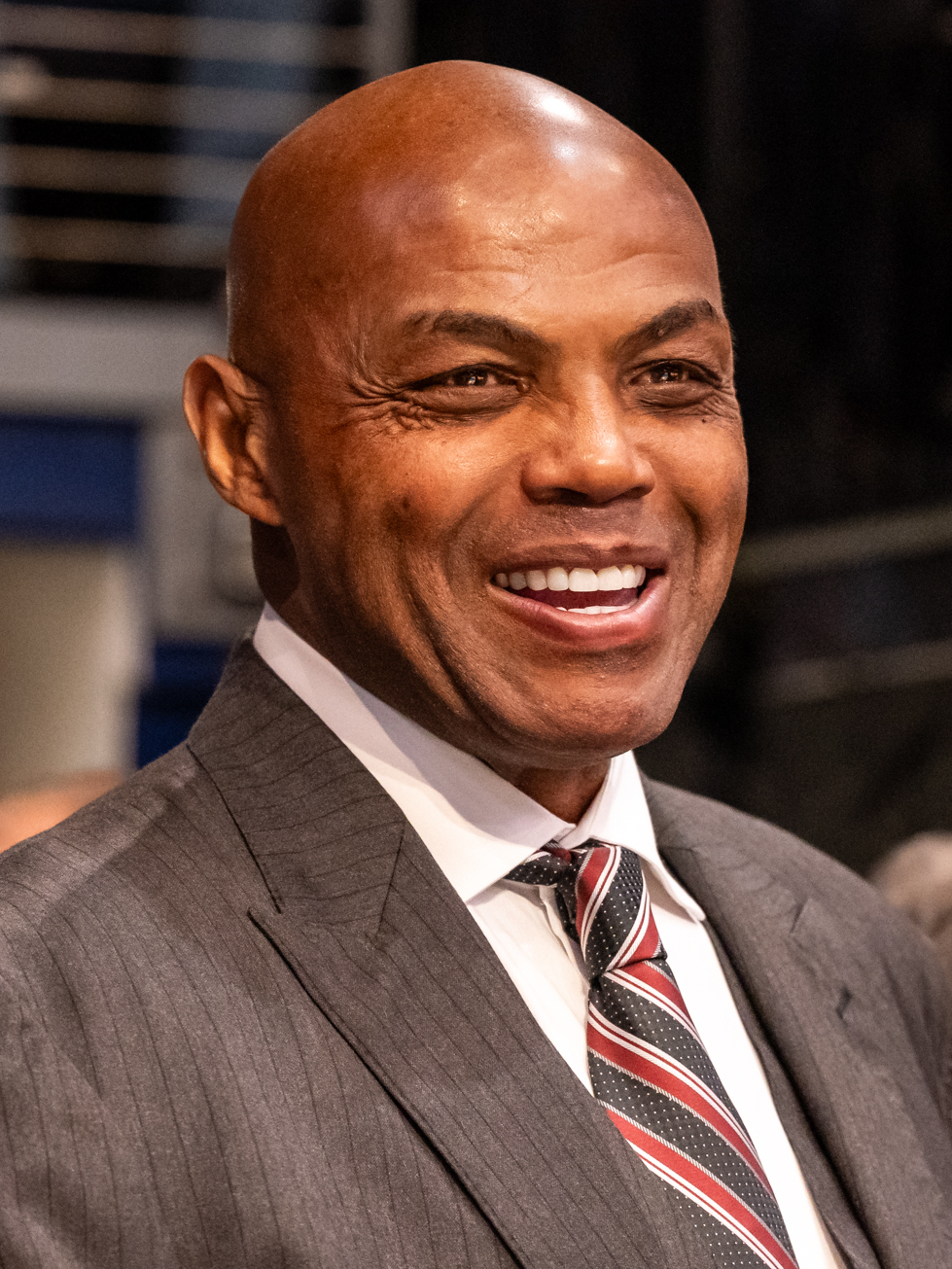
- Barkley in 2026

Personal information
- Born: February 20, 1963 (age 63) Leeds, Alabama, U.S.
- Listed height: 6 ft 6 in (1.98 m)
- Listed weight: 252 lb (114 kg)

Career information
- High school: Leeds (Leeds, Alabama)
- College: Auburn (1981–1984)
- NBA draft: 1984: 1st round, 5th overall pick
- Drafted by: Philadelphia 76ers
- Playing career: 1984–2000
- Position: Power forward / small forward
- Number: 34, 32, 4

Career history
- 1984–1992: Philadelphia 76ers
- 1992–1996: Phoenix Suns
- 1996–2000: Houston Rockets

Career highlights
- NBA Most Valuable Player (1993); 11× NBA All-Star (1987–1997); NBA All-Star Game MVP (1991); 5× All-NBA First Team (1988–1991, 1993); 5× All-NBA Second Team (1986, 1987, 1992, 1994, 1995); All-NBA Third Team (1996); NBA All-Rookie First Team (1985); NBA rebounding leader (1987); NBA anniversary team (50th, 75th); No. 34 retired by Philadelphia 76ers; No. 34 retired by Phoenix Suns; Third-team All-American – NABC (1984); SEC Player of the Year (1984); First-team All-SEC (1984); 2× Second-team All-SEC (1982, 1983); SEC tournament MVP (1984); No. 34 retired by Auburn Tigers

Career NBA statistics
- Points: 23,757 (22.1 ppg)
- Rebounds: 12,546 (11.7 rpg)
- Assists: 4,215 (3.9 apg)
- Stats at NBA.com
- Stats at Basketball Reference
- Basketball Hall of Fame
- Collegiate Basketball Hall of Fame
Medals
Representing the United States
Men's national basketball team
Olympic Games
Gold medal – first place	1992 Barcelona	Men's basketball
Gold medal – first place	1996 Atlanta	Men's basketball
FIBA Americas Championship
Gold medal – first place	1992 Portland	Men's basketball

Charles Wade Barkley (born February 20, 1963) is an American former professional basketball player who is a television analyst on TNT Sports and CBS Sports. Nicknamed "Sir Charles", "the Chuckster", and "the Round Mound of Rebound", Barkley played 16 seasons in the National Basketball Association (NBA). Though shorter than the typical power forward, he used his strength and aggression to become one of the NBA's best rebounders and scorers. Barkley was an 11-time NBA All-Star, 11-time member of the All-NBA Team, and the 1993 NBA Most Valuable Player (MVP). He was named to the NBA's 50th and 75th anniversary teams.

An All-American at Auburn University, Barkley was drafted as a junior by the Philadelphia 76ers with the fifth pick of the 1984 NBA draft. In his rookie season, Barkley was named to the All-Rookie First Team in 1985. In the 1986–87 season, Barkley led the league in rebounding average and earned his first rebounding title. He was named the All-Star Game MVP in 1991, and in 1993 with the Phoenix Suns, he was voted the league's MVP while leading the team to the NBA Finals. He also competed in the 1992 and 1996 Olympic Games, winning two gold medals as a member of the U.S. national team. In 2000, Barkley retired as the fourth player in NBA history to achieve 20,000 points, 10,000 rebounds, and 4,000 assists. (Note: Since his retirement, Tim Duncan, Kevin Garnett, and LeBron James have joined the 20K/10K/4K Club.) Barkley is a two-time inductee into the Naismith Memorial Basketball Hall of Fame, inducted in 2006 for his individual career and in 2010 as a member of the 1992 Olympic "Dream Team".

Barkley was popular with the fans and media and made the NBA's All-Interview Team for his last 13 seasons in the league. He was frequently involved in on- and off-court fights and sometimes stirred national controversy, such as in March 1991 when he spat on a young girl while attempting to spit at a heckler, and 1993 when he declared that sports figures should not be considered role models. Since retiring as a player, Barkley has had a successful career as an NBA analyst. He works for TNT Sports on Inside the NBA alongside Shaquille O'Neal, Kenny Smith, and Ernie Johnson as a studio pundit (for which he has won five Sports Emmy Awards). In addition, Barkley has written several books, and has shown an interest in politics.

== Early life ==
Barkley was born in Leeds, Alabama, 17 miles (27 km) east of Birmingham, and grew up there. He was the first black baby born at a segregated, all-white town hospital and was in the first group of black students at his elementary school. His parents divorced when he was young after his father abandoned the family, which included younger brother Darryl Barkley. His mother remarried and they had a son, John Glenn. Another brother, Rennie, died in infancy. His stepfather was killed in an accident when Charles was 11 years old.

Barkley attended Leeds High School. As a junior, he stood 5 ft 10 in (1.78 m) and weighed 220 pounds (100 kg). He failed to make the varsity team and was named as a reserve. However, during the summer Barkley grew to 6 ft 4 in (1.93 m) and earned a starting position on the varsity as a senior. He averaged 19.1 points and 17.9 rebounds per game and led his team to a 26–3 record en route to the state semi-finals. Despite his improvement, Barkley received no attention from college scouts until the state high school semi-finals, where he scored 26 points against Alabama's most highly recruited player, Bobby Lee Hurt. An assistant to Auburn University's head coach, Sonny Smith, was at the game and reported seeing, "a fat guy... who can play like the wind". Barkley was soon recruited by Smith and majored in business management while attending Auburn University.

== College career ==
Barkley played collegiate basketball for the Auburn Tigers for three seasons. Although he struggled to control his weight, he excelled as a player and led the SEC in rebounding each year. He became a popular crowd-pleaser, exciting the fans with dunks and blocked shots that belied his lack of height and overweight frame. It was not uncommon to see the hefty Barkley grab a defensive rebound and, instead of passing, dribble the entire length of the court and finish at the opposite end with a two-handed dunk. His physical size and skills ultimately earned him the nickname "The Round Mound of Rebound" and the "Crisco Kid".

During his college career, Barkley played center, despite being shorter than the average center. His height, officially listed as 6 ft 6 in (1.98 m), is stated as 6 ft 4 in (1.93 m) in his book, I May Be Wrong but I Doubt It. He became a member of Auburn's All-Century team and still holds the Auburn record for career field goal percentage with 62.6%. He received numerous awards, including Southeastern Conference (SEC) Player of the Year (1984), three All-SEC selections and one Second Team All-American selection. Later, Barkley was named the SEC Player of the Decade for the 1980s by the Birmingham Post-Herald.

In Barkley's three-year college career, he averaged 14.1 points on 62.6% field goal shooting, 9.6 rebounds, 1.6 assists, and 1.7 blocks per game. In 1984, he led the Tigers to their first NCAA tournament in school history and finished with 23 points on 80% field goal shooting, 17 rebounds, four assists, two steals, and two blocks. Auburn retired Barkley's No. 34 jersey on March 3, 2001.

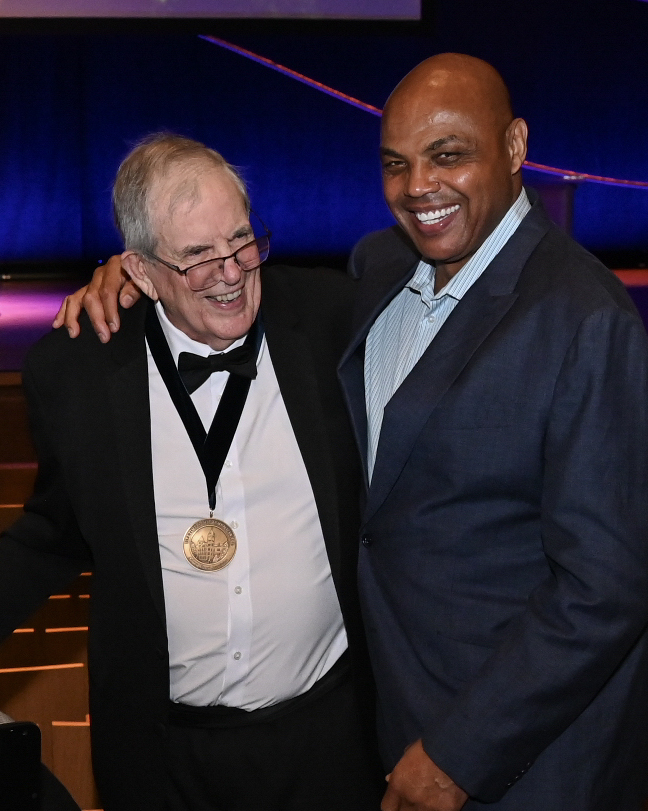
Barkley with Sonny Smith, his coach at Auburn University.

He was one of 74 college players invited to the spring tryouts for the 1984 U.S. Olympic team coached by Bob Knight. Barkley made the initial cut in April to the final 20, but was one of four released in May (with John Stockton, Terry Porter, and Maurice Martin) in the penultimate cut to 16 players. In 2010, Barkley admitted that he asked for and had been given, money from sports agents during his career at Auburn. Barkley called the sums he had requested from agents "chump change", and went on to say, "Why can't an agent lend me some money and I'll pay him back when I graduate?" According to Barkley, he paid back all of the money he had borrowed after signing his first NBA contract.

== Professional career ==
=== Philadelphia 76ers (1984–1992) ===
Barkley left before his final year at Auburn and made himself eligible for the 1984 NBA draft. He was selected with the fifth pick in the first round by the Philadelphia 76ers, two slots after the Chicago Bulls drafted Michael Jordan. He joined a veteran team that included Julius Erving, Moses Malone, and Maurice Cheeks, players who had taken Philadelphia to the 1983 NBA championship. Under the tutelage of Malone, Barkley was able to manage his weight and learned to prepare and condition himself properly for a game; Barkley cited Malone as the most influential player of his career, and he often referred to him as "Dad". He averaged 14.0 points and 8.6 rebounds per game during the regular season and earned a berth on the All-Rookie Team. In the postseason, the Sixers advanced to the Eastern Conference Finals but were defeated in five games by the Boston Celtics. As a rookie in the postseason, Barkley averaged 14.9 points and 11.1 rebounds per game.

During his second year, Barkley improved his game under the leadership of Moses Malone during the off-season with his workouts, in the process he became the team's leading rebounder and number two scorer, averaging 20.0 points and 12.8 rebounds per game. He became the Sixers' starting power forward and helped lead his team into the playoffs, averaging 25.0 points on .578 shooting from the field and 15.8 rebounds per game. Despite his efforts, Philadelphia was defeated 4–3 by the Milwaukee Bucks in the Eastern Conference Semifinals. He was named to the All-NBA Second Team.

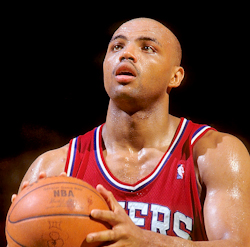
Barkley in 1991

Before the 1986–87 season, Moses Malone was traded to the Washington Bullets and Barkley began to assume control as the team leader. On November 4, 1986, Barkley recorded 34 points, 10 rebounds, and a career-high 14 assists in a 125–121 loss to the Indiana Pacers. On March 20, 1987, Barkley recorded 26 points, 25 rebounds (including a career-high-tying 16 offensive rebounds), and nine assists in a 116–106 win over the Denver Nuggets. He earned his first and only rebounding title, averaging 14.6 rebounds per game, and also led the league in offensive rebounds with 5.7 per game. He averaged 23.0 points on .594 shooting, earning his first trip to an NBA All-Star game and All-NBA Second Team honors for the second straight season. In the playoffs, Barkley averaged 24.6 points and 12.6 rebounds in a losing effort, for the second straight year, to the Bucks in a five-game first-round playoff series.

The next season, Julius Erving announced his retirement and Barkley became the Sixers' franchise player. On November 30, 1988, Barkley recorded 41 points, 22 rebounds, five assists, and six steals in a 114–106 win over the Blazers. Playing in 80 games and getting 300 more minutes than his nearest teammate, Barkley had his most productive season, averaging 28.3 points on .587 shooting and 11.9 rebounds per game. He appeared in his second All-Star Game and was named to the All-NBA First Team for the first time in his career. His celebrity status as the Sixers' franchise player led to his first appearance on the cover of Sports Illustrated. For the first time since the 1974–75 season, however, the 76ers failed to make the playoffs. In the 1988–89 season, Barkley continued to play well, averaging 25.8 points on .579 shooting and 12.5 rebounds per game. He earned his third straight All-Star Game appearance and was named to the All-NBA First team for the second straight season. Despite Barkley contributing 27.0 points on .644 shooting, 11.7 rebounds, and 5.3 assists per game, the 76ers were swept in the first round of the playoffs by the New York Knicks.

During the 1989–90 season, despite receiving more first-place votes, Barkley finished second in MVP voting behind the Los Angeles Lakers' Magic Johnson. He was named Player of the Year by The Sporting News and Basketball Weekly. He averaged 25.2 points and 11.5 rebounds per game and a career-high .600 shooting. He was named to the All-NBA First Team for the third consecutive year and earned his fourth All-Star selection. He helped Philadelphia win 53 regular-season games, only to lose to the Chicago Bulls in a five-game Eastern Conference Semi-finals series. Barkley averaged 24.7 points and 15.5 rebounds in another postseason loss. His exceptional play continued into his seventh season, where he averaged 27.6 points on .570 shooting and 10.1 rebounds per game. His fifth straight All-Star Game appearance proved to be his best yet. He led the East to a 116–114 win over the West with 17 points and 22 rebounds, the most rebounds in an All-Star Game since Wilt Chamberlain recorded 22 in 1967. Barkley was presented with Most Valuable Player honors at the All-Star Game and, at the end of the season, named to the All-NBA First Team for the fourth straight year. That year, when the New York Times asked the San Antonio Spurs center David Robinson if he would choose Barkley or Jordan for his side in a hypothetical pickup game, Robinson said, "I would pick Barkley. When he is on his game, I think he has the biggest impact ever." In the playoffs, Philadelphia lost again to Jordan's Chicago Bulls in the Eastern Conference Semi-finals, with Barkley contributing 24.9 points and 10.5 rebounds per game.

The 1991–92 season was Barkley's final year in Philadelphia. In his last season, he wore number 32 instead of his 34 to honor Magic Johnson, who had announced prior to the start of the season that he was HIV-positive. Although the 76ers had initially retired the number 32 in honor of Billy Cunningham, it was unretired, with Cunningham's approval, for Barkley to wear. After Johnson's announcement, Barkley apologized for having made light of his condition. Responding to concerns that players may contract HIV by contact with Johnson, Barkley expressed his opinion, "We're just playing basketball. It's not like we're going out to have unprotected sex with Magic."

In his final season with the Sixers, averaging 23.1 points on .552 shooting and 11.1 rebounds per game, Barkley earned his sixth-straight All-Star appearance and was named to the All-NBA Second Team, his seventh straight appearance on either the first or second team. He ended his 76ers career ranked fourth in team history in total points (14,184), third in scoring average (23.3 ppg), third in rebounds (7,079), eighth in assists (2,276) and second in field-goal percentage (.576). He led Philadelphia in rebounding and field-goal percentage for seven consecutive seasons and in scoring for six straight years. However, Barkley was said to have demanded a trade out of Philadelphia after the Sixers failed to make the postseason with a 35–47 record. That was later refuted by Charles Barkley himself, who said that he had not demanded a trade, but was not happy and wanted out. Rather than wait until his contract ran out and lose their superstar for nothing, the 76ers traded him. Barkley was initially traded to the Los Angeles Lakers before the end of the season, but the 76ers wound up retracting their deal a few hours later. On July 17, 1992, he was officially traded to the Phoenix Suns in exchange for Jeff Hornacek, Tim Perry, and Andrew Lang.

During Barkley's eight seasons in Philadelphia, he became a household name and was one of the few NBA players to have an action figure produced by Kenner's Starting Lineup toy line. He also had his own signature shoe line with Nike. His outspoken and aggressive play, however, resulted in some on-court incidents, notoriously a fight with Detroit Pistons center Bill Laimbeer in 1990, which drew a record total $162,500 fine.

==== Spitting incident ====
On March 26, 1991, during a game versus the New Jersey Nets, Barkley attempted to spit on a fan who was allegedly heckling him with racial slurs, but the result was that his spit hit a young girl. Rod Thorn, the NBA's president of operations at the time, suspended Barkley, without pay, for one game and fined him $10,000 for spitting and for verbally abusing the fan. It became a national story, and Barkley was vilified for it. Barkley, however, eventually developed a friendship with the girl and her family. He apologized and, among other things, provided them with tickets to future games.

After retirement, Barkley was later quoted saying in regard to his career, "I was fairly controversial, I guess, but I regret only one thing–the spitting incident. But you know what? It taught me a valuable lesson. It taught me that I was getting way too intense during the game. It let me know I wanted to win way too bad. I had to calm down. I wanted to win at all costs. Instead of playing the game the right way and respecting the game, I only thought about winning."

=== Phoenix Suns (1992–1996) ===
The trade to Phoenix in the 1992–93 season went well for both Barkley and the Suns. Suns player Negele Knight already wore No. 32, so Barkley reverted his jersey number back to 34. In his first game with the Suns, Barkley almost recorded a triple-double, racking up 37 points, 21 rebounds (12 of them offensive), and 8 assists in a 111–105 victory over the Los Angeles Clippers. He averaged 25.6 points on .520 shooting, 12.2 rebounds and a career-high 5.1 assists per game, leading the Suns to an NBA-best 62–20 record. For his efforts, Barkley won the league's Most Valuable Player Award, and was selected to play in his seventh straight All-Star Game. He became the third player ever to win league MVP honors in the season immediately after being traded, established multiple career highs and led Phoenix to their first NBA Finals appearance since 1976. Despite Barkley's proclamation to Jordan that it was "destiny" for the Suns to win the title, they were defeated in six games by the Chicago Bulls. He averaged 26.6 points and 13.6 rebounds per game during the whole postseason, including 27.3 points, 13.0 rebounds and 5.5 assists per game in the championship series. In the fourth game of the Finals, Barkley recorded a triple-double, collecting 32 points, 12 rebounds and 10 assists.

As a result of severe back pains, Barkley began to speculate that the 1993–94 season would be his last in Phoenix. Despite the back pain, he started the season by winning the 1993 McDonald's Open in Germany and being named the tournament's MVP. In the NBA, Barkley managed 21.6 points on .495 shooting and 11.2 rebounds per game. He was selected to his eighth consecutive All-Star Game, but did not play because of a torn right quadriceps tendon, and was named to the All-NBA Second Team. With Barkley fighting injuries, the Suns still managed a 56–26 record and made it to the Western Conference Semifinals. Despite holding a 2–0 lead in the series, the Suns lost in seven games to the eventual champions, the Houston Rockets, who were led by Hakeem Olajuwon. Despite his injuries, in Game 3 of a first-round playoff series against the Golden State Warriors, Barkley hit 23 of 31 field-goal attempts and finished with 56 points, the then-third-highest total ever in a playoff game. After contemplating retirement in the off-season, Barkley returned for his eleventh season and continued to battle injuries. He struggled during the first half of the season, but gradually managed to improve, earning his ninth consecutive appearance in the All-Star Game. He averaged 23 points on .486 shooting and 11.1 rebounds per game, while leading the Suns to a 59–23 record. In the playoffs, despite having a 3–1 lead in the series, the Suns once again lost to the defending and eventual two-time champion Houston Rockets in seven games. Barkley averaged 25.7 points on .500 shooting and 13.4 rebounds per game in the postseason, but was limited in Game 7 of the semi-finals by a leg injury.

The 1995–96 season was Barkley's last with the Phoenix Suns. He led the team in scoring, rebounds and steals, averaging 23.3 points on .500 shooting, 11.6 rebounds and a career high .777 free throw shooting. He earned his tenth appearance in an All-Star Game as the top vote-getter among Western Conference players and posted his 18th career triple-double on November 22. He also became just the tenth player in NBA history to reach 20,000 points and 10,000 rebounds in their career. In the postseason, Barkley averaged 25.5 points and 13.5 rebounds per game in a four-game first round playoff loss to the San Antonio Spurs. After the Suns closed out the season with a 41–41 record and a first-round playoff loss, Barkley was traded to Houston in exchange for Sam Cassell, Robert Horry, Mark Bryant, and Chucky Brown.

During his career with the Suns, Barkley excelled, earning All-NBA and All-Star honors in each of his four seasons.

==== Role model controversy ====
Throughout his career, Barkley argued that athletes should not be considered role models. He said, "A million guys can dunk a basketball in jail; should they be role models?" In 1993, his argument prompted national news when he wrote the text for his "I am not a role model" Nike commercial. Dan Quayle, the former Vice President of the United States, called it a "family-values message" for Barkley's oft-ignored call for parents and teachers to quit looking to him to "raise your kids" and instead be role models themselves.

Barkley's message sparked a great public debate about the nature of role models. He argued:

I think the media demands that athletes be role models because there's some jealousy involved. It's as if they say, this is a young black kid playing a game for a living and making all this money, so we're going to make it tough on him. And what they're really doing is telling kids to look up to someone they can't become, because not many people can be like we are. Kids can't be like Michael Jordan.

=== Houston Rockets (1996–2000) ===
The trade to the Houston Rockets in the 1996–97 season was Barkley's last chance at capturing an NBA championship title. He joined a veteran team that included two of the NBA's 50 Greatest Players, Hakeem Olajuwon and Clyde Drexler. To begin the season, Barkley was suspended for the season opener and fined $5,000 for fighting Charles Oakley during an October 25, 1996 preseason game. After Oakley committed a flagrant foul on Barkley, Barkley responded by shoving Oakley. In his first game with the Houston Rockets, Barkley had a career-high 33 rebounds. He continued to battle injuries throughout the season and played only 53 games, missing 14 because of a laceration and bruise on his left pelvis, 11 because of a sprained right ankle, and four due to suspensions. He became the team's second-leading scorer, averaging 19.2 points on .484 shooting; the first time since his rookie year that he averaged below 20 points per game. With Olajuwon taking most of the shots, Barkley focused primarily on rebounding, averaging 13.5 per game, the second-best in his career. The Rockets ended the regular season with a 57–25 record and advanced to the Western Conference Finals, where they were defeated in six games by the Utah Jazz. Barkley averaged 17.9 points and 12.0 rebounds per game in another postseason loss.

The 1997–98 season was another injury-plagued year for Barkley. He averaged 15.2 points on .485 shooting and 11.7 rebounds per game. The Rockets ended the season with a 41–41 record and were eliminated in five games by the Utah Jazz in the first round of the playoffs. Limited by injuries, Barkley played four games in the series and averaged career lows of 9.0 points and 5.3 rebounds in 21.8 minutes per game. During the lockout-shortened season, Barkley played 42 regular-season games and managed 16.1 points on .478 shooting and 12.3 rebounds per game. He became the second player in NBA history, following Wilt Chamberlain, to accumulate 23,000 points, 12,000 rebounds and 4,000 assists in his career. The Rockets concluded the shortened season with a 31–19 record and advanced to the playoffs. In his last postseason appearance, Barkley averaged 23.5 points on .529 shooting and 13.8 rebounds per game in a first-round playoff loss to the Los Angeles Lakers. He concluded his postseason career averaging 23 points on .513 shooting, 12.9 rebounds and 3.9 assists per game in 123 games.

The 1999–2000 season was Barkley's final year in the NBA. Initially, Barkley averaged 14.5 points on .477 shooting and 10.5 rebounds per game. Along with Shaquille O'Neal, Barkley was ejected from a November 10, 1999 game against the Los Angeles Lakers. After O'Neal blocked a layup by Barkley, O'Neal shoved Barkley, who then threw the ball at O'Neal. Barkley's season and career seemingly ended prematurely at the age of 36 after rupturing his left quadriceps tendon on December 8, 1999, in Philadelphia, where his career began. Refusing to allow his injury to be the last image of his career, Barkley returned after four months for one final game. On April 19, 2000, in a home game against the Vancouver Grizzlies, Barkley scored a memorable basket on an offensive rebound and putback, a common trademark during his career. He accomplished what he set out to do after being activated from the injured list, and walked off the court to a standing ovation. He stated, "I can't explain what tonight meant. I did it for me. I've won and lost a lot of games, but the last memory I had was being carried off the court. I couldn't get over the mental block of being carried off the court. It was important psychologically to walk off the court on my own." After the basket, Barkley immediately retired and concluded his sixteen-year Hall of Fame career.

== Olympics ==
Barkley was invited by Bob Knight to try out for United States men's basketball team for the 1984 Summer Olympics. He made it all the way to final cuts, but was not selected for the team, despite outplaying almost all of the front-court players there. According to Knight, Barkley was cut because of poor defense.

Barkley competed in the 1992 and 1996 Olympic Games and won two gold medals as a member of the United States men's basketball team. International rules that previously prevented NBA players from playing in the Olympics were changed in 1992, allowing Barkley and fellow NBA players to compete in the Olympics for the first time. The team was nicknamed the "Dream Team" and went 6–0 in the Olympic qualifying tournament and 8–0 against Olympic opponents. The team averaged an Olympic record 117.3 points a game and won games by an average of 43.8 points, only surpassed by the 1956 U.S. Olympic team. Barkley led the team with 18.0 points on 71.1% field goal shooting and set a then-Olympic single-game scoring record with 30 points in a 127–83 victory over Brazil. He also set a U.S. Men's Olympic record for highest three-point field goal percentage with 87.5% and added 4.1 rebounds and 2.6 steals per game. During the game versus Angola, Barkley elbowed Herlander Coimbra in the chest and was unapologetic after the game, claiming he was hit first. Barkley was called for an intentional foul on the play. Coimbra's resulting free throw was the only point scored by Angola during a 46–1 run by the U.S.

At the 1996 Atlanta Summer Olympic Games, Barkley led the team in scoring, rebounds, and field goal percentage. He averaged 12.4 points on 81.6% field goal shooting, setting a U.S. Men's Olympic record. In addition, he also contributed 6.6 rebounds per game. Under Barkley's leadership, the team once again compiled a perfect 8–0 record and captured gold medal.

== Player profile ==
Barkley played the power forward position, but occasionally played small forward and center. He was known for his unusual build as a basketball player, stockier than most small forwards, yet shorter than most power forwards he faced. However, Barkley was still capable of outplaying both taller and quicker opponents because of his unusual combination of strength and agility.

Barkley was a prolific scorer who averaged 22.1 points per game during the regular season for his career and 23.0 points per game in the playoffs for his career. Barkley was an incredibly efficient offensive force, leading the NBA in 2-point field goal percentage every season from the 1986–87 season to the 1990–91 season. He led the league in effective field goal percentage in both the 1986–87 and 1987–88 seasons as well, and also led the league in offensive rating in both the 1988–89 and 1989–90 seasons. He was one of the NBA's most versatile players and accurate scorers capable of scoring from anywhere on the court and established himself as one of the NBA's premier clutch players. During his NBA career, Barkley was a constant mismatch because he possessed a very uncommon combination of skills and could play in a variety of positions. He would use all facets of his game in a single play; as a scorer, he had the ability to score from the perimeter and the post, using an array of spin moves and fadeaways, or finishing a fast break with a powerful dunk. He was one of the most efficient scorers of all time, scoring at 54.13% total field goal percentage for his season career and 51.34% total field goal shooting for his playoff career (including a career-high season average of 60% during the 1989–90 NBA season).

Barkley is the shortest player in NBA history to lead the league in rebounding when he averaged a career-high 14.6 rebounds per game during the 1986–87 season. His tenacious and aggressive form of play built into an undersized frame that fluctuated between 284 pounds (129 kg) and 252 pounds (114 kg) helped cement his legacy as one of the greatest rebounders in NBA history, averaging 11.7 rebounds per game in the regular season for his career and 12.9 rebounds per game in his playoff career and totaling 12,546 rebounds for his season career. Barkley topped the NBA in offensive rebounding for three straight years and was most famous among very few power forwards who could control a defensive rebound, dribble the length of the court and finish at the rim with a powerful dunk.

Barkley also possessed considerable defensive talents led by an aggressive demeanor, foot speed and his capacity to read the floor to anticipate for steals, a reason why he established his career as the second All-Time leader in steals for the power forward position and leader of the highest all-time steal per game average for the power forward position. Despite being undersized for both the small forward and power forward positions, he also finished among the all-time leaders in blocked shots. His speed and leaping ability made him one of the few power forwards capable of running down court to block a faster player with a chase-down block.

In a SLAM magazine issue ranking NBA greats, Barkley was ranked among the top 20 players of All-Time. In the magazine, NBA Hall-of-Famer Bill Walton commented on Barkley's ability. Walton said, "Barkley is like Magic [Johnson] and Larry [Bird] in that they don't really play a position. He plays everything; he plays basketball. There is nobody who does what Barkley does. He's a dominant rebounder, a dominant defensive player, a three-point shooter, a dribbler, a playmaker."

== Legacy ==
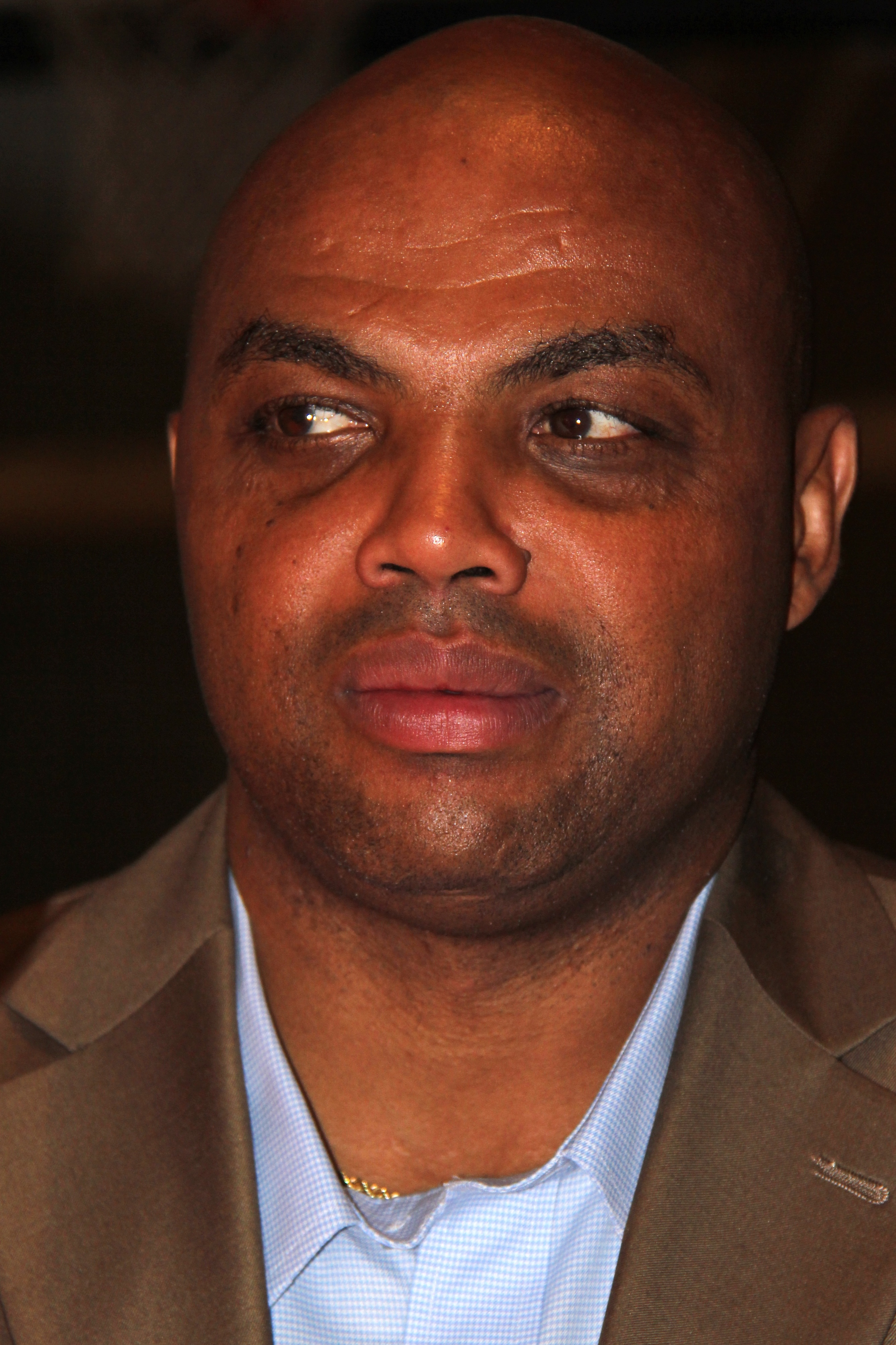
Barkley at the 2010 NBA Hall of Fame induction

During his 16-year NBA career, Barkley was regarded as one of the most controversial, outspoken, and dominating players in the history of basketball. His impact on the sport went beyond his rebounding titles, assists, scoring and physical play. His confrontational mannerisms often led to technical fouls and fines on the court, and his larger-than life persona sometimes gave rise to national controversy off of it, such as when he was featured in ads that rejected pro athletes as role models and declared, "I am not a role model." Although his words often led to controversy, according to Barkley his mouth was never the cause because it always spoke the truth. He said, "I don't create controversies. They're there long before I open my mouth. I just bring them to your attention."

Besides his on-court fights with other players, he has exhibited confrontational behavior off-court. He was arrested for breaking a man's nose during a fight after a game with the Milwaukee Bucks and also for throwing a man through a plate-glass window in Orlando, after being struck with a glass of ice. Barkley continues to be popular with the fans and media.

As a player, Barkley was a perennial All-Star who earned league MVP honors in 1993. He employed a physical style of play that earned him the nicknames "Sir Charles" and "The Round Mound of Rebound". He was named to the All-NBA team eleven times and earned two gold medals as a member of the United States Olympic Basketball team. He led both teams in scoring and was instrumental in helping the 1992 "Dream Team" and 1996 Men's Basketball team compile a perfect 16–0 record. He retired as one of only four players in NBA history to record at least 20,000 points, 10,000 rebounds and 4,000 assists in their career. As of 2023, he has the 12th highest PER in NBA history and is 14th in win shares.

In 1996, Barkley, as part of the NBA's 50th Anniversary, was honored as one of the 50 greatest players of all time by being named to the NBA's 50th Anniversary Team. In recognition of his collegiate and NBA achievements, Barkley's number 34 jersey was officially retired by Auburn University on March 3, 2001. In the same month, the Philadelphia 76ers also officially retired Barkley's number 34 jersey. On March 20, 2004, the Phoenix Suns honored Barkley as well by including him in the "Suns Ring of Honor". In recognition of his achievements as a player, Barkley was inducted into the Naismith Memorial Basketball Hall of Fame in 2006. In October 2021, as part of the NBA's 75th Anniversary, Barkley was honored as one of the 75 greatest players of all time by being named to the NBA's 75th Anniversary Team. To commemorate the NBA's 75th Anniversary The Athletic ranked their top 75 players of all time, and named Barkley as the 22nd greatest player in NBA history.

== NBA career statistics ==
Legend
GP	Games played	GS	Games started	MPG	Minutes per game
FG%	Field goal percentage	3P%	3-point field goal percentage	FT%	Free throw percentage
RPG	Rebounds per game	APG	Assists per game	SPG	Steals per game
BPG	Blocks per game	PPG	Points per game	**Bold**	Career high
*	Led the league

=== Regular season ===
Year	Team	GP	GS	MPG	FG%	3P%	FT%	RPG	APG	SPG	BPG	PPG
1984–85	Philadelphia	**82**	60	28.6	.545	.167	.733	8.6	1.9	1.2	1.0	14.0
1985–86	Philadelphia	80	80	36.9	.572	.227	.685	12.8	3.9	**2.2**	**1.6**	20.0
1986–87	Philadelphia	68	62	**40.3**	.594	.202	.761	**14.6***	4.9	1.8	1.5	23.0
1987–88	Philadelphia	80	80	39.6	.587	.280	.751	11.9	3.2	1.3	1.3	**28.3**
1988–89	Philadelphia	79	79	39.1	.579	.216	.753	12.5	4.1	1.6	.9	25.8
1989–90	Philadelphia	79	79	39.1	**.600**	.217	.749	11.5	3.9	1.9	.6	25.2
1990–91	Philadelphia	67	67	37.3	.570	.284	.722	10.1	4.2	1.6	.5	27.6
1991–92	Philadelphia	75	75	38.4	.552	.234	.695	11.1	4.1	1.8	.6	23.1
1992–93	Phoenix	76	76	37.6	.520	.305	.765	12.2	**5.1**	1.6	1.0	25.6
1993–94	Phoenix	65	65	35.4	.495	.270	.704	11.2	4.6	1.6	.6	21.6
1994–95	Phoenix	68	68	35.0	.486	**.338**	.748	11.1	4.1	1.6	.7	23.0
1995–96	Phoenix	71	71	37.1	.500	.280	**.777**	11.6	3.7	1.6	.8	23.2
1996–97	Houston	53	53	37.9	.484	.283	.694	13.5	4.7	1.3	.5	19.2
1997–98	Houston	68	41	33.0	.485	.214	.746	11.7	3.2	1.0	.4	15.2
1998–99	Houston	42	40	36.3	.478	.160	.719	12.3	4.6	1.0	.3	16.1
1999–00	Houston	20	18	31.0	.477	.231	.645	10.5	3.2	.7	.2	14.5
Career		1,073	1,012	36.7	.541	.266	.735	11.7	3.9	1.5	.8	22.1
All-Star		11	7	23.2	.495	.250	.625	6.7	1.8	1.3	.4	12.6

=== Playoffs ===
Year	Team	GP	GS	MPG	FG%	3P%	FT%	RPG	APG	SPG	BPG	PPG
1985	Philadelphia	13	2	31.4	.540	**.667**	.733	11.1	2.0	1.8	1.2	14.9
1986	Philadelphia	12	12	41.4	.578	.067	.695	**15.8**	5.6	2.3	1.3	25.0
1987	Philadelphia	5	5	42.0	.573	.125	**.800**	12.6	2.4	.8	**1.6**	24.6
1989	Philadelphia	3	3	**45.0**	**.644**	.200	.710	11.7	5.3	1.7	.7	27.0
1990	Philadelphia	10	10	41.9	.543	.333	.602	15.5	4.3	.8	.7	24.7
1991	Philadelphia	8	8	40.8	.592	.100	.653	10.5	**6.0**	1.9	.4	24.9
1993	Phoenix	**24**	**24**	42.8	.477	.222	.771	13.6	4.3	1.6	1.0	26.6
1994	Phoenix	10	10	42.5	.509	.350	.764	13.0	4.8	**2.5**	.9	**27.6**
1995	Phoenix	10	10	39.0	.500	.257	.733	13.4	3.2	1.3	1.1	25.7
1996	Phoenix	4	4	41.0	.443	.250	.787	13.5	3.8	1.0	1.0	25.5
1997	Houston	16	16	37.8	.434	.289	.769	12.0	3.4	1.2	.4	17.9
1998	Houston	4	0	21.8	.522	.000	.571	5.3	1.0	1.3	.0	9.0
1999	Houston	4	4	39.3	.529	.286	.667	13.8	3.8	1.5	.5	23.5
Career		123	108	39.4	.513	.255	.717	12.9	3.9	1.6	.9	23.0

== NBA records ==
=== Regular season ===
Most offensive rebounds in a half: 13, Philadelphia 76ers vs. New York Knicks, March 4, 1987

Most offensive rebounds in a quarter: 11, Philadelphia 76ers vs. New York Knicks, March 4, 1987

- Tied with Larry Smith (Golden State Warriors vs. Denver Nuggets, March 23, 1986)

Shortest player to lead the league in rebounds: at 6’6"

=== Playoffs ===
Most free throws made in a half: 19, Phoenix Suns vs. Seattle SuperSonics, June 5, 1993

Most free throw attempts in a 7-game series: 100, Philadelphia 76ers vs. Milwaukee Bucks, 1986 Eastern Conference Semi-finals

Most turnovers in a 7-game series: 37, Philadelphia 76ers vs. Milwaukee Bucks, 1986 Eastern Conference Semi-finals

== Television ==
=== Sports analyst ===
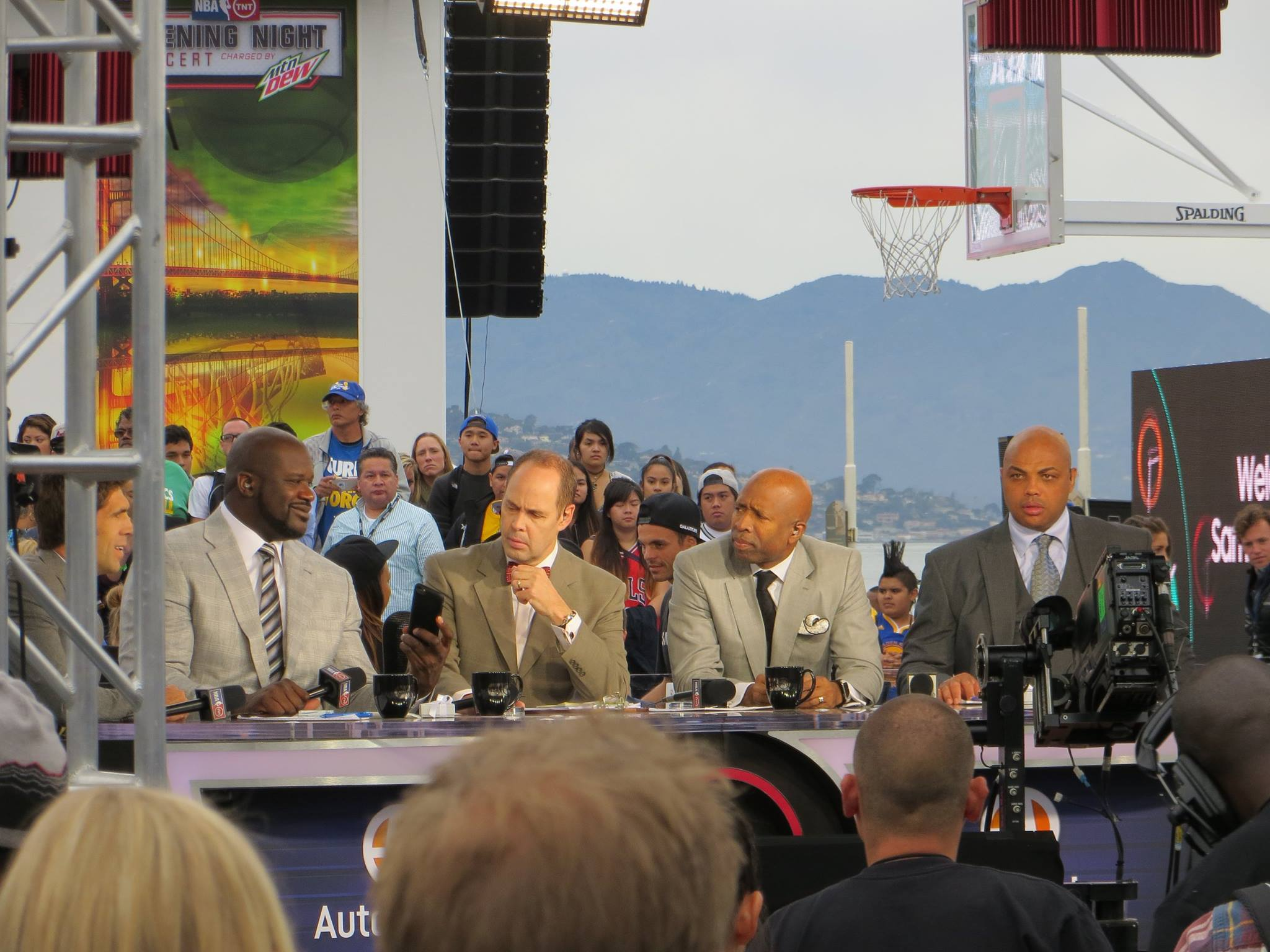
Barkley on Inside the NBA on location at San Francisco's Pier 43 for the NBA season opening day in late October 2015.

Since 2000, Barkley has served as a studio analyst for Turner Network Television (TNT). He appears on the network's NBA coverage during pre-game and halftime shows, in addition to special NBA events. He also occasionally works as an onsite game analyst. He is part of the crew on Inside the NBA, a post-game show during which Barkley, Ernie Johnson Jr., Kenny Smith and Shaquille O'Neal recap and comment on NBA games that have occurred during the day and also on general NBA affairs. Barkley has won five Sports Emmy Awards for "Outstanding Studio Analyst" for his work on TNT.

During the broadcast of a game, in which Barkley was courtside with Marv Albert, Barkley poked fun at NBA official Dick Bavetta's age. Albert replied to Barkley, "I believe Dick would beat you in a footrace." In response to that remark, Barkley went on to challenge Bavetta to a race at the 2007 NBA All-Star Weekend for $5,000. The winner was to choose a charity to which the money would be donated. The NBA agreed to pitch in an additional $50,000, and TNT threw in $25,000. The pair raced for three and a half lengths of the basketball court until Barkley ultimately won. After the event, the two kissed in a show of good sportsmanship.

Barkley was also known for being the first-ever celebrity guest picker for College GameDay, in 2004.

Since 2011, Barkley has served as a studio analyst for the joint coverage of the NCAA Division I men's basketball tournament between Turner Sports and CBS. Barkley has broadcast every Final Four since 2011.

He also served as a guest commentator for NBC's coverage of the NFL Wild Card playoffs on January 7, 2012; the same night he hosted Saturday Night Live, which is taped next door to the Football Night in America studio in Manhattan's GE Building.

Barkley announced in November 2012 that he was contemplating retirement from broadcasting. "[N]ow I'm like, 'Dude, you have been doing this for 13 years and if I make it to the end of the contract, it will be 17 years.' Seventeen years is a long time. It's a lifetime in broadcasting. I personally have to figure out the next challenge for me", he said. After repeating that he planned to retire in 2016, he signed another contract with Turner Sports. He later stated that he wanted to retire when he turned 60 in 2023.

In October 2022, Barkley signed a 10-year contract extension with Warner Bros. Discovery Sports, owner of TNT, to remain as an analyst on Inside the NBA.

In June 2024, Barkley also was a guest of Game 2 of the 2024 Stanley Cup Final as a Studio analyst broadcast by ABC, and produced by ESPN.

In June 2024, Barkley announced his intention to retire from television following the conclusion of the 2024–25 NBA season. He later reversed this decision in August, deciding to stay with TNT Sports on his ten-year, $210 million contract.

In 2025, Inside the NBA moved to ESPN.

=== Other television work ===
From 2002 to 2003, Barkley hosted a sports and general topics talk show with guests on TNT called Listen Up! Charles Barkley with Ernie Johnson. In July 2016, it was announced that Barkley would host a six-episode unscripted show called The Race Card. The show was renamed to American Race, and premiered on TNT on May 11, 2017.

In the fall of 2023, Barkley would begin co-hosting a news discussion program called King Charles alongside Gayle King on CNN. It was a limited-run series that aired on Wednesdays at 10pm. King Charles ended in April the following year.

== Personal life ==
A DNA test read by George Lopez on Lopez Tonight revealed Barkley's ancestry to be of 14% Native American, 11% European, and 75% African descent.

=== Marriage and family ===
Barkley and Maureen Blumhardt reportedly first met in the mid to late 1980s when Barkley was playing for the Philadelphia 76ers. They got married in 1989. Barkley and Maureen reside in Scottsdale, Arizona. His wife, an honorary member of the Phoenix-based Fresh Start Women's Foundation organization, largely avoids publicity and rarely makes public appearances with Barkley. During Barkley's playing career, Blumhardt would often attend his games unrecognized. Their daughter was born in 1989.

=== Gambling ===
Barkley is known for his compulsive gambling. In a 2007 interview with ESPN's Trey Wingo, Barkley revealed that he had lost approximately $10 million through gambling. In addition, he also admitted to losing $2.5 million "in a six-hour period" while playing blackjack. Although Barkley openly admits to his problem, he claims it is not serious since he can afford to support the habit. When approached by fellow TNT broadcaster Ernie Johnson about the issue, Barkley replied, "It's not a problem. If you're a drug addict or an alcoholic, those are problems. I gamble for too much money. As long as I can continue to do it I don't think it's a problem. Do I think it's a bad habit? Yes, I think it's a bad habit. Am I going to continue to do it? Yes, I'm going to continue to do it."

Despite suffering big losses, Barkley also claims to have won on several occasions. During a trip to Las Vegas, he claims to have won $700,000 from playing blackjack and betting on the Indianapolis Colts to defeat the Chicago Bears in Super Bowl XLI. He went on to state, however, "No matter how much I win, it ain't a lot. It's only a lot when I lose. And you always lose. I think it's fun, I think it's exciting. I'm gonna continue to do it, but I have to get to a point where I don't try to break the casino 'cause you never can."

In May 2008, the Wynn Las Vegas casino filed a civil complaint against Barkley, alleging that he failed to pay a $400,000 debt stemming from October 2007. Barkley responded by taking blame for letting time lapse on the repayment of the debt and promptly paid the casino. After repaying his debt, Barkley stated during a pregame show on TNT, "I've got to stop gambling [...] I am not going to gamble anymore. For right now, the next year or two, I'm not going to gamble [...] Just because I can afford to lose money doesn't mean I should do it."

=== Golf ===
Barkley began playing golf during his NBA career, later staying with the sport as it was a way to remain in competition after his basketball career ended. He is a regular competitor at the American Century Championship pro-am tournament, regularly finishing near the bottom of the leaderboard. He is widely regarded as a poor golfer with a particularly bad swing; he later underwent training to improve his swing, which led to an improved performance in the 2021 American Century Championship.

Barkley participated in Champions for Change, the third iteration of The Match. As part of a team with Phil Mickelson, Barkley pulled off a major upset defeating Peyton Manning and Stephen Curry by a score of 4–3.

=== Politics ===
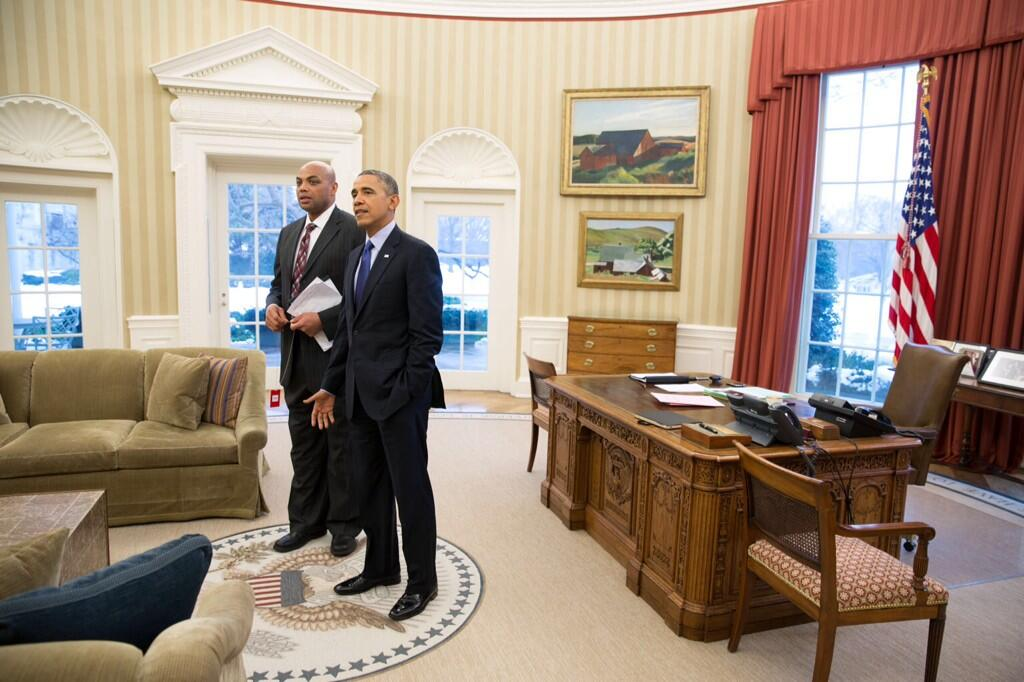
Barkley with President Barack Obama at the White House

Barkley spoke for many years of his Republican Party affiliation. In 1995, he considered running as a Republican candidate for Alabama's governorship in the 1998 election. However, in 2006, he altered his political stance, stating "I was a Republican until they lost their minds." At a July 2006 meeting of the Southern Regional Conference of the National School Boards Association in Destin, Florida, Barkley lent credence to the idea of running for Governor of Alabama, stating:

I'm serious. I've got to get people to realize that the government is full of it. Republicans and Democrats want to argue over stuff that's not important, like gay marriage or the war in Iraq or illegal immigration... When I run—if I run—we're going to talk about real issues like improving our schools, cleaning up our neighborhoods of drugs and crime and making Alabama a better place for all people.

In September 2006, Barkley once again reiterated his desire to run for governor. He noted, "I can't run until 2014 ... I have to live there for seven years, so I'm looking for a house there as we speak." In July 2007, he made a video declaring his support for Barack Obama in the 2008 presidential election. In September 2007, during a broadcast on Monday Night Football, Barkley announced that he bought a house in Alabama to satisfy residency requirements for a 2014 campaign for governor. In addition, Barkley declared himself an independent and not a Democrat as previously reported. "The Republicans are full of it", Barkley said, "The Democrats are a little less full of it."

In February 2008, Barkley announced that he would be running for Governor of Alabama in 2014 as an independent. On October 27, 2008, he officially announced his candidacy for Governor of Alabama in an interview with CNN, stating that he planned to run in the 2014 election cycle, but he began to back off the idea in a November 24, 2009, interview on The Jay Leno Show. In 2010, he confirmed that he was not running in 2014. In August 2015, Barkley announced his support for Republican John Kasich in the 2016 presidential election. On Lance Armstrong's podcast in 2019, he confirmed that he would not be running for office.

Barkley supports LGBT rights. In 2006, he told Fox Sports: "I'm a big advocate of gay marriage. If they want to get married, God bless them." Speaking to Wolf Blitzer on CNN two years later, he said: "Every time I hear the word 'conservative,' it makes me sick to my stomach, because they're really just fake Christians, as I call them. That's all they are. ... I think they want to be judge and jury. Like, I'm for gay marriage. It's none of my business if gay people want to get married. I'm pro-choice. And I think these Christians, first of all, they're not supposed to judge other people. But they're the most hypocritical judge of people we have in the country. And it bugs the hell out of me. They act like they're Christians. They're not forgiving at all." During a 2011 Martin Luther King Jr. Day double-header on TNT, Barkley responded to a statement made by Dr. King's daughter Bernice, by saying, "People try to make it about black and white. [But] he talked about equality for every man, every woman. We have a thing going on now, people discriminating against homosexuality in this country. I love the homosexuality [sic] people. God bless the gay people. They are great people." Barkley has stated on several occasions that he has played with multiple gay players. In 2013, in response to Celtics player Jason Collins coming out, Barkley stated, “I think anybody who thinks they never played with a gay player is an idiot." In 2022, a video surfaced of Barkley speaking at an event where he made comments vehemently in favor of the LGBTQ community: "I want to say this. If you're gay and transgender, I love you. And if anybody gives you shit, you tell them Charles said 'fuck you.'" He spoke out against the 2023 Bud Light boycott in the United States, mainly by conservatives who oppose the brand's endorsements by transgender actress Dylan Mulvaney; he said that he would buy Bud Light for the crowd at a celebrity golf tournament in Lake Tahoe, and condemned the boycotters as "rednecks".

Commenting on the Ferguson unrest, Barkley called the Ferguson looters "scumbags", praised the police officers who work in black neighborhoods, and said that he supports the decision made by the grand jury not to indict officer Darren Wilson in the Michael Brown shooting. Previously, in 2013, Barkley expressed his agreement with the acquittal of George Zimmerman in the Trayvon Martin shooting.

In 2014, when Barkley was asked about the rumor that Seattle Seahawks quarterback Russell Wilson was being accused for not being "black enough" on the radio show Afternoons with Anthony and Rob Ellis, he said:

Unfortunately, as I tell my white friends, we as black people, we're never going to be successful, not because of you white people, but because of other black people. When you're black, you have to deal with so much crap in your life from other black people. It's a dirty, dark secret; I'm glad it's coming out. One of the reasons we're never going to be successful as a whole, because of other black people. And for some reason we are brainwashed to think, if you're not a thug or an idiot, you're not black enough. If you go to school, make good grades, speak intelligently, and don't break the law, you're not a good black person. And it's a dirty, dark secret. There are a lot of black people who are unintelligent, who don't have success. It's best to knock a successful black person down because they're intelligent, they speak well, they do well in school, and they're successful [...] We're the only ethnic group who say, 'Hey, if you go to jail, it gives you street cred.' It's just typical BS that goes on when you're black, man.

Barkley has also been known as a critic of President Donald Trump from as early as his Republican nomination in the 2016 U.S. presidential election. Before Trump won the Republican primaries that year, Barkley stated his disgust towards the words and messages that Trump was promoting throughout the presidential race. In September 2017, when President Trump called out former San Francisco 49ers quarterback Colin Kaepernick for his kneeling during the U.S. National Anthem during the 2016 NFL season, Barkley expressed his complete disappointment in President Trump (however, Barkley has stated that he does not support athletes kneeling during the National Anthem as a form of protest). In December 2017, Barkley mocked President Trump's tax bill, stating "Thank you Republicans, I knew I could always count on y'all to take care of us rich people, us one percenters. Sorry, poor people. I'm hoping for y'all, but y'all ain't got no chance."

In his response to the controversy generated by the removal of Confederate monuments as highlighted by the August 2017 Unite the Right rally in Charlottesville, Virginia, Barkley stated:

I've never thought about those statues a day in my life. I think if you asked most black people to be honest, they ain't thought a day in their life about those stupid statues. What we as black people need to do: We need to worry about getting our education, we need to stop killing each other, we need to try to find a way to have more economic opportunity and things like that. Those things are important and significant. You know, I'm wasting time and energy [if I'm] screaming at a neo-Nazi, or [saying] 'Man, you've got to take this statue down.'

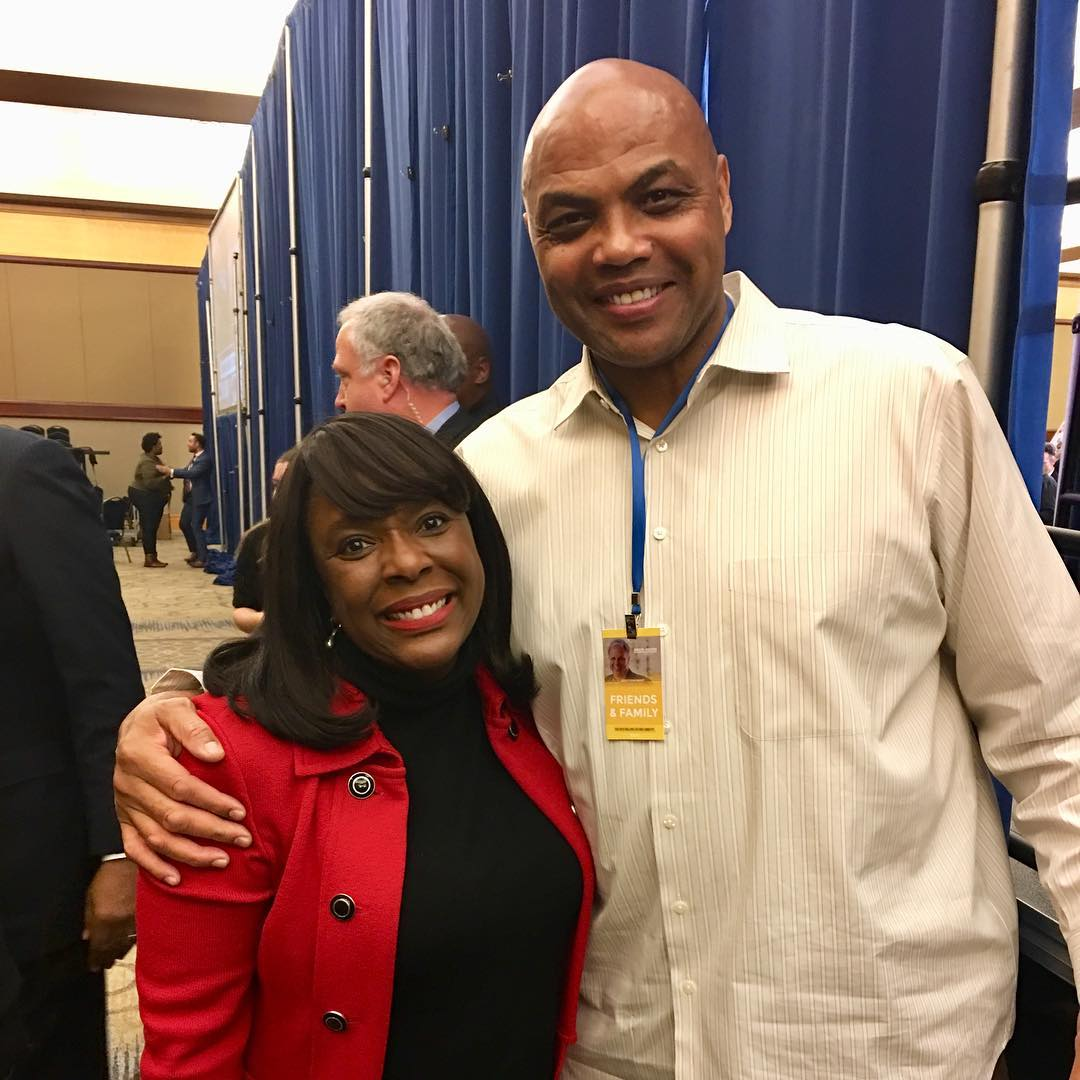
Congresswoman Terri Sewell and Charles Barkley at Doug Jones' election night party in 2017

Barkley supported Democrat Doug Jones in the 2017 United States Senate special election in Alabama. During Alabama's Senate election, Barkley argued that Jones' competitor, Roy Moore, should have been disqualified: "How can you have a guy who's running with a white separatist running for a political office?"

While Barkley supports police and prison reforms, he spoke out against defunding the police in 2020, saying "Who are black people supposed to call? The Ghostbusters?". After the killing of Breonna Taylor, Barkley said that "I feel sad that this young lady lost her life.", but added that "we do have to take into account that her boyfriend shot at the cops and shot a cop.", making her situation not "like George Floyd or Ahmaud Arbery".

Also in 2020, Barkley expressed concern that sports were becoming too political, saying that "My concern is turning this into a circus instead of trying to do some good stuff." and that "The last thing they want to do is turn on the television and hear arguments all the time."

During the COVID-19 pandemic in 2020, Barkley said that "You'd have to be a fool to think your kids will be safe in school right now", but argued that keeping children at home would widen the gap between the rich and the poor. He also expressed optimism about the NBA's planned restart to the 2019–2020 season in the NBA bubble, but worried about some players testing positive for COVID-19.

In an interview with Brandon 'Scoop B' Robinson on the Scoop B Radio podcast, Barkley said if he ruled the world for one day, he would get rid of both Republicans and Democrats because "They're both awful", adding: "They fight all of the time like little kids."

=== Books ===
In 1991, Barkley and sportswriter Roy S. Johnson collaborated on the autobiographical work Outrageous. Editorial choices made by Johnson in the book led to Barkley famously quipping that he had been misquoted in his own autobiography. In 2000, Barkley wrote the foreword for Sports Illustrated columnist Rick Reilly's book The Life of Reilly. In it, Barkley quipped, "Of all the people in sports I'd like to throw through a plate glass window, Reilly's not one of them. It's a shame though, skinny white boys look real aerodynamic." In 2002, Barkley released the book I May Be Wrong, But I Doubt It, which included editing and commentary by close friend Michael Wilbon. Three years later, Barkley released Who's Afraid of a Large Black Man?, which is a collection of interviews with leading figures in entertainment, business, sports, and government. Michael Wilbon also contributed to this book and was present at many of the interviews.

=== Acting ===
He played himself in the 1996 film Space Jam. He made a brief appearance in the TV series Suits, in episode 3 of the fifth season. He was seen taking pictures with a client that was stolen from Jack Soloff, by the great Harvey Specter. Charles also appeared in the eighth season of Modern Family. He also voices animated versions of himself in Clerks: The Animated Series and We Bare Bears. In 2019, he appeared in "The Piña Colada Song" episode of The Goldbergs as a gym teacher and alien conspiracy theorist briefly trained as a prospective replacement for the departing Coach Mellor. Barkley hosted Saturday Night Live on four separate occasions between 1993 and 2018.

=== DUI conviction ===
On December 31, 2008, Barkley was pulled over in Scottsdale for running a stop sign. The officer smelled alcohol on Barkley's breath and proceeded to administer field sobriety tests, which he failed. He was arrested on drunk driving charges and had his vehicle impounded. Barkley refused to submit a breath test and was given a blood test. He was then cited and released. Gilbert police noted Barkley was cooperative and respectful during the entire incident, adding that he was treated no differently than anyone arrested on DUI charges. The police report of the incident stated that Barkley told the police he was in a hurry to receive oral sex from his female passenger when he ran through a stop sign early Wednesday. Test results released by the police showed that Barkley had a blood-alcohol level at .149, nearly twice the legal limit of .08 in Arizona. Two months after his arrest, Barkley pleaded guilty to two DUI-related counts and one count of running a red light. He was sentenced to ten days in jail and fined $2,000. The sentence was later reduced to three days after Barkley entered an alcohol treatment program.

As part of the fallout of his arrest, Barkley took a two-month hiatus from his commentating duties for TNT. During his absence, T-Mobile elected not to air previously scheduled ads that featured Barkley. On February 19, 2009, Barkley returned to TNT and spent the first segment of the NBA pregame show discussing the incident and his experiences. Shortly after his return, T-Mobile once again began airing ads featuring Barkley.

=== WeightWatchers ===
In 2011, Barkley became a spokesman for WeightWatchers, promoting their "Lose Like a Man" program and appearing in both television and online ads.

=== Comment on Cardi B ===
In June 2026, during a halftime performance by Cardi B at Game 3 of the 2026 NBA Finals at Madison Square Garden, Barkley remarked "I don't know if those are B's. They might be Cardi D's. I'm pretty sure those aren't B's... She's got the wrong initials", in an apparent reference to the singer's breasts. The comments sparked controversy and were widely criticised as sexist.

== See also ==
- Barkley Shut Up and Jam!, a 1994 video game
- Barkley Shut Up and Jam 2, a 1995 video game
- Barkley, Shut Up and Jam: Gaiden, a 2008 video game
- List of members of the Basketball Hall of Fame
- List of NBA career scoring leaders
- List of NBA career rebounding leaders
- List of NBA career steals leaders
- List of NBA career turnovers leaders
- List of NBA career personal fouls leaders
- List of NBA career field goal percentage leaders
- List of NBA career free throw scoring leaders
- List of NBA career minutes played leaders
- List of NBA career triple-double leaders
- List of NBA career playoff rebounding leaders
- List of NBA career playoff steals leaders
- List of NBA career playoff free throw scoring leaders
- List of NBA career playoff triple-double leaders
- List of NBA annual rebounding leaders
- List of NBA single-game playoff scoring leaders
- List of NBA single-game rebounding leaders
- List of NBA single-season rebounding leaders
- Godzilla vs. Charles Barkley
- Gnarls Barkley

== Bibliography ==
- Barkley, Charles; Michael Wilbon (2002). I May Be Wrong but I Doubt It. Random House. ISBN 0-375-50883-X.
- Barkley, Charles; Michael Wilbon (2005). Who's Afraid of a Large Black Man?. Penguin Press. ISBN 1-59420-042-4.
