= List of The Daily Show episodes (2001) =

- No. of episodes: 159

Release
- Original network: Comedy Central

Season chronology
- ← Previous; 2000 episodes Next → 2002 episodes

This is a list of episodes for The Daily Show with Jon Stewart in 2001. Dave Navarro was the scheduled guest for September 11. The episode was not aired following the September 11 attacks. Following the attacks The Daily Show went on hiatus and returned on September 20 with a clip show, before returning to its regular format on September 24.

== 2001 ==
=== January ===
Number	Date	Guest	Promotion
712	January 9	Richard Lewis	The Other Great Depression
713	January 10	Vitamin C	Dracula 2000 and More
714	January 11	Julia Stiles	Save the Last Dance
715	January 15	Willem Dafoe	Shadow of the Vampire
716	January 16	Tim Robbins	Antitrust
717	January 17	Sam Donaldson	This Week
718	January 18	Lynn Whitfield	A Girl Thing
719	January 22	Bill O'Reilly	The O'Reilly Factor: The Book
720	January 23	Matthew McConaughey	The Wedding Planner
721	January 24 †	Terry Bradshaw	Competition
722	January 25	Topher Grace	Traffic
723	January 29	David Boreanaz	Valentine
724	January 30	Dyan Cannon	Three Sisters
725	January 31	James Van Der Beek	Texas Rangers

=== February ===
Number	Date	Guest	Promotion
726	February 1	Tim Blake Nelson	O Brother, Where Art Thou?
727	February 12	Dave Grohl	There Is Nothing Left to Lose
728	February 13	Kermit the Frog	
729	February 14	Jessica Alba	Dark Angel
730	February 15	Wanda Sykes	Down to Earth
731	February 20†	Greg Germann	Down to Earth and Sweet November
732	February 21~¥	Chris Rock	Down to Earth
733	February 22†	Kelly Ripa	Live! with Regis and Kelly
734	February 26↔	Ted Danson	Becker
735	February 27‡↔	Joe Pantoliano	Memento
736	February 28	Heather Locklear	Spin City

=== March ===
Number	Date	Guest	Promotion
737	March 1	Warren Christopher	Chances of a Lifetime
738	March 5	Martin Short	Primetime Glick
739	March 6	Ed Burns	15 Minutes
740	March 7	Carmen Electra	Get Over It
741	March 8	Javier Bardem	Before Night Falls
742	March 19	Chris Meloni	Oz
743	March 20	Mary Stuart Masterson	Kate Brasher
744	March 21	Jeff Varner	Survivor: The Australian Outback
745	March 22	Denis Leary	The Job
746	March 26†	Richard Roeper	74th Academy Awards
747	March 27†~	Richard Lewis	Live from HELL
748	March 28~	Mark Harmon	And Never Let Her Go
749	March 29~¥	Jennifer Love Hewitt	Heartbreakers

=== April ===
Number	Date	Guest	Promotion
750	April 2~	Lisa Ling	The View and The Boston Marathon
751	April 3†	Amy Sedaris	The Book of Liz
752	April 4~	D.L. Hughley	The Brothers
753	April 5†	Steven Weber	Club Land
754	April 9	Paul Reubens	Blow
755	April 10	Bob Costas	Fair Ball
756	April 11	Damon Wayans	My Wife and Kids
757	April 12	Brittany Daniel	Joe Dirt
758	April 23	Don Hewitt	60 Minutes
759	April 24	Rachael Leigh Cook	Josie and the Pussycats
760	April 25	Tom Green	Freddy Got Fingered
761	April 26	Tom Cavanagh	Ed
762	April 30	Eric McCormack	The Music Man

=== May ===
Number	Date	Guest	Promotion
763	May 1~	Dominic Chianese	The Sopranos
764	May 2†	No guest	
765	May 3†	Robert Patrick	The X-Files
766	May 7	Chris Robinson	The Black Crowes
767	May 8	James Van Der Beek	Dawson's Creek
768	May 9	Richie Sambora	Crush
769	May 10	Patricia Richardson	Blonde
770	May 14	Maura Tierney	ER (TV series)
771	May 15	Denise Quiñones	Miss Universe 2001
772	May 16	Heath Ledger	A Knight's Tale
773	May 17	Jerry Springer	Late Night with Jerry Springer
774	May 29	Richard Schiff	The West Wing
775	May 30	Bradley Whitford	The West Wing
776	May 31	Leah Remini	The King of Queens

=== June ===
Number	Date	Guest	Promotion
777	June 4	Jake Johannsen	
778	June 5	Richard Belzer	Law & Order: Special Victims Unit
779	June 6	Al Roker	Don't Make Me Stop This Car!
780	June 7	Bernie Mac	The Bernie Mac Show
781	June 11	Joe Queenan	Balsamic Dreams
782	June 12	Gene Simmons	KISS
783	June 13	David Duchovny	Evolution
784	June 14	Jeff Greenfield	Greenfield at Large
785	June 18	Martin Short	Primetime Glick
786	June 19	Michael Rapaport	Dr. Dolittle 2
787	June 20	Alec Baldwin	Pearl Harbor
788	June 21	Mýa	Atlantis: The Lost Empire
789	June 25	Sam Robards	A.I. Artificial Intelligence
790	June 26	Johnny Knoxville	Jackass
791	June 27	Jet Li	Kiss of the Dragon
792	June 28	Bridget Fonda	Kiss of the Dragon

=== July ===
Number	Date	Guest	Promotion
793	July 9	Sean Hayes	Cats & Dogs
794	July 10	Spice Girls	
795	July 11	James Woods	Final Fantasy: The Spirits Within
796	July 12	Vince Vaughn	Made
797	July 16	Jon Favreau	Made
798	July 17	Maria Bartiromo	Use the News
799	July 18	Edward Norton	The Score
800	July 19	Hank Azaria	America's Sweethearts
801	July 23	Larry Miller	The Princess Diaries
802	July 24	Paul Giamatti	Planet of the Apes
803	July 25	Joe Lieberman	
804	July 26	John McCain	
805	July 30	Jerri Manthey	September 2001 issue of Playboy
806	July 31	Peter Krause	Six Feet Under

=== August ===
Number	Date	Guest	Promotion
807	August 1	Jackie Chan	Rush Hour 2
808	August 2	Janeane Garofalo	Wet Hot American Summer
809	August 6	Andie MacDowell	Dinner with Friends
810	August 7	Joe Rogan	Fear Factor
811	August 8	Tara Reid	American Pie 2
812	August 9	Jason Biggs	American Pie 2
813	August 13	David Rakoff	Fraud
814	August 14	John Carpenter	Ghosts of Mars
815	August 15	Seth Green	Rat Race
816	August 16	Fabio	Bubble Boy
817	August 20	Cuba Gooding Jr.	Rat Race
818	August 21	Griffin Dunne	Lisa Picard Is Famous
819	August 22	Will Ferrell	Jay and Silent Bob Strike Back
820	August 23	Kevin Smith	Jay and Silent Bob Strike Back

=== September ===
Number	Date	Guest	Promotion
821	September 10	They Might Be Giants	Mink Car
	September 11*	Dave Navarro	probably would have been Trust No One
822	September 20		(post-9/11 clip show)
823	September 24	Frank Rich	
824	September 25	Aaron Brown	
825	September 26	Jeff Greenfield	Oh, Waiter, One Order of Crow!
826	September 27	Tenacious D	Tenacious D (album)

* Episode cancelled.

=== October ===
Number	Date	Guest	Promotion
827	October 1	Kelsey Grammer	Frasier
828	October 2	James Belushi	According to Jim
829	October 3	Stephen S. Morse	
830	October 4	Kate Beckinsale	Serendipity
831	October 9	Owen Wilson	Zoolander
832	October 10	Jeremy Piven	Serendipity
833	October 11	John Miller	
834	October 15	Emeril Lagasse	Emeril
835	October 16	Lorraine Bracco	Riding in Cars with Boys
836	October 17	Snoop Dogg	Bones
837	October 18	Fareed Zakaria	Newsweek
838	October 22	Lance Bass	On the Line
839	October 23	Don Dahler	ABC News
840	October 24	Greta Van Susteren	The Point
841	October 25	Jeff Bridges	K-PAX
842	October 30	Rob Morrow	Maze
843	October 31	Richard Holbrooke	

=== November ===
Number	Date	Guest	Promotion
844	November 1	Kevin Spacey	K-PAX
845	November 5	Paul Rudd	The Shape of Things
846	November 6	P. J. O'Rourke	The CEO of the SOFA
847	November 7	George Stephanopoulos	ABC News
848	November 8	Jennifer Saunders	Absolutely Fabulous
849	November 12	Steve Kroft	60 Minutes
850	November 13	Anne Robinson	The Weakest Link
851	November 14	Carson Daly	Total Request Live
852	November 15	John Stamos	Thieves
853	November 26	Edward Burns	Sidewalks of New York
854	November 27	Star Jones	The View
855	November 28	Jennifer Garner	Alias
856	November 29	David Halberstam	War in a Time of Peace

=== December ===
Number	Date	Guest	Promotion
857	December 3	Nadine Strossen	The ACLU
858	December 4	John Edward	Crossing Over with John Edward
859	December 5	Marg Helgenberger	CSI
860	December 6	Ted Danson	Becker
861	December 10	Stephen Colbert as Al Sharpton (Sharpton had been the scheduled guest)	N/A
862	December 11	Dave Gorman	Are You Dave Gorman?
863	December 12	Janeane Garofalo	The Independent
864	December 13	Tracey Ullman	Tracey Ullman's Visible Panty Lines
865	December 17	Elijah Wood	The Lord of the Rings
866	December 18	Peggy Noonan	When Character Was King
867	December 19	Gary Sinise	Imposter
868	December 20	Jamie Foxx	Ali

- This show did not air due to the September 11 attacks

† These episodes were hosted by Stephen Colbert.

~ This episode was hosted by Steve Carell.

¥ This episode was hosted by Nancy Walls.

↔ This episode was hosted by Vance DeGeneres.

‡ This episode was hosted by Mo Rocca.
