= List of The Daily Show episodes (1999) =

- No. of episodes: 160

Release
- Original network: Comedy Central

Season chronology
- ← Previous; 1998 episodes Next → 2000 episodes

This is a list of episodes for The Daily Show with Jon Stewart in 1999, this was the first year to be hosted by Jon Stewart.

== 1999 ==
=== January ===
No.	Date	Guest	Promotion
387	January 11	Michael J. Fox	Spin City
388	January 12	Sandra Bernhard	I'm Still Here... Damn It! and May I Kiss You On The Lips, Miss Sandra?
389	January 13	Tracey Ullman	Tracey Takes On...
390	January 14	Gillian Anderson	The X-Files and Playing by Heart
391	January 18	David Alan Grier	A Saintly Switch and The 60's
392	January 19	William Baldwin	Virus
393	January 20	Michael Stipe	Up (R.E.M. album)
394	January 21	Carmen Electra	Hyperion Bay
395	January 25	Matthew Lillard	Dead Man's Curve
396	January 26	David Cross	The Pride is Back
397	January 27	Yasmine Bleeth	Nash Bridges
398	January 28	D. L. Hughley	The Hughleys

=== February ===
No.	Date	Guest	Promotion
399	February 1	George Carlin	You Are All Diseased
400	February 2	Dave Foley	NewsRadio
401	February 3	Kellie Martin	ER
402	February 4	Jerry O'Connell	The '60s
403	February 8	Melissa Gilbert	Murder at 75 Birch
404	February 9	Brendan Fraser	Blast from the Past
405	February 10	Pamela Anderson, Natalie Raitano, Molly Culver	V.I.P.
406	February 11	Daniel Stern	Dilbert
407	February 16	Melina Kanakaredes	Providence
408	February 17	Ed McMahon	Suddenly Susan
409	February 18	Mike Judge	Office Space

=== March ===
No.	Date	Guest	Promotion
410	March 1	John Tesh	One World
411	March 2	Eric McCormack	Will & Grace
412	March 3	Jeri Ryan	Star Trek: Voyager
413	March 4	Ryan Phillippe	Cruel Intentions
414	March 8	Ian McKellen	Gods and Monsters
415	March 9	Jon Voight	Noah's Ark
416	March 10	Sammy Hagar	Album Red Voodoo
417	March 11	Hootie & the Blowfish, Billy Crystal	Album Musical Chairs
418	March 15	Peter Krause	Sports Night
419	March 16	Chris Isaak	Album Speak of the Devil
420	March 17	Frank DeCaro's Oscar Special, John Larroquette	Payne
421	March 18	Joseph Gordon-Levitt	10 Things I Hate About You
422	March 22	Jennifer Grey	TV series It's Like, You Know...
423	March 23	Norm Macdonald	The Norm Show
424	March 24	Sandra Bullock	Forces of Nature
425	March 25	Janine Turner	Fatal Error
426	March 29	Ron Howard	EDtv
427	March 30	Omar Epps	The Mod Squad
428	March 31	Diane Lane	A Walk on the Moon

=== April ===
No.	Date	Guest	Promotion
429	April 1	Stephen Baldwin	Friends & Lovers
430	April 12	Ernie Hudson	Michael Jordan: An American Hero
431	April 13	Josh Charles	Sports Night
432	April 14	Jackie Chan	Twin Dragons
433	April 15	Marlee Matlin	Freak City
434	April 19	Sharon Lawrence	NYPD Blue
435	April 20	Rob Estes	Melrose Place Finale
436	April 21	Angelina Jolie	Pushing Tin
437	April 22	David Spade	Lost & Found
438	April 26	Seth Green	Austin Powers 2 and Idle Hands
439	April 27	Sheryl Lee Ralph	Producer of Divas Simply Singing
440	April 28	Chris Robinson	
441	April 29	Joy Behar	Book Joy Shtick and The View

=== May ===
No.	Date	Guest	Promotion
442	May 10	Thomas Gibson	Dharma & Greg
443	May 11	Paula Cale	Providence
444	May 12	Ted Danson	Becker
445	May 13	Esai Morales	Atomic Train
446	May 17	Jane Seymour	Dr. Quinn, Medicine Woman
447	May 18	Robert Schimmel	
448	May 19	Camryn Manheim	Book "Wake Up, I'm Fat!"
449	May 20	Ray Romano	Everybody Loves Raymond
450	May 24	Patricia Richardson	Home Improvement
451	May 25	Suzanne Somers	Book "Suzanne Somers' Get Skinny on Fabulous Food"
452	May 26	Natalie Portman	Star Wars: Episode I – The Phantom Menace
453	May 27	Jamie Foxx	Any Given Sunday

=== June ===
No.	Date	Guest	Promotion
454	June 7	Harry Connick Jr.	Album Come by Me
455	June 8	Caroline Rhea	Sabrina, the Teenage Witch
456	June 9	Damon Wayans	Book Bootleg
457	June 10	Timothy Hutton	The General's Daughter
458	June 14	Mike Myers	Austin Powers: The Spy Who Shagged Me
459	June 15	Rob Lowe	Austin Powers: The Spy Who Shagged Me
460	June 16	Mike Myers	Austin Powers: The Spy Who Shagged Me
461	June 17	Heather Graham	Austin Powers: The Spy Who Shagged Me
462	June 21	Felicity Huffman	Play "Boston Marriage" and Sports Night
463	June 22	Jimmy Kimmel	The Man Show
464	June 23	Adam Sandler	Big Daddy
465	June 24	Richard Belzer	Book "UFOs, JFK, and Elvis: Conspiracies You Don't Have to be Crazy to Believe"
466	June 28	Margaret Cho	Show "I'm the One That I Want"
467	June 29	Scott Wolf	Broadway show Side Man
468	June 30	Roseanne Barr	

=== July ===
No.	Date	Guest	Promotion
469	July 1	Rob Schneider	Big Daddy
470	July 12	Adam Arkin	Chicago Hope
471	July 13	Miss Piggy	Muppets From Space
472	July 14	John Leguizamo	Summer of Sam
473	July 15	Robert Klein	
474	July 19	Christa Miller	The Drew Carey Show
475	July 20	David Brenner	
476	July 21	Third Anniversary Special	
477	July 22	Joely Fisher	Inspector Gadget and Cabaret
478	July 26	Donny Osmond	Book "Life is just what you make it"
479	July 27	Wendie Malick	Just Shoot Me!
480	July 28	Vince Neil	
481	July 29	Janeane Garofalo	Mystery Men

=== August ===
No.	Date	Guest	Promotion
482	August 2	Bebe Neuwirth	Summer of Sam
483	August 3	Garry Marshall	Runaway Bride
484	August 4	Denis Leary	Thomas Crown Affair
485	August 5	Jeffrey Tambor	Teaching Mrs. Tingle
486	August 9	Dave Foley	Dick
487	August 10	Dom Irrera	
488	August 11	Pierce Brosnan	Thomas Crown Affair
489	August 12	Eduardo Sanchez and Daniel Myrick	The Blair Witch Project
490	August 16	Carson Daly	
491	August 17	Molly Ringwald	Teaching Mrs. Tingle
492	August 18	Sarah Jessica Parker	Sex and the City
493	August 19	French Stewart	Love Stinks
494	August 23	Cheryl Ladd	A Dog of Flanders
495	August 24	LL Cool J	In Too Deep
496	August 25	Dwight Yoakam	
497	August 26	Nia Long	
498	August 30	The Daily Show Summer Spectacular	

=== September ===
No.	Date	Guest	Promotion
499	September 13	Elayne Boosler	
500	September 14	Tom Green	First TDS broadcast in Canada
501	September 15	Jason Priestley	
502	September 16	David Cross	David Cross: The Pride Is Back
503	September 20	Andy Richter	
504	September 21	Donny Osmond, Marie Osmond	
505	September 22	Dave Chappelle	
506	September 23	Steve Zahn	
507	September 27	Norm Macdonald	
508	September 28	Melissa Joan Hart	Drive Me Crazy
509	September 29	Richard Lewis	
510	September 30	Bruce McCulloch and Mark McKinney	

=== October ===
No.	Date	Guest	Promotion
511	October 4	Greg Proops	
512	October 5	Maury Povich	
513	October 6	Brooke Shields	
514	October 7	Molly Shannon	Superstar
515	October 18	Rebecca Gayheart	
516	October 19	Steven Wright	
517	October 20	Amy Brenneman	Judging Amy
518	October 21	Melissa Gilbert	
519	October 25	Cathy Moriarty	Crazy in Alabama
520	October 26	Louie Anderson	Family Feud
521	October 27	Sarah Michelle Gellar	
522	October 28	Melanie C	Northern Star

=== November ===
No.	Date	Guest	Promotion
523	November 1	Chris O'Donnell	The Bachelor
524	November 2	Jennifer Love Hewitt	Time of Your Life
525	November 3	Dave Grohl	
526	November 4	Roshumba Williams	
527	November 8	Kellie Martin	
528	November 9	Kathy Griffin	
529	November 15	Christina Ricci	Sleepy Hollow
530	November 16	Tori Amos	To Venus And Back
531	November 17	Yasmine Bleeth	
532	November 18	Bill Maher	
533	November 29	Goo Goo Dolls	
534	November 30	Stephen Rea	The End of the Affair

=== December ===
No.	Date	Guest	Promotion
535	December 1	Laura San Giacomo	
536	December 2	Michael Boatman	
537	December 6	Paul Rudd	
538	December 7	Senator Bob Dole, part 1	
539	December 8	Senator Bob Dole, part 2	
540	December 9	Rob Schneider	Deuce Bigalow: Male Gigolo
541	December 13	Joan Lunden	
542	December 14	Shannen Doherty	
543	December 15	Greatest Millennium Special, with house band They Might Be Giants	
544	December 16	George Carlin	
545	December 20	David Boreanaz	Angel TV series
546	December 21	Jewel	Joy - A Holiday Collection album
