= List of The Daily Show episodes (1996) =

Season chronology
- ← Previous; 1995 Next → 1997

This is a list of episodes for The Daily Show in 1996. It covers shows hosted by Craig Kilborn.

== 1996 ==
=== July ===
No.	Date	Guest	Promotion
1	July 22	John Hulme, Michael Wexler	Baked Potatoes: A pot smoker's guide to film and video
2	July 23	Mary Kay Place	Manny & Lo
3	July 24	Jon Cryer	The Pompatus of Love
4	July 25	Jackie Chan	Supercop
5	July 29	N/A	
6	July 30	Bobby Slayton	
7	July 31	Jamie Lee Curtis	House Arrest

=== August ===
No.	Date	Guest	Promotion
8	August 1	N/A	
9	August 5	Gordon Elliott	The Gordon Elliott Show
10	August 6	Engelbert Humperdinck	16 Most Requested Songs
11	August 7	Susan Norfleet	
12	August 8	Kevin Meaney	Rocko's Modern Life
13	August 12	Dennis Miller	Bordello of Blood
14	August 13	Henriette Mantel	A Very Brady Sequel
15	August 14	Phyllis Diller	The Bold and the Beautiful
16	August 15	Charlton Heston	Alaska
17	August 19	Edward Burns	She's the One
18	August 20	John Hulme, Michael Wexler	
19	August 21	Dave Attell	HBO Comedy Half-Hour
20	August 22	Mario Van Peebles	Solo

=== September ===
No.	Date	Guest	Promotion
21	September 9	Rolonda Watts	Rolonda
22	September 10	Eric Stoltz	Grace of My Heart
23	September 11	The Amazing Kreskin	
24	September 12	Jon Stewart	Jon Stewart: Unleavened
25	September 16	Robert Wuhl	Arli$$
26	September 17	Wink Martindale	Debt
27	September 18	Joan Rivers	
28	September 19	Jerry Springer	The Jerry Springer Show
29	September 24	Clea Lewis	The Rich Man's Wife
30	September 25	David Cross	Mr. Show with Bob and David
31	September 26	Dan Hedaya	The First Wives Club
32	September 30	Tom Rhodes	Mr. Rhodes

=== October ===
No.	Date	Guest	Promotion
33	October 1	Joey Slotnick	
34	October 2	Kathy Ireland	
35	October 3	Jennifer Tilly	Bound
36	October 7	Renée Taylor, Joseph Bologna	
37	October 8	María Conchita Alonso	
38	October 9	Jeff Stilson	
39	October 10	Frank DeCaro	
40	October 21	Jamie Foxx	The Jamie Foxx Show
41	October 22	Robert Schimmel	
42	October 23	Bill Murray	Larger Than Life
43	October 24	Janet Leigh	

=== November ===
No.	Date	Guest	Promotion
44	November 6	Arianna Huffington	
45	November 7	Richard Dean Anderson	
46	November 11	Brenda Vaccaro	The Mirror Has Two Faces
47	November 12	Kurt Loder	
48	November 13	Marilu Henner	
49	November 14	David Cross, Bob Odenkirk	
50	November 18	Michael Boatman	Spin City
51	November 19	Elayne Boosler	
52	November 20	James Doohan	
53	November 21	Mark Curry	

=== December ===
No.	Date	Guest	Promotion
54	December 2	Robin Leach	
55	December 3	Bobcat Goldthwait	
56	December 4	Tom Bergeron	
57	December 5	Julia Sweeney	
58	December 9	Bruce Davison	
59	December 10	Jim Breuer	Saturday Night Live
60	December 11	Richard Lewis	
61	December 12	Wes Craven	Scream
62	December 16	Rob Morrow	Mother
63	December 17	Robyn Lively	Savannah
64	December 18	Debbie Reynolds	Mother
65	December 19	Holiday Spectacular	
