= List of The Daily Show episodes (1997) =

- No. of episodes: 160

Release
- Original network: Comedy Central

Season chronology
- ← Previous; 1996 episodes Next → 1998 episodes

This is a list of episodes for The Daily Show in 1997. It covers shows hosted by Craig Kilborn.

== 1997 ==
=== January ===
No.	Date	Guest	Promotion
66	January 6	David Faustino	Married... with Children
67	January 7	Kathy Kinney	The Drew Carey Show
68	January 8	John Salley	
69	January 9	Jill Novick	Beverly Hills 90210
70	January 13	Richard Kind	Spin City
71	January 14	Vincent D'Onofrio	
72	January 15	Jonathan Katz	
73	January 16	Richard Kline	
74	January 20	Sydney Biddle Barrows	
75	January 21	John Cleese	Fierce Creatures
76	January 22	Tracy Nelson	
77	January 23	Steve Guttenberg	Zeus and Roxanne
78	January 27	Vondie Curtis-Hall	Chicago Hope and Gridlock'd
79	January 28	Christopher Guest	Waiting for Guffman
80	January 29	Jonathan Silverman	The Single Guy
81	January 30	Rodney Dangerfield	Meet Wally Sparks

=== February ===
No.	Date	Guest	Promotion
82	February 3	Rob Estes	Melrose Place
83	February 4	Montel Williams	
84	February 5	Timothy Dalton	The Beautician and the Beast
85	February 6	John Leguizamo	The Pest
86	February 10	Scott Glenn	Absolute Power
87	February 11	Uri Geller	
88	February 12	Nancy Glass	
89	February 13	Chevy Chase	Vegas Vacation
90	February 24	Paul Rudd	
91	February 25	Pauly Shore	
92	February 26	Tommy Davidson	Booty Call
93	February 27	Merrill Markoe	

=== March ===
No.	Date	Guest	Promotion
94	March 3	Debi Mazar	
95	March 4	Carol Alt	
96	March 5	Jackie Collins	
97	March 6	Bruno Kirby	Donnie Brasco
98	March 10	Charles Osgood	
99	March 11	Pat O'Brien	
100	March 12	Richard Lewis	
101	March 13	Blair Brown	
102	March 17	George Segal	Just Shoot Me
103	March 19	Spalding Gray	
104	March 20	Jennifer Tilly	Liar Liar
105	March 24	Famke Janssen	
106	March 25	Joe Pantoliano	
107	March 26	The Cast of Viva Variety	
108	March 27	Marlon Wayans & Kadeem Hardison	The 6th Man

=== April ===
No.	Date	Guest	Promotion
109	April 7	Michael DeLorenzo	New York Undercover
110	April 8	Milton Berle	
111	April 9	John Waters	
112	April 10	Joanna Kerns	
113	April 14	Ron Palillo	
114	April 15	David Alan Grier	McHale's Navy
115	April 16	Keith Olbermann	Sportscenter
116	April 17	Peri Gilpin	Frasier
117	April 21	Tom Wopat & John Schneider	The Dukes of Hazzard: Reunion!
118	April 22	Kevin Meaney	
119	April 23	Cathy Moriarty	
120	April 24	Joyce Brothers	
121	April 28	Janeane Garofalo	Romy & Michele's High School Reunion
122	April 29	Wilt Chamberlain	
123	April 30	Wendy Liebman	

=== May ===
No.	Date	Guest	Promotion
124	May 1	Joely Fisher	
125	May 5	Connie Britton	Spin City
126	May 6	Sheryl Lee Ralph	
127	May 7	Mike Myers	Austin Powers: International Man of Mystery
128	May 8	Patrick Dempsey	
129	May 12	Lea Thompson	Caroline in the City
130	May 13	Judd Nelson	Suddenly Susan
131	May 14	Tisha Campbell-Martin	Martin
132	May 15	Ron Leibman	
133	May 19	Rita Rudner	
134	May 20	Charo	
135	May 21	Sammy Hagar	
136	May 22	Kenny Anderson	

=== June ===
No.	Date	Guest	Promotion
137	June 2	Kim Coles	Living Single
138	June 3	Elayne Boosler	
139	June 4	Ken Ober	
140	June 5	Vince Vaughn	The Lost World: Jurassic Park
141	June 9	Andy Dick	
142	June 10	Reginald VelJohnson	
143	June 11	Charles Shaughnessy	
144	June 12	Troy Donahue	
145	June 16	Marlon Wayans & Shawn Wayans	The Wayans Bros.
146	June 17	David Arquette	
147	June 18	Bobcat Goldthwait	
148	June 19	Eric Schaeffer	
149	June 23	Robert Wuhl	
150	June 24	Darrell Hammond	
151	June 25	Peter Fonda	Ulee's Gold
152	June 26	Brent Spiner	

=== July ===
No.	Date	Guest	Promotion
153	July 7	Dyan Cannon	
154	July 8	Betty White	
155	July 9	Kathy Griffin	
156	July 10	Julia Sweeney	
157	July 14	Richard Jeni	
158	July 15	Brendan Fraser	George of the Jungle
159	July 16	Belinda Carlisle	
160	July 17	The Bert Fershners	
161	July 22	First Anniversary Special	
162	July 23	Sugar Ray Leonard	
163	July 24	Ben Stein	
164	July 28	Erica Jong	
165	July 29	Thomas Haden Church	George of the Jungle
166	July 30	Jay Mohr	
167	July 31	John Leguizamo	Spawn

=== August ===
No.	Date	Guest	Promotion
168	August 11	Cindy Crawford	
169	August 12	Lauren Lane	
170	August 13	Joy Behar	The View
171	August 14	Tony Randall	
172	August 18	Marilu Henner	
173	August 19	Isaac Hayes	
174	August 20	Loretta Lynn	
175	August 21	Rebecca Lobo	

=== September ===
No.	Date	Guest	Promotion
176	September 2	Vicki Lawrence	
177	September 3	Lorrie Morgan	
178	September 4	Christopher McDonald	
179	September 8	Khandi Alexander	
180	September 9	Mark Addy	
181	September 10	Michael Palin	Full Circle with Michael Palin
182	September 11	Andrew Dice Clay	
183	September 15	Stefanie Powers	
184	September 16	Yasmine Bleeth	
185	September 17	Richard Lewis	
186	September 18	David Cross & Bob Odenkirk	
187	September 22	Guy Pearce	L.A. Confidential
188	September 23	Debbie Reynolds	In & Out
189	September 24	Jaleel White	Family Matters
190	September 25	Maureen McCormick	Get to the Heart: The Barbara Mandrell Story
191	September 29	Joe Lando	Dr. Quinn, Medicine Woman
192	September 30	Keith Olbermann	

=== October ===
No.	Date	Guest	Promotion
193	October 1	John Tesh	
194	October 2	Sharon Lawrence	NYPD Blue
195	October 6	Alan Ruck	
196	October 7	Harland Williams	
197	October 8	Janeane Garofalo	
198	October 9	Penelope Ann Miller	
199	October 20	Joey Lawrence	
200	October 21	Richard Jeni	
201	October 22	Lucy Lawless	Xena: Warrior Princess
202	October 23	Annie Potts	
203	October 27	Matt Stone and Trey Parker	South Park
204	October 28	Suzanne Somers	Step by Step
205	October 29	Adam Arkin	Chicago Hope
206	October 30	Paul Provenza	

=== November ===
No.	Date	Guest	Promotion
207	November 3	Michael J. Fox	Spin City
208	November 4	Jason Gedrick	
209	November 5	French Stewart	3rd Rock from the Sun
210	November 10	Paul Rodriguez	
211	November 11	Lynn Whitfield	
212	November 12	Gail O'Grady	
213	November 13	Bill Murray	The Man Who Knew Too Little
214	November 17	Fred Savage	
215	November 18	Kathy Griffin	
216	November 19	Bill Murray	
217	November 20	Denis Leary	

=== December ===
No.	Date	Guest	Promotion
218	December 1	Alexandra Wentworth	
219	December 2	Ernie Hudson	
220	December 3	Richard Belzer	Homicide: Life on the Street
221	December 4	Garcelle Beauvais	
222	December 15	Benjamin Salisbury	
223	December 16	Mark Hamill	
224	December 17	Andy Williams Christmas Special	
225	December 18	Jamie Luner	Melrose Place
