= List of The Daily Show episodes (2012) =

- No. of episodes: 159

Release
- Original network: Comedy Central

Season chronology
- ← Previous; 2011 episodes Next → 2013 episodes

This is a list of episodes for The Daily Show with Jon Stewart in 2012.

== 2012 ==
=== January ===
Date	Guest	Promotion
January 3	Charles Barkley	Inside the NBA, Weight Watchers
January 4	Elizabeth Dowling Taylor	Taylor, Elizabeth Dowling (March 11, 2024). A Slave in the White House: Paul Jennings and the Madisons. Macmillan. ISBN 978-0-230-10893-6.
January 5	Craig Shirley	Shirley, Craig (March 11, 2024). December 1941: 31 Days That Changed America and Saved the World. Thomas Nelson. ISBN 978-1-59555-457-4.
January 9	George Lucas	Red Tails
January 10	Andrew Napolitano	
January 11	Jim DeMint	Demint, Senator Jim (March 11, 2024). Now or Never: Saving America from Economic Collapse. Center Street. ISBN 978-1-4555-1184-6.
January 12	Dolly Parton	Joyful Noise
January 16	Jodi Kantor	Kantor, Jodi (March 11, 2024). The Obamas. Little, Brown. ISBN 978-0-316-09875-5.
January 17	Liam Neeson	The Grey
January 18	Joe Nocera	
January 19	Elizabeth Banks	Man on a Ledge
January 23	Kathleen Sebelius	Health and Human Services Secretary
January 24	Elizabeth Warren	D- Candidate for U.S. Senate, Massachusetts
January 25	Paula Broadwell	All In: The Education of General David Petraeus. Penguin Press. March 11, 2024. ISBN 978-1-59420-318-3.
January 26	Tilda Swinton	We Need to Talk About Kevin
January 30	Lou Dobbs	Lou Dobbs Tonight
January 31	Jonathan Macey	professor, Yale Law School

=== February ===
Date	Guest	Promotion
February 1	Brad Pitt	Moneyball
February 2	David Agus	Author, The End of Illness. Free Press. March 11, 2024. ISBN 978-1-4516-1017-8.
February 13	Ali Soufan	Author, Soufan, Ali; Freedman, Daniel (September 12, 2011). The Black Banners. W.W. Norton & Company. ISBN 978-0-393-07942-5.
February 14	Ricky Gervais	Life's Too Short
February 15	Louise Slaughter	(D) New York
February 16	Arne Duncan	Secretary of Education
February 20	Alan Huffman & Michael Rejebian	Authors, Huffman, Alan; Rejebian, Michael (January 24, 2012). We're With Nobody. HarperCollins. ISBN 978-0-06-201577-8.
February 21	Russ Feingold	Author, Feingold, Russ (March 11, 2024). While America Sleeps. Crown Publishers. ISBN 978-0-307-95252-3.
February 22	Bruce Bartlett	Author, Bartlett, Bruce (January 24, 2012). The Benefit and the Burden. Simon and Schuster. ISBN 978-1-4516-4619-1.
February 23	Paul Rudd	Wanderlust
February 27	Neil deGrasse Tyson	Author, Tyson, Neil Degrasse (March 11, 2024). Space Chronicles. W. W. Norton & Company. ISBN 978-0-393-08210-4.
February 28	Stephen Merchant	Life's Too Short
February 29	Masha Gessen	Author, Gessen, Masha (March 11, 2024). The Man Without a Face: The Unlikely Rise of Vladimir Putin. Riverhead Books. ISBN 978-1-59448-842-9.

=== March ===
Date	Guest	Promotion
March 1	M. Cathleen Kaveny	professor of Law & Theology, Notre Dame
March 5	Shaun Donovan	Secretary of Housing & Urban Development
March 6	Julianne Moore	Game Change
March 7	Cecile Richards	President, Planned Parenthood Action Fund
March 8	Trita Parsi	Author, Parsi, Trita (March 11, 2024). A Single Roll of the Dice. Yale University Press. ISBN 978-0-300-16936-2.
March 12	Grover Norquist	President, Americans for Tax Reform / Author, Norquist, Grover Glenn; John r. Lott, Jr (February 28, 2012). Debacle. John Wiley & Sons. ISBN 978-1-118-18617-6.
March 13	Will Ferrell	Casa de Mi Padre
March 14	Rachel Weisz	The Deep Blue Sea
March 15	None	
March 26	Shaquille O'Neal	TNT Analyst, Inside the NBA
March 27	Maria Goodavage	Author, Goodavage, Maria (March 11, 2024). Soldier Dogs. Dutton. ISBN 978-0-525-95278-7.
March 28	Ahmed Rashid	Author, Rashid, Ahmed (March 11, 2024). Pakistan on the Brink. Viking. ISBN 978-0-670-02346-2.
March 29	Rachel Maddow	Author, Drift. March 11, 2024. ISBN 978-0-300-16936-2.

=== April ===
Date	Guest	Promotion
April 2	Mohamed Nasheed	The Island President / Former President of the Maldives
April 3	Tom Goldstein	Publisher, SCOTUSblog
April 4	Jack Goldsmith	Author, Power and Constraint
April 5	Anthony Bourdain	No Reservations
April 9	Tim Weiner	Author, Enemies: A History of the FBI
April 10	Elon Musk	CEO, SpaceX
April 11	Ricky Gervais	The Ricky Gervais Show
April 12	Esperanza Spalding	Radio Music Society
April 16	Jane Goodall	Spokesperson, Chimpanzee
April 17	Julia Louis-Dreyfus	Veep
April 18	Robert Reich	Author, Beyond Outrage
April 19	Judy Smith	Author, Good Self, Bad Self
April 23	Ben Rattray	Founder, Change.org
April 24	Madeleine Albright	Author, Prague Winter / Former U.S. Secretary of State
April 25	Jason Segel	The Five-Year Engagement
April 26	Robert Draper	Author, Do Not Ask What Good We Do
April 30	Zach Wahls	Author, My Two Moms

=== May ===
Date	Guest	Promotion
May 1	David Barton	Author, The Jefferson Lies
May 2	Sen. Tom Coburn	Author, The Debt Bomb / (R) Oklahoma
May 3	Peter Bergen	Author, Manhunt
May 7	"Admiral General Aladeen" (Sacha Baron Cohen)	The nation of Wadiya
May 8	Ambassador Ivo Daalder	U.S. Ambassador to NATO
May 9	John R. Hall	Author, Queen Elizabeth and Her Church / Dean of Westminster Abbey
May 10	Robert Caro	Author, The Passage of Power
May 29	First Lady Michelle Obama	Author, American Grown
May 30	Dan Rather	Author, Rather Outspoken
May 31	Jim Parsons	Harvey

=== June ===
Date	Guest	Promotion
June 4	Thomas Mann & Norman Ornstein	Co-authors, It's Even Worse Than It Looks
June 5	Gary Johnson	Former Governor of New Mexico
June 6	Michael Fassbender	Prometheus
June 7	Edward Conard	Author, Unintended Consequences
June 11	Boris Johnson	Mayor of London / Author, Johnson's Life of London
June 12	Colin Powell	Former Secretary of State / Author, It Worked for Me
June 13	Maggie Gyllenhaal	Actor
June 14	Catherine Zeta-Jones	Actor
June 18	Parmy Olson	Author, We are Anonymous
June 19	Denis Leary	Actor (originally planned was: Sen. Marco Rubio)
June 20	Steve Carell	Actor
June 21	Bassem Youssef	Al Bernameg
June 25	Marco Rubio	U.S. Senator
June 26	Seth MacFarlane	Ted
June 27	Andrew Garfield	Actor
June 28	Tenacious D	Band

=== July ===
Date	Guest	Promotion
July 16	Louis C.K.	comedian
July 17	Victor Cruz	American football player / Author, Out of the Blue
July 18	Sigourney Weaver	Political Animals
July 19	E.J. Dionne	Author, Our Divided Political Heart: The Battle for the American Idea in an Age of Discontent. March 11, 2024. ISBN 978-1-60819-201-4.
July 23	Fareed Zakaria	Author, The Post-American World. W.W. Norton & Co. March 11, 2024. ISBN 978-0-393-33480-7.
July 24	Matthew McConaughey	Killer Joe
July 25	Joseph Stiglitz	Author, The Price of Inequality: How Today's Divided Society Endangers Our Future. March 11, 2024. ISBN 978-0-393-08869-4.
July 26	Zach Galifianakis & Will Ferrell	The Campaign
July 30	Rashida Jones	Celeste and Jesse Forever
July 31	Dambisa Moyo	Author, Winner Take All: China's Race for Resources and What It Means for the World. Basic Books. March 11, 2024. ISBN 978-0-465-02828-3.

=== August ===
Date	Guest	Promotion
August 1	Fred Guterl	Author, The Fate of the Species: Why the Human Race may Cause Its Own Extinction and How We Can Stop It. March 11, 2024. ISBN 978-1-60819-258-8.
August 2	Jessica Biel	Total Recall
August 6	Tim Gunn	Project Runway
August 7	Saima Wahab	Author, Wahab, Saima (March 11, 2024). In My Father's Country. Crown Publishers. ISBN 978-0-307-88494-7.
August 8	Chris Rock	2 Days in New York
August 9	Joanna Brooks	Author, Brooks, Joanna (March 11, 2024). The Book of Mormon Girl: Stories from an American Faith. Queen Bee Press. ISBN 978-0-615-59344-9.
August 13	Robert Pattinson	Cosmopolis
August 14	Misty May-Treanor	London 2012 Olympic gold medallist
August 15	Brian Williams	NBC Nightly News
August 16	Rob Corddry	Childrens Hospital
August 28	Marco Rubio	U.S. Senator
August 29	Herman Cain	Former presidential candidate for the Republican Party
August 30	Michael Steele	Former Republican National Committee Chairman
August 31	none	

=== September ===
Date	Guest	Promotion
September 4	Tom Brokaw	Author
September 5	Kirsten Gillibrand	U.S. Senator
September 6	Austan Goolsbee	
September 7	none	
September 17	Kofi Annan	Former Secretary-General of the United Nations
September 18	Salman Rushdie	Author, Joseph Anton: A Memoir
September 19	Pink	Musician
September 20	Bill Clinton	Former President of the United States
September 25	Abdullah II bin Al-Hussein	King of Jordan
September 26	Olivia Wilde	Butter
September 27	Amar'e Stoudemire	Professional basketball player and author of the STAT book series for children

=== October ===
Date	Guest	Promotion
October 1	Arnold Schwarzenegger	Schwarzenegger, Arnold; Petre, Peter (October 2012). Total Recall: My Unbelievably True Life Story. Simon and Schuster. ISBN 978-1-4516-6243-6.
October 2	Liam Neeson	Taken 2
October 3	Rand Paul	Government Bullies: How Everyday Americans Are Being Harassed, Abused, and Imprisoned by the Feds ISBN 978-1455522750
October 4	Bill O'Reilly	O'Reilly, Bill; Dugard, Martin (October 2, 2012). Killing Kennedy: The End of Camelot. Macmillan. ISBN 978-0-8050-9666-8.
October 8	Pete Townshend	Townshend, Pete (October 8, 2012). Who I Am: A Memoir. HarperCollins. ISBN 978-0-06-212724-2.
October 9	Ben Affleck	Argo
October 10	Magic Johnson	Spokesperson for OraQuick
October 11	Paul Thomas Anderson	The Master
October 15	J. K. Rowling	Rowling, J. K. (March 11, 2024). The Casual Vacancy. Little, Brown. ISBN 978-1-4087-0420-2.
October 16	Eugene Jarecki	The House I Live In
October 17	Nate Silver	Silver, Nate (September 27, 2012). The Signal and the Noise: Why Most Predictions Fail – But Some Don't. Penguin. ISBN 978-1-59420-411-1.
October 18	President Barack Obama	
October 22	D. L. Hughley	The Endangered List
October 23	Gerard Butler	Chasing Mavericks
October 24	Dakota Meyer	Into the Fire: A Firsthand Account of the Most Extraordinary Battle in the Afghan War. Random House. March 11, 2024. ISBN 978-0-8129-9340-0.
October 25	Nancy Pelosi	Minority Leader of the United States House of Representatives
October 31	Jon Ronson	Ronson, Jon (March 11, 2024). Lost at Sea: The Jon Ronson Mysteries. Riverhead Books. ISBN 978-1-59463-137-5.

=== November ===
Date	Guest	Promotion
November 1	Bob Woodruff	The Bob Woodruff Foundation's Stand Up For Heroes
November 5	Martha Raddatz	American reporter with ABC News
November 6	Election Night: This Ends Now	Live coverage of the United States Presidential Election
November 7	Nate Silver	Silver, Nate (March 11, 2024). The Signal and the Noise: Why Most Predictions Fail – But Some Don't. Penguin. ISBN 978-1-59420-411-1.
November 8	Katie Dellamaggiore and Pobo Efekoro	Brooklyn Castle
November 12	Mike Huckabee	Dear Chandler, Dear Scarlett: A Grandfather's Thoughts on Faith, Family, and the Things That Matter Most. March 11, 2024. ISBN 978-1-59523-093-5.
November 13	Jason Sudeikis	Saturday Night Live
November 14	Jon Meacham	Thomas Jefferson: The Art of Power. Random House. March 11, 2024. ISBN 978-1-4000-6766-4.
November 15	Andrew Napolitano	Theodore and Woodrow: How Two American Presidents Destroyed Constitutional Freedom. ISBN 978-1-59555-351-5.
November 26	David Nasaw	The Patriarch: The Remarkable Life and Turbulent Times of Joseph P. Kennedy. Penguin Press. March 11, 2024. ISBN 978-1-59420-376-3.
November 27	Warren Buffett and Carol Loomis	Tap Dancing to Work: Warren Buffett on Practically Everything, 1966-2012. ISBN 978-1-59184-573-7.
November 28	Neil Young	Waging Heavy Peace. March 11, 2024. ISBN 978-0-399-15946-6.
November 29	Calvin Trillin	Dogfight: The 2012 Presidential Campaign in Verse. Random House of Canada, Limited. March 11, 2024. ISBN 978-0-8129-9368-4.

=== December ===
Date	Guest	Promotion
December 3	Denis Leary	Leary, Denis (October 30, 2012). Denis Leary's Merry F#%$in' Christmas. Running Press. ISBN 978-0-7624-4762-6.
December 4	R. A. Dickey	Dickey, Robert Allen; Coffey, Wayne R. (March 11, 2024). Wherever I Wind Up: My Quest for Truth, Authenticity and the Perfect Knuckleball. Blue Rider Press. ISBN 978-0-399-15815-5.
December 5	Alan Simpson	Co-Chair of the National Commission on Fiscal Responsibility and Reform
December 6	Chris Christie	Governor of New Jersey
December 10	Bishop Gene Robinson	Robinson, Gene (March 11, 2024). God Believes in Love: Straight Talk About Gay Marriage. Knopf. ISBN 978-0-307-95788-7.
December 11	Laura Linney	Hyde Park on Hudson
December 12	Cory Booker	Mayor of Newark, New Jersey
December 13	Kristen Stewart	On the Road
