= Why We're Polarized =

2020 book by Ezra Klein

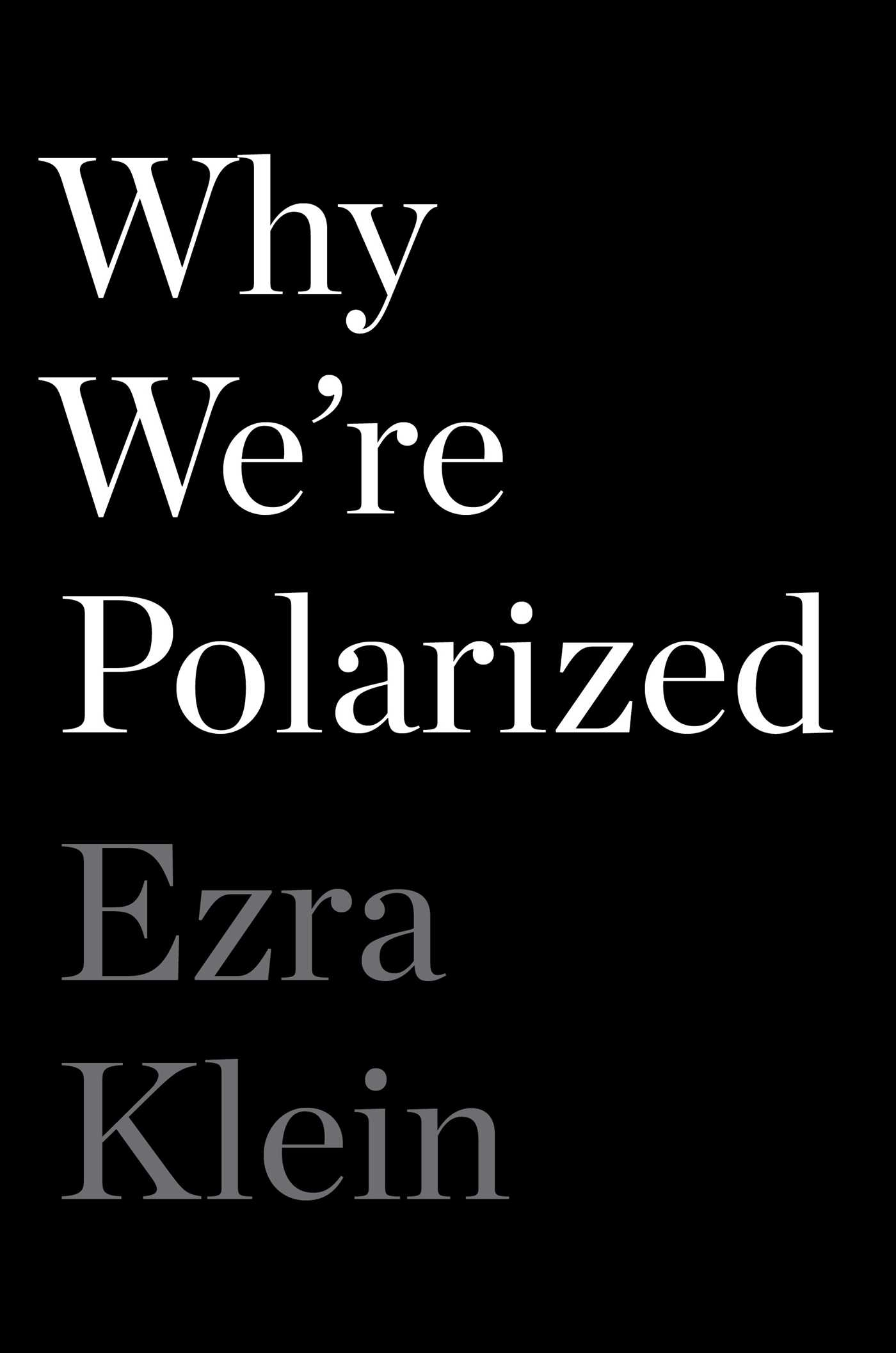
- Cover of the first edition
- Author: Ezra Klein
- Audio read by: Ezra Klein
- Cover artist: Alison Forner
- Language: English
- Subject: Politicization in the United States
- Publisher: Avid Reader Press
- Publication date: January 28, 2020
- Publication place: United States
- Media type: Print (hardcover), e-book, audiobook
- Pages: 336
- ISBN: 9781476700328 (hardcover)
- OCLC: 1142504857

Why We're Polarized is a 2020 non-fiction book by American journalist Ezra Klein, in which he analyzes political polarization in the United States. Focusing in particular on the growing polarization between the major political parties in the United States (the Democratic Party and the Republican Party), Klein argues that a combination of good intentions gone wrong, such as dealing with an arguably more unjust political consensus maintained at the expense of minorities, and inherent glitches in the institutional design of the country's federal government have caused widespread social problems.

Opinions on the book are polarized, with positive reviews in The New York Times and Foreign Affairs, mostly positive but somewhat critical reviews in The Washington Post, Publishers Weekly, and Kirkus Reviews, mixed reviews in The New Yorker, The New Republic, Dissent, and Jacobin, and mostly negative reviews in The Wall Street Journal, Commentary, and The Outline.

== Background and contents ==
The author delves into the history of the United States and finds that the country's politics after the end of the civil war constituted an artificial peace in which popular passions didn't adequately get represented by the actions of mainstream political parties. Furthermore, this peace was at the expense of the nation's various minorities whose unjust treatment was to be ignored, especially African Americans – as Congressional supporters of Jim Crow laws demanded these laws be unchallenged in exchange for cooperation, not even by powerful politicians like President Franklin D. Roosevelt. He reminds readers that commentators in both the 1950s and the 1960s criticized the set-up of pitting the Democratic Party against the Republican Party, with the two organizations getting labeled as being too similar. The prominent status of ideological conservatives and liberals in both parties, Klein writes, created a complicated situation for voters. The author particularly cites American racial debates as having warped political organization, writing that prejudicial policies "kept the Democratic party less liberal than it otherwise would’ve been, the Republican Party Congressionally weaker than it otherwise would’ve been, and stopped the parties from sorting themselves around the deepest political cleavage of the age."

The passage of the Civil Rights Act of 1964 resulted in widespread re-sorting along different lines both inside of and in between the two major parties. Furthermore, the decline of mass media and the rise of niche-based consumption of various socio-political material has exacerbated this trend, according to Klein. Eventually, Klein argues, the polarization has resulted in a country where large numbers of people fear a kind of coming apocalypse at the hands of those with whom they disagree.

"The parties are dividing over fundamental identities that tend to generate intolerance and hostility," Klein writes. Human beings form groups and set up collective identities as part of their inherent nature due to their psychological identities, he states, yet the dynamics in American politics have caused multiple methods of categorization from ethnicity to gender to religion and more to merge into "mega-identities". Thus, in Klein's eyes, the two parties represent fundamentally different types of people to which, due to this identity fusion, frustrating conflict becomes inevitable. "What if our loyalties and prejudices are governed by instinct and merely rationalized as calculation?" he asks.

Klein particularly criticizes his own profession, describing the process behind how exactly journalists decide what stories to cover. He argues that modern journalism has fed into a deleterious feedback loop, with attempts to actually persuade individuals generating far less interest than material meant to feed partisanship. In profession-based terms, he also remarks upon what he sees as an inherent instability of a republic headed by modern-style president.

== Reception ==
The book has received polarized reviews, with praise and criticism coming from both the political left and right.

It received positive reviews in Foreign Affairs and The New York Times. In Foreign Affairs, Amy Chua, a professor of law at Yale Law School, called Klein one of "the country's keenest political observers" and recognized the book as "a cut above the slew of other [books] on the United States' divisions". She notes that Klein marshals an "impressive body of evidence" to bolster his view that partisan identity has become central to "psychological self-expression", and praises how he "takes into account a multitude of factors" underlying political polarization, including "institutional, cultural, and psychological" factors, faulting him only for his "surprisingly dismissive" consideration of class. In The New York Times, political scientist Norman J. Ornstein was similarly positive. Ornstein states that Klein provides a "thoughtful, clear and persuasive analysis", and praises Klein for identifying "a logic to our polarization".

Two slightly more critical but still positive reviews appeared in The Washington Post. In the first, Francis Fukuyama calls the book "superbly researched and written" and praises Klein for "digesting mountains of social science research and presenting it in an engaging form". However, he also identifies "two areas of weakness": Klein's overemphasis on race, and Klein's impractical slate of proposed solutions. In the second review, political scientist Dan Hopkins starts by saying that the book "fully displays the attributes that have made Klein’s journalism so successful", and argues that "Klein’s general characterization of polarization as a feedback loop is surely right". However, he contends that Klein's views on intense polarization, while applying well to elites, may overstate polarization among the broader American public. He states: "There is definitely a 'we' that is highly polarized on issues and divided on a series of fundamental, identity-infused questions. But that 'we' may be smaller than Klein’s book sometimes suggests".

Other positive reviews harboring criticisms include those by Publishers Weekly and Kirkus Reviews, both of which praised Klein's analysis of political polarization but found his proposed solutions to be wanting. Publishers Weekly praised the author's "pithy assessments" and "thoughtful, evenhanded outlook" on polarization; however, they stated that readers may be disappointed by the "modest" solutions he sets forth in the book. In Kirkus Reviews, Klein's "deeply insightful, if dispiriting, analysis" received praise for providing a "sharp explanation of how American politics has become so discordant", but they lamented as well Klein's lack of significant solutions to the politicization and polarization issues.

The book received mixed reviews in The New Yorker, left-wing magazines The New Republic and Dissent, and socialist magazine Jacobin. In The New Yorker, journalist Stephen Metcalf is supportive yet critical, labeling the author "a maestro at compactly and elegantly summarizing the work of others" but criticizing Klein's advocacy for certain solutions to U.S. political polarization as well as finding fault with Klein's particular writing style and intellectual approach. To Metcalf, "Klein, ultimately, cannot square his desire to nudge the polity back toward capital-L Liberalism—the creation of a polis built on the dialogue of free citizens with one another—with his inclination to offer capital-E Explanations for our political behavior." In The New Republic, progressive political commentator Osita Nwanevu says that while the book "weaves together recent political history and reams of research to explain how we arrived here and how we might make our way forward", it "does not fully succeed" and is ultimately a "flawed diagnosis" that does not fully appreciate the complexities of the sources producing polarization and does not fully grapple with the difficulty of addressing polarization. In Dissent, political scientist Daniel Schlozman says that the book is a "persuasive account of polarization's rise", but semi-derisively labels the book a "well-read amateur’s tour of what scholars have to say about group psychology and political behavior" and states that it "ultimately fails to account for our deepest divides", in particular criticizing its lack of attention to power dynamics, resulting in Klein letting "the ruling classes off easy". In Jacobin, Sohale Andrus Mortazavi lauds Klein's analysis of the systemic effects of polarization on American democratic structures, calling it "convincing" and "grounded in material reality". But he spends considerable time deriding the paucity of class analysis and castigating Klein's proposed solutions, saying the "individualist solutions" advanced by Klein are "no answer to intractable societal problems".

A negative review comes from Aaron Timms in The Outline. He describes the book as "a little like reading a policy explainer on Vox: everything seems at once comprehensive and reasonable and consequential, but on closer inspection there are major omissions and unresolved contradictions", and points to "a good deal of ahistorical nonsense to bring his argument to the desired consistency". He takes particular issue with Klein's claim that "demography and culture, not economic and political developments, hold the key to understanding the populist moment", chastising Klein for what he views as Klein's lack of "any real attempt to reckon with the role played by economics" and musing that the "economic dimension of the rage coursing through the US electorate might have forced Klein to venture into territory he’s uncomfortable with...push[ing] him to confront the very order (financialized, market-friendly liberalism) that provides the bedrock to much of his own writing".

Mostly negative reviews by conservatives appeared in The Wall Street Journal and Commentary. In The Wall Street Journal, conservative political commentator Barton Swaim lambasts Klein for a "deficit in modesty", which he argues leads Klein to lack "self-criticism", to provide a more favorable analysis of progressives, and to propose a slate of "left-liberal" solutions. He faults Klein in particular for what he sees as an overly simplistic division "between 'hope,' on the one hand, and a revanchist yearning to keep out Muslims and Mexicans, on the other", asking whether radicalization within the Republican Party is not all the result of "whites’ fear of America becoming a majority-minority nation", but also a reaction "to the Democratic Party's own radicalization—its wanton use of race as a weapon, its quick acceptance of every new fad in sexual identity, its embrace of the self-hating ideologies prevailing on elite college campuses". In Commentary, conservative political commentator Kevin D. Williamson also criticizes Klein for his perceived left-bias, writing that Klein "deforms what might have been a very interesting and valuable book by shoehorning a preexisting, self-serving progressive master-narrative into his larger account". Williamson also questions Klein's conclusions, contending that Klein "mistakes the emergence of political parties that are more homogeneous—more polarized, as Klein would have it—with a polity that is more polarized".

== See also ==
- Identity (social science)
  - Identity fusion
  - Identity politics
- It's Even Worse Than It Looks
- Politicization
- Politics of the United States
