= Ezra Klein =

American journalist (born 1984)

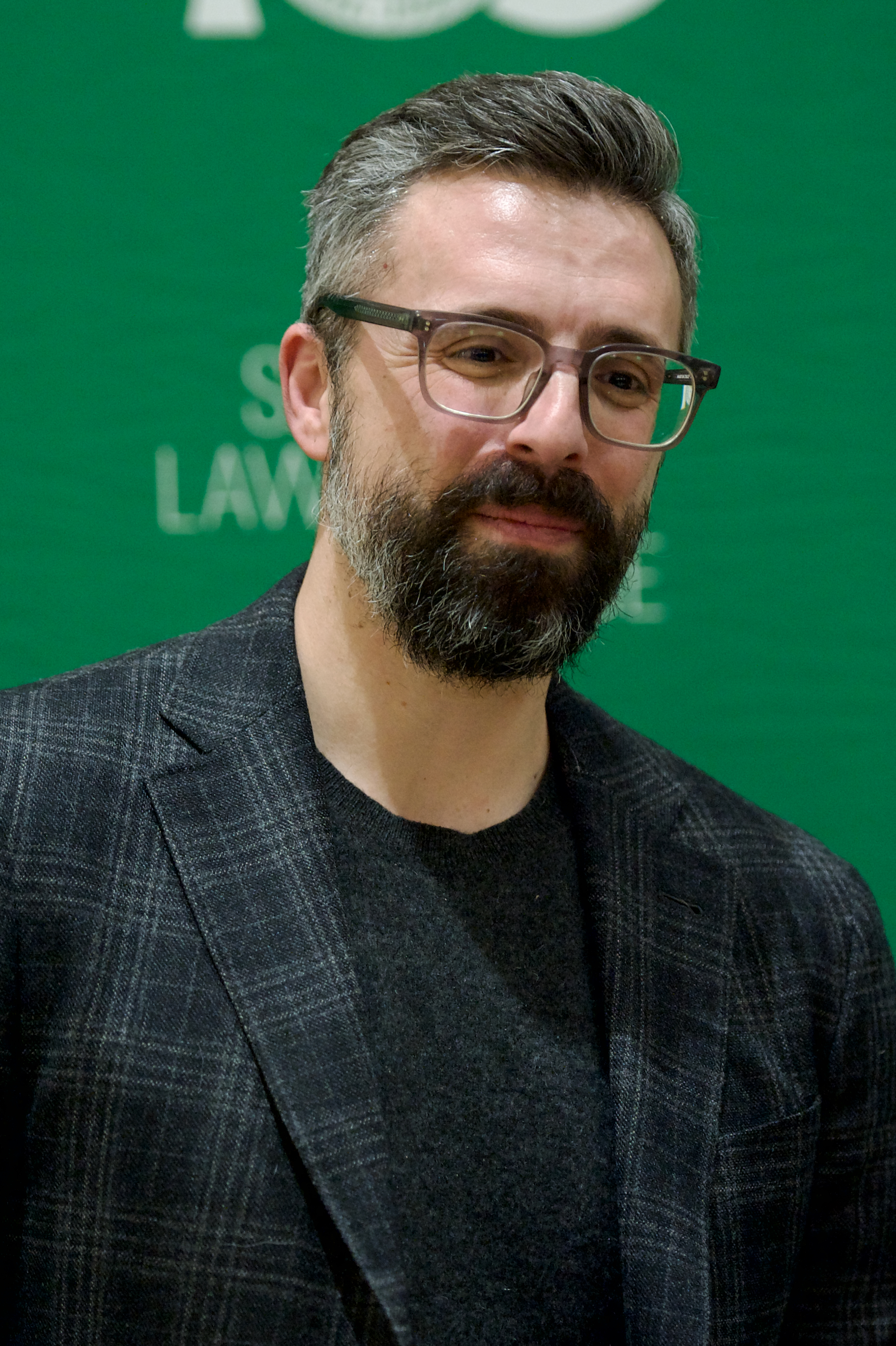
- Klein in 2026
- Born: May 9, 1984 (age 42); Irvine, California, U.S.
- Education: University of California, Santa Cruz; University of California, Los Angeles (BA)
- Occupations: Journalist; political commentator; podcast host
- Years active: 2003–present
- Employers: The New York Times; The Washington Post; MSNBC; Bloomberg; Vox Media
- Spouse: Annie Lowrey (m. 2011)
- Children: 2
- Relatives: Abel Klein (father)
- Klein's voice Klein discussing the management of the federal government of the United States. Recorded March 7, 2025
- Website: The Ezra Klein Show

Ezra Klein (born May 9, 1984) is an American liberal political commentator and journalist. He has been a New York Times columnist since 2021 and is the host of The Ezra Klein Show podcast. He is a co-founder of Vox and was formerly the website's editor-at-large. He has held editorial positions at The Washington Post and The American Prospect and was a regular contributor to Bloomberg News and MSNBC. Klein has written two books, both published by Simon & Schuster: Why We're Polarized in January 2020, and Abundance, cowritten with Derek Thompson, in March 2025.

Klein rose to prominence as a blogger who became well known for his in-depth analysis on a range of policy issues. By 2007, Klein's blog had gained a substantial following and was acquired by The American Prospect, where he was an associate editor. At The Washington Post, Klein managed Wonkblog, a branded blog that featured his writing on domestic policy.

In 2014, alongside fellow journalists Matthew Yglesias and Melissa Bell, Klein co-founded Vox, a website for explanatory news owned by Vox Media. He was the editor-in-chief, and later the editor-at-large. Klein also contributed articles to the site, hosted an associated podcast (The Ezra Klein Show), and worked as an executive producer for Vox's Netflix series Explained. In November 2020, Klein left Vox to join The New York Times as a columnist and podcast host.

== Early life and education ==
Ezra Klein was raised in Irvine, California. His father, Abel Klein, is a professor of mathematics at the University of California, Irvine; his mother is an artist. He is Jewish. Klein attended University High School, where he graduated in 2002 with a 2.2 GPA. Klein attended the University of California, Santa Cruz, for two years before transferring to the University of California, Los Angeles, from which he graduated in 2005 with a BA in political science. While at UCSC, he applied to write for City on a Hill Press but was rejected. He said school was never a great fit for him academically or socially.

== Career ==
=== Early career as political blogger ===
Klein worked on Howard Dean's 2004 presidential primary campaign in Vermont in 2003, and interned for the Washington Monthly in Washington, D.C., in 2004. "The media is as effective and important an agent for change as the legislative bodies, and I think it's where I'm happiest and most effective", Klein said. In 2003, he and Markos Moulitsas were two of the earliest bloggers to report from a political convention, that of the California State Democratic Party. In 2006, Klein was one of several writers pseudonymously flamed by The New Republic writer Lee Siegel (posting as a sock puppet called sprezzatura).

On December 10, 2007, Klein moved his blog full-time to The American Prospect.

=== Columnist at newspapers ===
Klein's prolific blogging caught the attention of Steven Pearlstein, The Washington Post's veteran business columnist. "I was blown away by how good he was—how much the kid wrote—on so many subjects", Pearlstein said. Pearlstein sent samples of Klein's work to managing editor Raju Narisetti. A few weeks after he heard from Pearlstein, Washington Post foreign correspondent John Pomfret asked Klein to have lunch with him and financial editor Sandy Sugawara. Narisetti hired Klein to be the Post's first pure blogger on politics and economics. On May 18, 2009, he began writing at the newspaper.

In May 2011, when Bloomberg View launched, Klein became a columnist there in addition to his work at The Washington Post and MSNBC.

Klein announced he would be leaving The Washington Post in January 2014, with the intent to start a new media venture with several other veteran journalists. The new media venture was later identified as the politics site Vox. Klein had previously "proposed the creation of an independent, explanatory journalism website—with more than three dozen staffers" and an annual budget of more than US$10 million to remain at The Washington Post. During negotiations, Post publisher Katharine Weymouth and new owner Jeff Bezos did not make a counteroffer.

=== Political commentator and podcaster ===
Klein was editor-in-chief at Vox, later editor-at-large, and formerly wrote for and edited Wonkblog at The Washington Post. He frequently provides political commentary on MSNBC's The Rachel Maddow Show, Hardball with Chris Matthews, and The Last Word with Lawrence O'Donnell. He is a former contributor to Countdown with Keith Olbermann. On March 14, 2013, The Week magazine reported that Klein was among those being considered to host MSNBC's yet-unnamed 8 p.m. weekday prime-time show that would replace The Ed Show. Ultimately, the time slot was filled with All In with Chris Hayes.

In October 2015, Klein, along with Sarah Kliff and Matt Yglesias, launched The Weeds, a Vox podcast of detailed discussions on public policy. Klein also hosts the podcast The Ezra Klein Show. Klein is an executive producer of Vox's Netflix series Explained, which debuted in 2018.

In October 2019, Klein, along with other reporters from Vox Media, started the podcast Impeachment, Explained. Klein joined The New York Times in 2020 and became one of its opinion columnists in 2021. According to an analysis by British digital strategist Rob Blackie, Klein was one of the most commonly followed political writers among Biden administration staff on Twitter.

=== Health care debate ===
In December 2009, Klein wrote an article for The Washington Post stating that U.S. Senator Joe Lieberman was "willing to cause the deaths of hundreds of thousands of people in order to settle an old electoral score" because Lieberman "was motivated to oppose health care legislation in part out of resentment at liberals for being defeated in the 2006 Connecticut Democratic primary." Klein based his estimate on an Urban Institute report that estimated that 22,000 people died in 2006 because they lacked health insurance. This article was criticized by Jonah Goldberg of the National Review, who called it a "silly claim". Charles Lane, also of The Washington Post, described Klein's article as an "outrageous smear". But E. J. Dionne, also of The Washington Post, agreed with Klein's claim, saying that "Klein is right that there is not a shred of principle in Lieberman's opposition." Klein later said he regretted the phrasing and his position is that despite universal coverage, the social determinants of health are still powerful predictors that, on average, ensure the lower socioeconomic classes die sooner than those with more income and education.

=== JournoList ===
In February 2007, Klein created a Google Groups forum called "JournoList" for discussing politics and the news media. The forum's membership was controlled by Klein and limited to "several hundred left-leaning bloggers, political reporters, magazine writers, policy wonks and academics." Posts within JournoList were intended only to be made and read by its members. Klein defended the forum saying that it "[ensures] that folks feel safe giving off-the-cuff analysis and instant reactions." JournoList member and Time magazine columnist Joe Klein (no relation to Ezra Klein) added that the off-the-record nature of the forum was necessary because "candor is essential and can only be guaranteed by keeping these conversations private."

The existence of JournoList was first publicly revealed in a July 27, 2007, blog post by blogger Mickey Kaus. However, the forum did not attract serious attention until March 17, 2009, when an article published on Politico detailed the nature of the forum and the extent of its membership. The Politico article set off debate within the blogosphere over the ethics of participating in JournoList and raised questions about its purpose. The first public excerpt of a discussion within JournoList was posted by Mickey Kaus on his blog on March 26, 2009.

On June 25, 2010, Ezra Klein announced in his Washington Post blog that he would be terminating the JournoList group. This decision was instigated by fellow blogger Dave Weigel's resignation from the Post following the public exposure of several of his JournoList emails about conservative media figures.

Klein had justified excluding conservative Republicans from participation as "not about fostering ideology but preventing a collapse into flame war. The emphasis is on empiricism, not ideology."

=== Charlie Kirk debate ===
In September 2025, after the assassination of a right-wing commentator Charlie Kirk, Ezra Klein wrote an article titled, "Charlie Kirk Was Practicing Politics the Right Way" for the New York Times, in which he argued that Kirk's way of setting up debates in campuses is the right way of practicing politics and that "liberalism could use more of his moxie and fearlessness".

The commentary prompted widespread reactions. Ta-Nehisi Coates criticized Klein for ignoring the racist and violent comments of Kirk. Scholars questioned Klein's definition of the "right way of politics". Professor Jed Forman from Simpson College wrote that Klein confused free speech with speech that is good for society. Professor Carrie N. Baker from Smith College wrote that Kirk's attempt to intimidate college professors from speaking out publicly about societal issues is "not practicing politics the right way". Olúfẹ́mi Táíwò, assistant professor of philosophy at Georgetown University, argued Klein was "deflecting objections to the specific accuracy of this portrayal of Kirk with claims about the general appropriateness of political violence."

=== Abundance ===
Klein co-authored the book Abundance with Derek Thompson, which was published on March 18, 2025. In an interview with The Atlantic, Klein expressed his belief that "modern liberalism is overly process focused, that it has repeatedly substituted process for outcome" and argues in favor of policies which ease regulations and restrictions on construction. He cited his 2021 essay in support of supply-side progressivism, "The Economic Mistake the Left Is Finally Confronting", as reflective of his approach in scrutinizing existing policies that he sees as running contrary to the goals of countering scarcity.

== Awards ==
In 2010, he was named Blogger of the Year by The Week magazine and The Sidney Hillman Foundation. In 2011, he was named one of the 50 most powerful people in Washington, D.C., by GQ. His blog was also named one of the 25 best financial blogs by Time magazine in 2011. In 2013, Klein won the Online News Association Award for Best Online Commentary. He also won the American Political Science Association's Carey McWilliams Award, for "a major journalistic contribution to our understanding of politics." He appeared as one of 80 men featured in Esquire's 80th anniversary issue and in a feature in T magazine.

== Personal life ==
Klein is married to Annie Lowrey, an economic policy reporter at The Atlantic. They have two children, born in 2019 and 2021. Klein is vegan and irreligious.

== Bibliography ==
- Why We're Polarized. Avid Reader Press. 2020. ISBN 978-1-4767-0032-8.
- Abundance. Avid Reader Press. 2025. ISBN 978-1-6680-2348-8.
