= List of The Daily Show episodes (2011) =

- No. of episodes: 160

Release
- Original network: Comedy Central

Season chronology
- ← Previous; 2010 episodes Next → 2012 episodes

This is a list of episodes for The Daily Show with Jon Stewart in 2011.

== 2011 ==
=== January ===
Date	Guest	Promotion
January 3	Paul Giamatti	Barney's Version
January 4	Kirsten Gillibrand	U.S. Senator (D-N.Y.)
January 5	Jimmy Wales	Wikipedia
January 6	Patton Oswalt	Oswalt, Patton (2011). Zombie Spaceship Wasteland. Scribner. ISBN 978-1-4391-4908-9.
January 10	Denis Leary	Leary, Denis (March 11, 2024). Suck On This Year: LYFAO @ 140 Characters or Less. Viking. ISBN 978-0-670-02289-2.
January 11	Colin Firth	The King's Speech
January 12	Tim Pawlenty	Former Governor of Minnesota
January 13	Ron Howard	Director, The Dilemma
January 17	Peter Bergen	Bergen, Peter L. (January 11, 2011). The Longest War: The Enduring Conflict between America and Al-Qaeda. Free Press. ISBN 978-0-7432-7893-5.
January 18	Neil deGrasse Tyson	NOVA scienceNOW
January 19	Paul Clemens	Clemens, Paul (January 2011). Punching Out: One Year in a Closing Auto Plant. Doubleday. ISBN 978-0-385-52115-4.
January 20	Kambiz Hosseini and Saman Arbabi	Parazit
January 24	Anand Giridharadas	Giridharadas, Anand (January 4, 2011). India Calling: An Intimate Portrait of a Nation's Remaking. Henry Holt and Company. ISBN 978-0-8050-9177-9.
January 25	James Franco	127 Hours
January 26	Jonathan Alter	Alter, Jonathan (January 11, 2011). The Promise: President Obama, Year One. Simon & Schuster. ISBN 978-1-4391-0120-9.
January 27	T. Boone Pickens	Chairman of BP Capital Management
January 31	Bill Gates	Bill & Melinda Gates Foundation

=== February ===
Date	Guest	Promotion
February 1	Michael Steele	Former Chairman of the Republican National Committee
February 2	Matthew Perry	Mr. Sunshine
February 3	Admiral Michael Mullen	Chairman of the Joint Chiefs of Staff
February 14	Edward Glaeser	Glaeser, Edward (2011), Triumph of the City: How Our Best Invention Makes Us Richer, Smarter, Greener, Healthier, and Happier, New York: Penguin Press, ISBN 978-1-59420-277-3
February 15	January Jones	Unknown
February 16	Brian Williams	NBC Nightly News
February 17	Ed Gillespie	Republican State Leadership Committee
February 21	Lisa Ling	Our America with Lisa Ling
February 22	Anderson Cooper	Anderson Cooper 360°
February 23	Donald Rumsfeld	Known and Unknown: A Memoir. Sentinel HC. February 8, 2011. ISBN 978-1-59523-067-6.
February 24	Austan Goolsbee	Chairman of the Council of Economic Advisers
February 28	Howard Stern	The Howard Stern Show

=== March ===
Date	Guest	Promotion
March 1	Prince Zeid Ra'ad	Our Last Best Chance: The Pursuit of Peace in a Time of Peril. Viking. 2011. ISBN 978-0-670-02171-0. (Authored by King Abdullah II)
March 2	Allison Stanger	Stanger, Allison (March 11, 2024). One Nation Under Contract: The Outsourcing of American Power and the Future of Foreign Policy. Yale University Press. ISBN 978-0-300-16832-7.
March 3	Diane Ravitch	The Death and Life of the Great American School System: How Testing and Choice Are Undermining Education. Basic Books. 2010. ISBN 978-0-465-01491-0.
March 7	Rand Paul	Paul, Rand (2011). The Tea Party Goes to Washington. Center Street. ISBN 978-1-4555-0311-7.
March 8	Brian Christian	Christian, Brian (March 11, 2024). The Most Human Human: What Talking with Computers Teaches Us About What It Means to Be Alive. Doubleday. ISBN 978-0-385-53306-5.
March 9	Aaron Eckhart	Battle: Los Angeles
March 10	Trey Parker & Matt Stone	The Book of Mormon
March 21	Sarah Vowell	Vowell, Sarah (March 11, 2024). Unfamiliar Fishes. Riverhead Books. ISBN 978-1-59448-787-3.
March 22	T.J. English	English, T. J. (2011). The Savage City: Race, Murder, and a Generation on the Edge. Harper Collins. ISBN 978-0-06-182455-5.
March 23	Richard Lewis	Misery Loves Company Tour/Curb Your Enthusiasm
March 24	Bret Baier	Special Report with Bret Baier
March 28	Dr. Mansour El-Kikhia	El-Kikhia, Mansour O. (March 11, 1997). Libya's Qaddafi: The Politics of Contradiction. University Press of Florida. ISBN 978-0-8130-1585-9.
March 29	Dr. Miguel Angelo Laporta Nicolelis	Beyond Boundaries: The New Neuroscience of Connecting Brains With Machines---and How It Will Change Our Lives. Times Books/Henry Holt and Co. 2011. ISBN 978-0-8050-9052-9.
March 30	Jake Gyllenhaal	Source Code
March 31	Norm Macdonald	The Sports Show with Norm Macdonald

=== April ===
Date	Guest	Promotion
April 4	Billy Crystal	Funny or Die: When Harry Met Sally 2 with Billy Crystal & Helen Mirren
April 5	Colin Quinn	Colin Quinn: Long Story Short
April 6	Mike Huckabee	Huckabee, Mike (2011). A Simple Government: Twelve Things We Really Need from Washington (and a Trillion That We Don't!). Sentinel. ISBN 978-1-59523-073-7.
April 7	Jamie Oliver	Jamie's Food Revolution
April 11	Foo Fighters	Wasting Light
April 12	Deval Patrick	A Reason to Believe: Lessons from an Improbable Life. Broadway Books. 2011. ISBN 978-0-7679-3112-0.
April 13	Tracy Morgan	Rio
April 14	Ricky Gervais	HBO Presents Talking Funny
April 25	Gigi Ibrahim	Tweets from Tahrir: Egypt's Revolution as it Unfolded, in the Words of the People who Made It. ISBN 978-1-935928-45-4.
April 26	Elizabeth Warren	Consumer Financial Protection Bureau
April 27	Bernie Sanders	The Speech: A Historic Filibuster on Corporate Greed and the Decline of Our Middle Class. ISBN 978-1-56858-684-7.
April 28	William Cohan	Money and Power: How Goldman Sachs Came to Rule the World. ISBN 978-0-385-52384-4.

=== May ===
Date	Guest	Promotion
May 2	Philip K. Howard	The Death of Common Sense: How Law is Suffocating America. ISBN 978-0-8129-8274-9.
May 3	Rachel Maddow	The Rachel Maddow Show
May 4	David Barton	WallBuilders
May 5	Jon Meacham	American Homer: Reflections on Shelby Foote and His Classic The Civil War: A Narrative. ISBN 978-0-679-64370-8. and Beyond Bin Laden: America and the Future of Terror
May 9	Keira Knightley	Last Night
May 10	Will Ferrell	Everything Must Go
May 11	Albert Brooks	Brooks, Albert (2011). 2030: The Real Story of What Happens to America. St. Martin's Press. ISBN 978-0-312-58372-9.
May 12	Kristen Wiig	Bridesmaids
May 16	Jon Ronson	Ronson, Jon (2011). The Psychopath Test: A Journey Through the Madness Industry. Riverhead Books. ISBN 978-1-59448-801-6.
May 17	Annie Jacobsen	Jacobsen, Annie (May 17, 2011). Area 51: An Uncensored History of America's Top Secret Military Base. Little, Brown. ISBN 978-0-316-13294-7.
May 18	Richard Beeman	Beeman, Richard (February 9, 2010). Plain, Honest Men: The Making of the American Constitution. Random House Publishing. ISBN 978-0-8129-7684-7. and Beeman, Richard (August 31, 2010). The Penguin Guide to the United States Constitution: A Fully Annotated Declaration of Independence, U.S. Constitution and Amendments, and Selections from The Federalist Papers. National Geographic Books. ISBN 978-0-14-311810-7.
May 19	Lisa P. Jackson	Administrator of the Environmental Protection Agency
May 31	Jimmy Fallon	Thank You Notes. Grand Central Pub. 2011. ISBN 978-0-89296-741-4.

=== June ===
Date	Guest	Promotion
June 1	Bill Moyers	Bill Moyers Journal: The Conversation Continues. The New Press. 2011. ISBN 978-1-59558-624-7.
June 2	Tim Tebow	Through My Eyes. HarperCollins. 2011. ISBN 978-0-06-200728-5.
June 6	Maziar Bahari	Bahari, Maziar; Molloy, Aimee (March 11, 2024). Then They Came for Me: A Family's Story of Love, Captivity, and Survival. Random House. ISBN 978-1-4000-6946-0.
June 7	Fareed Zakaria	The Post-American World: Release 2.0. W. W. Norton. 2011. ISBN 978-0-393-08180-0.
June 8	Larry King	King, Larry (2011). Truth Be Told: Off the Record about Favorite Guests, Memorable Moments, Funniest Jokes, and a Half Century of Asking Questions. Hachette Books. ISBN 978-1-60286-130-5.
June 9	Howard Wasdin	SEAL Team Six: Memoirs of an Elite Navy SEAL Sniper. ISBN 978-0-312-69945-1.
June 13	Alex Prud'homme	The Ripple Effect: The Fate of Fresh Water in the Twenty-First Century. Scribner. 2011. ISBN 978-1-4165-3545-4.
June 14	J. J. Abrams	Super 8
June 15	Trey Parker & Matt Stone	The Book of Mormon
June 20	Ray Nagin	Nagin, Ray (2011). Katrina's Secrets: Storms after the Storm. The Author. ISBN 978-1-4609-5971-8.
June 21	Cameron Diaz	Bad Teacher
June 22	Mitchell Zuckoff	Lost in Shangri-La: A True Story of Survival, Adventure, and the Most Incredible Rescue Mission of World War II. ISBN 978-0-06-198834-9.
June 23	Bruce Headlam	Page One: Inside the New York Times
June 27	Jennifer Aniston	Horrible Bosses
June 28	Louis C.K.	Louie
June 29	Tom Hanks	Larry Crowne
June 30	Bill Kristol	The Weekly Standard

=== July ===
Date	Guest	Promotion
July 11	Denis Leary	Rescue Me
July 12	Kid Rock	Born Free
July 13	Matthew Richardson	Acharya, Viral V.; Richardson, Matthew; Nieuwerburgh, Stijn van; White, Lawrence J. (April 3, 2011). Guaranteed to Fail: Fannie Mae, Freddie Mac, and the Debacle of Mortgage Finance. Princeton University Press. ISBN 978-0-691-15078-9.
July 14	Leroy Petry	Medal of Honor recipient
July 18	Daniel Radcliffe	Harry Potter and the Deathly Hallows – Part 2
July 19	Pervez Musharraf	Former President of Pakistan
July 20	Steve Carell	Crazy, Stupid, Love.
July 21	Scott Miller	The President and the Assassin: McKinley, Terror, and Empire at the Dawn of the American Century. Random House. 2011. ISBN 978-1-4000-6752-7.
July 25	Neil Patrick Harris	The Smurfs
July 26	Juan Williams	Muzzled: The Assault on Honest Debate. March 11, 2024. ISBN 978-0-307-95201-1.
July 27	Rachel Weisz	The Whistleblower
July 28	Peter Tomsen	Tomsen, Peter (July 12, 2011). The Wars of Afghanistan: Messianic Terrorism, Tribal Conflicts, and the Failures of Great Powers. PublicAffairs. ISBN 978-1-58648-763-8.

=== August ===
Date	Guest	Promotion
August 1	Freida Pinto	Rise of the Planet of the Apes
August 2	Jason Bateman	The Change-Up
August 3	Austan Goolsbee	Chief Economist for the President's Economic Recovery Advisory Board
August 4	Dick Durbin	United States Senator, D-Illinois
August 8	Mark Adams	Turn Right at Machu Picchu: Rediscovering the Lost City One Step at a Time. Dutton. March 11, 2024. ISBN 978-0-525-95224-4.
August 9	Jay Bahadur	Bahadur, Jay (March 11, 2024). The Pirates of Somalia: Inside Their Hidden World. Pantheon Books. ISBN 978-0-307-37906-1.
August 10	John Coffee	Director of the Center on Corporate Governance at Columbia University Law School
August 11	Michael Wallis	Wallis, Michael (May 16, 2011). David Crockett: The Lion of the West. W. W. Norton & Company. ISBN 978-0-393-06758-3.
August 15	Ali Velshi	How to Speak Money: The Language and Knowledge You Need Now. John Wiley & Sons. March 11, 2024. ISBN 978-1-118-11495-7.
August 16	Matt Long	The Long Run: A New York City Firefighter's Triumphant Comeback from Crash Victim to Elite Athlete. Rodale. March 11, 2024. ISBN 978-1-60529-246-5.
August 17	Michael Steele	Former Chairman of the Republican National Committee
August 18	Anne Hathaway	One Day

=== September ===
Date	Guest	Promotion
September 6	Buddy Roemer	Former Governor of Louisiana, 2012 presidential candidate
September 7	Dr. Sanjay Gupta	Dr. Sanjay Gupta Reports: Terror in the Dust
September 8	Marion Cotillard	Contagion
September 12	Admiral Michael Mullen	Chairman of the Joint Chiefs of Staff
September 13	Jim Lehrer	Tension City: Inside the Presidential Debates, from Kennedy-Nixon to Obama-McCain. Random House. March 11, 2024. ISBN 978-1-4000-6917-0.
September 14	Common	Common; Bradley, Adam (September 13, 2011). One Day It'll All Make Sense. Simon and Schuster. ISBN 978-1-4516-2587-5.
September 15	Caroline Kennedy	Kennedy, Caroline; Beschloss, Michael (March 11, 2024). Jacqueline Kennedy: Historic Conversations on Life with John F. Kennedy. Hyperion Books. ISBN 978-1-4013-2425-4.
September 20	Ron Suskind	Confidence Men: Wall Street, Washington, and the Education of a President. Harper. March 11, 2024. ISBN 978-0-06-142925-5.
September 21	Mitch Daniels	Keeping the Republic: Saving America by Trusting Americans. Sentinel. March 11, 2024. ISBN 978-1-59523-080-5.
September 22	Jennifer Granholm	Granholm, Jennifer; Mulhern, Dan (March 11, 2024). A Governor's Story: The Fight for Jobs and America's Economic Future. PublicAffairs. ISBN 978-1-58648-997-7.
September 26	Ron Paul	Member of the United States House of Representatives, 2012 presidential candidate
September 27	Seth Rogen	50/50
September 28	Bill O'Reilly	Killing Lincoln: The Shocking Assassination that Changed America Forever. Henry Holt and Co. March 11, 2024. ISBN 978-0-8050-9307-0.
September 29	Tony Bennett	Duets II

=== October ===
Date	Guest	Promotion
October 3	Thomas Friedman	That Used to Be Us: How America Fell Behind in the World It Invented and How We Can Come Back. Farrar, Straus and Giroux. March 11, 2024. ISBN 978-0-374-28890-7.
October 4	Michael Lewis	Boomerang: Travels in the New Third World. W.W. Norton. March 11, 2024. ISBN 978-0-393-08181-7.
October 5	Hugh Jackman	Real Steel
October 6	Jason Sudeikis	Saturday Night Live
October 17	Ellen Schultz	Schultz, Ellen (March 11, 2024). Retirement Heist: How Companies Plunder and Profit from the Nest Eggs of American Workers. Portfolio/Penguin. ISBN 978-1-59184-333-7.
October 18	Calvin Trillin	Quite Enough of Calvin Trillin: Forty Years of Funny Stuff. March 11, 2024. ISBN 978-1-4000-6982-8.
October 19	Al Sharpton	PoliticsNation
October 20	Richard Brookhiser	Brookhiser, Richard (September 27, 2011). James Madison. Basic Books. ISBN 978-0-465-01983-0.
October 24	Kevin Clash	Being Elmo: A Puppeteer's Journey
October 25	Walter Isaacson	Isaacson, Walter (October 24, 2011). Steve Jobs. Simon and Schuster. ISBN 978-1-4516-4853-9.
October 26	Lisa Randall	Randall, Lisa (September 20, 2011). Knocking on Heaven's Door: How Physics and Scientific Thinking Illuminate the Universe and the Modern World. Harper Collins. ISBN 978-0-06-172372-8.
October 27	Andrew Napolitano	It Is Dangerous to Be Right When the Government Is Wrong: The Case for Personal Freedom. Thomas Nelson. March 11, 2024. ISBN 978-1-59555-350-8.
October 31	Mindy Kaling	Kaling, Mindy (March 11, 2024). Is Everyone Hanging Out Without Me? (And Other Concerns). Crown Archetype. ISBN 978-0-307-88626-2.

=== November ===
Date	Guest	Promotion
November 1	Condoleezza Rice	Rice, Condoleezza (March 11, 2024). No Higher Honor: A Memoir of My Years in Washington. Crown Publishers. ISBN 978-0-307-58786-2.
November 2	Tom Brokaw	Brokaw, Tom (March 11, 2024). The Time of Our Lives: A Conversation About America - Who We Are, Where We've Been, and Where We Need to Go Now to Recapture the American Dream. Random House. ISBN 978-1-4000-6458-8.
November 3	Brad Paisley	Paisley, Brad; Wild, David (March 11, 2024). Diary of a Player: How My Musical Heroes Made a Guitar Man Out of Me. Howard Books. ISBN 978-1-4516-2552-3.
November 7	Clint Eastwood	J. Edgar
November 8	Bill Clinton	Back to Work: Why We Need Smart Government for a Strong Economy. Alfred A. Knopf. March 11, 2024. ISBN 978-0-307-95975-1.
November 9	Nancy Pelosi	Minority leader of the United States House of Representatives
November 10	Adam Sandler	Jack & Jill
November 14	Leymah Gbowee	Perseus (September 13, 2011). Mighty Be Our Powers: How Sisterhood, Prayer, and Sex Changed a Nation at War. PublicAffairs. ISBN 978-0-9842951-5-9.
November 15	Mark Kelly	Gabby: A Story of Courage and Hope. Scribner. March 11, 2024. ISBN 978-1-4516-6106-4.
November 16	Diane Keaton	Keaton, Diane (2011). Then Again. Random House. ISBN 978-1-4000-6878-4.
November 17	Martin Scorsese	Hugo
November 28	Merrill Markoe	Cool, Calm & Contentious. March 11, 2024. ISBN 978-0-345-51891-0.
November 29	Betty White	Hot in Cleveland and White, Betty (2011). Betty & Friends: My Life at the Zoo. G.P. Putnam's Sons. ISBN 978-0-399-15754-7.
November 30	Bono	ONE Campaign and (PRODUCT)^{RED}

=== December ===
Date	Guest	Promotion
December 1	Bob Costas	Garner, Joe; Costas, Bob (March 11, 2024). 100 Yards of Glory: The Greatest Moments in NFL History. Houghton Mifflin Harcourt. ISBN 978-0-547-54798-5.
December 5	Ben Lowy	Lowy, Benjamin (March 11, 2024). Iraq - Perspectives. Duke University Press. ISBN 978-0-8223-5166-5.
December 6	Jonah Hill	The Sitter
December 7	Ralph Fiennes	Coriolanus
December 8	Ed Gillespie	Former chair of the Republican National Committee
December 12	Anne Burrell	Burrell, Anne; Lenzer, Suzanne (March 11, 2024). Cook Like a Rock Star: 125 Recipes, Lessons, and Culinary Secrets. Clarkson Potter/Ten Speed. ISBN 978-0-307-88675-0.
December 13	Lawrence Lessig	Republic, Lost: How Money Corrupts Congress--and a Plan to Stop It. Twelve. March 11, 2024. ISBN 978-0-446-57643-7.
December 14	Melody Barnes	Director of the United States Domestic Policy Council
December 15	Matt Damon	We Bought a Zoo
