= Malbin =

Malbin is a surname. Notable people with the surname include:

- Elaine Malbin (born 1929), American soprano
- Michael J. Malbin (born 1943), American politician scientist
