= Annie Lowrey =

American journalist (born 1984)

- Lowrey in 2026
- Born: July 22, 1984 (age 42)
- Education: Harvard University (BA)
- Occupation: Journalist
- Employers: The Atlantic; The New York Times; Slate; The Washington Independent
- Spouse: Ezra Klein (m. 2011)
- Children: 2

Annie M. Lowrey (/ˈlaʊri/; born July 22, 1984) is an American journalist who writes on politics and economic policy for The Atlantic. She is a proponent of universal basic income.

== Career ==
Before joining The Atlantic as a staff writer, Lowrey covered economic policy for The New York Times and served as the Moneybox columnist for Slate. She was also a staff writer for the Washington Independent and was on the editorial staffs of Foreign Policy and The New Yorker.

Lowrey joined Slate in 2010 as part of an effort to revamp their coverage of business and the economy. Lowrey has appeared as a guest on the The Daily Show, PBS News Hour, The Rachel Maddow Show, Morning Joe, Up with Steve Kornacki, Real Time with Bill Maher, and Bloggingheads.tv.

== Personal life ==
Lowrey attended Harvard University. While at Harvard, she wrote for The Harvard Crimson.

Lowrey is married to Ezra Klein, the co-founder of Vox and currently a columnist and podcast host at The New York Times. They have two children, the first born in February 2019 and the second in fall 2021. In 2022, Lowrey wrote about how each of her pregnancies involved significant health complications.

== Writings ==
In 2018, Lowrey published her first book, titled Give People Money: How a Universal Basic Income Would End Poverty, Revolutionize Work, and Remake the World. It was shortlisted for the 2018 Financial Times and McKinsey Business Book of the Year Award. In 2026, she published The Time Tax: How the Government Wastes Our Time—and How to Fix It.
