= List of The Daily Show episodes (2013) =

- No. of episodes: 160

Release
- Original network: Comedy Central

Season chronology
- ← Previous; 2012 episodes Next → 2014 episodes

This is a list of episodes for The Daily Show with Jon Stewart in 2013. Every episode from June 10 until August 15 was guest hosted by John Oliver, as Stewart had left temporarily to direct Rosewater.

== 2013 ==
=== January ===
Original air date	Guest(s)	Promotion
January 7	Anne Hathaway	Les Misérables
January 8	Stanley McChrystal	My Share of the Task. 2013. ISBN 978-1591844754.
January 9	Jeff Bridges	Bridges, Jeff (2012). The Dude and the Zen Master. Blue Rider Press. ISBN 978-0399161643.
January 10	Josh Brolin	Gangster Squad
January 14	Roger Waters	Musician
January 15	Bob Schieffer	Host of Face the Nation
January 16	Jessica Chastain	Zero Dark Thirty
January 17	Lena Dunham	Girls
January 21	Sonia Sotomayor	Sotomayor, Sonia (15 January 2013). My Beloved World. Knopf Doubleday Publishing. ISBN 978-0307594884.
January 22	Jennifer Lopez	Parker
January 23	Missy Cummings	Academic
January 24	Christopher Walken	Stand Up Guys
January 28	Bob Costas	Sportscaster
January 29	Melissa McCarthy	Identity Thief
January 30	Al Gore	The Future: Six Drivers of Global Change. Random House. 2013. ISBN 978-0812992946.
January 31	Jason Bateman	Identity Thief

=== February ===
Original air date	Guest(s)	Promotion
February 4	Michelle Rhee	Rhee, Michelle (2 January 2013). Radical: Fighting to Put Children First. HarperCollins. ISBN 978-0062203984.
February 5	Ray Kelly	New York City Police Commissioner
February 6	Ed Whitacre	Whitacre, Edward (2013). American Turnaround: Reinventing AT&T and GM and the Way We Do Business in the USA. Grand Central. ISBN 978-1455513017.
February 7	Neil Barofsky	Barofsky, Neil (2012). Bailout: An Inside Account of how Washington Abandoned Main Street While Rescuing Wall Street. Simon and Schuster. ISBN 978-1451684933.
February 11	George Stephanopoulos	Good Morning America and This Week
February 12	Mike Piazza	Piazza, Mike (2013). Long Shot. Simon and Schuster. ISBN 978-1439150221.
February 13	Fawzia Koofi	Koofi, Fawzia; Ghouri, Nadene (2012). The Favored Daughter: One Woman's Fight to Lead Afghanistan into the Future. St. Martin's Press. ISBN 978-0230120679.
February 14	Susan Rice	United States Ambassador to the United Nations
February 19	Alison Brie	Community
February 20	Helaine Olen	Olen, Helaine (2012). Pound Foolish: Exposing the Dark Side of the Personal Finance Industry. Portfolio/Penguin. ISBN 978-1591844891.
February 21	Steven Brill	Law Writer. TIME Magazine article "Bitter Pill: Why Medical Bills Are Killing Us"
February 25	Donnie Wahlberg	Boston's Finest
February 26	Lori Silverbush & Kristi Jacobson	A Place at the Table
February 27	R. J. Cutler	The World According to Dick Cheney
February 28	Rachel Maddow	Drift: The Unmooring of American Military Power. Crown. 2012. ISBN 978-0307460981.

=== March ===
Original air date	Guest(s)	Promotion
March 4	Paul Rudd	Admission
March 5	Sandra Day O'Connor	Out of Order: Stories from the History of the Supreme Court. Random House. 2013. ISBN 978-0812993929.
March 6	Neil deGrasse Tyson	Tyson, Neil Degrasse (2013). Space Chronicles: Facing the Ultimate Frontier. W.W. Norton. ISBN 978-0393343625.
March 7	Tom Coughlin	Coughlin, Thomas Richard; Coughlin, Tom; Fisher, David (2013). Earn the Right to Win: How Success in Any Field Starts with Superior Preparation. Portfolio/Penguin. ISBN 978-1591846123.
March 25	Peter Dinklage	Game of Thrones
March 26	Michael Moss	Salt Sugar Fat: How the Food Giants Hooked Us. 2013. ISBN 978-1400069804.
March 27	Eva Mendes	The Place Beyond the Pines
March 28	Denise Kiernan	The Girls of Atomic City. ISBN 978-1451617528.

=== April ===
Original air date	Guest(s)	Promotion
April 1	Mary Roach	Gulp: Adventures on the Alimentary Canal. 2013. ISBN 978-0393081572.
April 2	Jonathan Sperber	Karl Marx: A Nineteenth-Century Life. ISBN 978-0871404671.
April 3	Sheryl Sandberg	Lean In: Women, Work, and the Will to Lead. Knopf. 2013. ISBN 978-0385349949.
April 4	Danny Boyle	Trance
April 8	David Stockman	The Great Deformation: The Corruption of Capitalism in America. PublicAffairs. 2013. ISBN 978-1586489120.
April 9	Jimmy Carter	Former President of the United States and Nobel Peace Prize winner.
April 10	Ken Burns	The Central Park Five
April 11	Edie Falco	Nurse Jackie
April 16	Tom Cruise	Oblivion
April 17	Ricky Gervais	Comedian and Actor
April 18	Mark Mazzetti	Mazzetti, Mark (2013). The Way of the Knife: the CIA, a Secret Army, and a War at the Ends of the Earth. Penguin Press. ISBN 978-1594204807.
April 22	Christina Hendricks	Mad Men
April 23	Salman Rushdie	Midnight's Children
April 24	Bassem Youssef	"Egypt's Jon Stewart", Satirist/host in El Bernameg; Time 100 Most Influential People In The World (2013)
April 25	Vali Nasr	Nasr, Seyyed Vali Reza (2013). The Dispensable Nation: American Foreign Policy in Retreat. Doubleday. ISBN 978-0385536479.
April 29	Jon Hamm	Mad Men
April 30	Robert Downey Jr.	Iron Man 3

=== May ===
Original air date	Guest(s)	Promotion
May 1	Kay Bailey Hutchison	Hutchison, Kay Bailey (9 April 2013). Unflinching Courage: Pioneering Women Who Shaped Texas. HarperCollins. ISBN 978-0062130693.
May 2	Eric Greitens	CEO of The Mission Continues
May 6	Christiane Amanpour	CNN's Chief International Correspondent
May 7	Mindy Kaling	The Mindy Project
May 8	Carey Mulligan	The Great Gatsby
May 9	David Sedaris	Let's Explore Diabetes with Owls. 2013. ISBN 978-0316154697.
May 13	J. J. Abrams	Star Trek Into Darkness
May 14	Nathan Lane	The Nance
May 15	Olympia Snowe	Snowe, Olympia (2013). Fighting for Common Ground: How We Can Fix the Stalemate in Congress. Hachette Books. ISBN 978-1602862173.
May 16	George Packer	Packer, George (21 May 2013). The Unwinding: An Inner History of the New America. Macmillan. ISBN 978-0374102418.
May 20	Elliot Page	The East
May 21	Phil Jackson	Jackson, Phil; Delehanty, Hugh (2013). Eleven Rings: The Soul of Success. Penguin. ISBN 978-1594205118.
May 22	Bill O'Reilly	O'Reilly, Bill (2013). Keep It Pithy: Useful Observations in a Tough World. Crown. ISBN 978-0385346627.
May 23	Morgan Freeman	Now You See Me

=== June ===
Original air date	Guest(s)	Promotion
June 3	Maxim Pozdorovkin & Mike Lerner	Pussy Riot: A Punk Prayer
June 4	Brian Williams	Anchor and Managing Editor of NBC Nightly News
June 5	Jon Favreau	Former Head Speechwriter for President Obama
June 6	No Guest	-
June 10†	Seth Rogen	This is the End
June 11†	Armando Iannucci	Veep
June 12†	Mavis Staples	One True Vine
June 13†	Fareed Zakaria	Fareed Zakaria GPS
June 17†	Linda Cardellini	Mad Men
June 18†	Jim Gaffigan	Dad Is Fat. Crown Archetype. 2013. ISBN 978-0385349055.
June 19†	Dawn Porter	Gideon's Army, regarding public defenders
June 20†	Tom Brokaw	Brokaw, Tom (2011). The Time of Our Lives: A Conversation About America. Random House Large Print. ISBN 978-0739326831.
June 24†	Maggie Gyllenhaal	White House Down
June 25†	Questlove	Thompson, Ahmir "Questlove"; Greenman, Ben (2013). Mo' Meta Blues: The World According to Questlove. Grand Central. ISBN 978-1455501359.
June 26†	Josh Fox	Gasland Part II
June 27†	Tom Goldstein	SCOTUSblog

† These episodes were hosted by John Oliver

=== July ===
Original air date	Guest(s)	Promotion
July 15†	Aaron Sorkin	The Newsroom
July 16†	Helen Mirren	Red 2
July 17†	Reza Aslan	Aslan, Reza (16 July 2013). Zealot: The Life and Times of Jesus of Nazareth. Random House Publishing. ISBN 978-1400069224.
July 18†	Sarah Vowell	Rakoff, David (16 July 2013). Love, Dishonor, Marry, Die, Cherish, Perish: A Novel. National Geographic Books. ISBN 978-0385535212.
July 22†	Louis C.K.	Blue Jasmine
July 23†	Richard Haass	Foreign Policy Begins at Home: The Case for Putting America's House in Order. ISBN 978-0465057986.
July 24†	Shailene Woodley	The Spectacular Now
July 25†	Bob Bradley	Manager of Egypt's National Soccer Team
July 29†	Mark Leibovich	This Town: Two Parties and a Funeral-Plus, Plenty of Valet Parking!-in America's Gilded Capital. Penguin Group (USA). 2013. ISBN 978-0399161308.
July 30†	Tim Gunn	Project Runway
July 31†	Hank Azaria	Lovelace

† These episodes were hosted by John Oliver

=== August ===
Original air date	Guest(s)	Promotion
August 1†	Colin Quinn	Unconstitutional
August 5†	Neal Thompson	A Curious Man: The Strange and Brilliant Life of Robert "Believe It or Not!" Ripley. 2013. ISBN 978-0770436209.
August 6†	Liam Hemsworth	Paranoia
August 7†	Lake Bell	In a World...
August 8†	Kirsten Gillibrand	US Senator (D-NY)
August 12†	Rand Paul	Government Bullies: How Everyday Americans Are Being Harassed, Abused, and Imprisoned by the Feds. ISBN 978-1455522750
August 13†	Joshua Oppenheimer	The Act of Killing
August 14†	Regis Philbin	Television personality
August 15†	Simon Pegg	The World's End

† These episodes were hosted by John Oliver

=== September ===
Original air date	Guest(s)	Promotion
September 3	Andrew Harper	United Nations High Commissioner for Refugees representative to Jordan
September 4	Mario Livio	Brilliant Blunders: From Darwin to Einstein - Colossal Mistakes by Great Scientists That Changed Our Understanding of Life and the Universe. ISBN 978-1469286044.
September 5	Michael C. Hall	Dexter
September 9	Sheri Fink	Fink, Sheri (2013). Five Days at Memorial: Life and Death in a Storm-Ravaged Hospital. Crown Publishers. ISBN 978-0307718969.
September 10	Bill Dedman	Dedman, Bill; Paul Clark Newell, Jr (10 September 2013). Empty Mansions: The Mysterious Life of Huguette Clark and the Spending of a Great American Fortune. Random House Publishing. ISBN 978-0345534521.
September 11	Bob Odenkirk & David Cross	Cross, David; Odenkirk, Bob (2013). Hollywood Said No!: Orphaned Film Scripts, Bastard Scenes, and Abandoned Darlings from the Creators of Mr. Show. Grand Central. ISBN 978-1455526307.
September 12	Billy Crystal	Still Foolin' 'Em: Where I've Been, Where I'm Going, and Where the Hell Are My Keys?. Holt & Company, Henry. 2013. ISBN 978-0805098204.
September 16	Robert Reich	Inequality for All
September 17	Jake Gyllenhaal	Prisoners
September 18	Hugh Jackman	Prisoners
September 19	Chelsea Clinton	Clinton Foundation
September 24	Richard Dawkins	Dawkins, Richard (24 September 2013). An Appetite for Wonder: The Making of a Scientist. HarperCollins. ISBN 978-0062287151.
September 25	Atoms for Peace	Amok
September 26	Robin Williams	The Crazy Ones
September 30	Bill O'Reilly	Killing Jesus. Henry Holt & Co. 2013. ISBN 978-0805098549.

=== October ===
Original air date	Guest(s)	Promotion
October 1	David Mitchell	The Reason I Jump. Random House. 2013. ISBN 978-0812994865.
October 2	Sandra Bullock	Gravity
October 3	Kerry Washington	Scandal
October 7	Kathleen Sebelius	United States Secretary of Health and Human Services
October 8	Malala Yousafzai	Yousafzai, Malala; Lamb, Christina (2013). I am Malala. Weidenfeld & Nicolson. ISBN 978-0297870920.
October 9	Michael Fassbender	12 Years a Slave
October 10	Brian Jay Jones	Jim Henson: The Biography. ISBN 978-0345526113.
October 21	Alan Greenspan	Greenspan, Alan (2013). The Map and the Territory: Risk, Human Nature, and the Future of Forecasting. Penguin. ISBN 978-1594204814.
October 22	Malcolm Gladwell	David and Goliath: Underdogs, Misfits, and the Art of Battling Giants. Little, Brown and Company. 2013. ISBN 978-0316204361.
October 23	Charles Krauthammer	Things That Matter: Three Decades of Passions, Pastimes and Politics. 2013. ISBN 978-0385349178.
October 24	Chiwetel Ejiofor	12 Years a Slave
October 28	Nick Offerman	Offerman, Nick (2013). Paddle Your Own Canoe: One Man's Fundamentals for Delicious Living. Penguin. ISBN 978-0525954217.
October 29	Debbie Wasserman Schultz	Member of the United States House of Representatives, Chairwoman of the Democratic National Committee
October 30	Diane Ravitch	Reign of Error: The Hoax of the Privatization Movement and the Danger to America's Public Schools. 2013. ISBN 978-0385350884.
October 31	Mark Fainaru-Wada	League of Denial: The NFL, Concussions and the Battle for Truth. ISBN 978-0804128193.

=== November ===
Original air date	Guest(s)	Promotion
November 4	Bob Woodruff	Journalist
November 5	John Goodman	Alpha House
November 6	Monique Brinson Demery	Demery, Monique (2013). Finding the Dragon Lady: The Mystery of Vietnam's Madame Nhu. PublicAffairs. ISBN 978-1610392815.
November 7	Patrick Stewart	No Man's Land, Waiting For Godot
November 11	Doris Kearns Goodwin	The Bully Pulpit: Theodore Roosevelt, William Howard Taft, and the Golden Age of Journalism. Simon & Schuster. 2013. ISBN 978-1416547860.
November 12	Joe Scarborough	Scarborough, Joe (2013). The Right Path: From Ike to Reagan, How Republicans Once Mastered Politics and Can Again. Random House. ISBN 978-0812996142.
November 13	Keegan-Michael Key and Jordan Peele	Key & Peele
November 14	Geoffrey Rush	The Book Thief
November 18	Elizabeth Olsen	Oldboy
November 19	Bill Cosby	Bill Cosby: Far From Finished
November 20	Tom Brokaw	Where Were You?
November 21	Jennifer Lawrence	The Hunger Games: Catching Fire

=== December ===
Original air date	Guest(s)	Promotion
December 2	Ian McKellen	The Hobbit: The Desolation of Smaug, No Man's Land, Waiting For Godot
HealthCare.gov Relaunch, Black Friday Violence, British B&B and Anti-Gay Discrimination
December 3	Jared Leto	Dallas Buyers Club
War on Christmas, Republican National Committee and the End of Racism
December 4	Jehane Noujaim	The Square
Bad Mortgage Settlements, Samantha Bee & Blackstone Fraud
December 5	Jorge Ramos	Univision
Fast Food Worker Strike, Minimum Wage Raise, Bill de Blasio & New York's Millionaires
December 9	Husain Haqqani	Haqqani, Husain (5 November 2013). Magnificent Delusions. PublicAffairs. ISBN 978-1-6103-9317-1.
The Truth About NSA Surveillance, Government Spying in World of Warcraft, Reaction to Nelson Mandela's Death
December 10	Amy Adams	American Hustle
Historically Ineffective Congress, Jason Jones on Gerrymandering, The Obama-Castro Handshake
December 11	Reza Aslan	Zealot: The Life and Times of Jesus of Nazareth
Bipartisan Budget Agreement, Jason Jones in Budget Battle Movies, Iranian Nuclear Agreement
December 12	Evangeline Lilly	The Hobbit: The Desolation of Smaug
War on Christmas, Black Santa and White Jesus, Lewis Black & Twerking Robots
December 16	Haifaa al-Mansour	Wadjda
Black Santa & Megyn Kelly, The Knockout Game, China on the Moon
December 17	Erik Prince	Prince, Erik (28 October 2014). Civilian Warriors: The Inside Story of Blackwater and the Unsung Heroes of the War on Terror. Penguin. ISBN 978-1-5918-4745-8.
Conservative Budget Critics, John Boehner's Catchphrase, The Real-Life Hunger Games
December 18	Steve Carell, Will Ferrell, David Koechner & Paul Rudd	Anchorman 2: The Legend Continues
John C. Beale (EPA fraudster), IKEA Spying Scandal
December 19	Jonah Hill	TBA
Royal Phone Hacking Scandal, John Oliver's Goodbye
