= Michael J. Malbin =

Michael J. Malbin (born June 9, 1943) is a professor of Political Science (emeritus) at the University at Albany, The State University of New York. He was also the founding director of the Campaign Finance Institute (CFI) in Washington DC from 1999 until he retired from that position in 2020. (In 2018 the Campaign Finance Institute became a division of the National Institute on Money in Politics. In 2021 the National Institute merged with the Center for Responsive Politics to become OpenSecrets.) His co-authored books while at CFI included The Election After Reform: Money, Politics and the Bipartisan Campaign Reform Act (2006), Life After Reform: When the Bipartisan Campaign Reform Act Meets Politics (2003), and Vital Statistics on Congress, co-authored with Norman Ornstein and Thomas E. Mann.

During 1997–98, Malbin was a guest scholar at The Brookings Institution, where he finished The Day after Reform: Sobering Campaign Finance Lessons from the American States (co-authored by Thomas L. Gais.) From 1990 to 1998 he was director of the Center for Legislative and Political Studies at SUNY's Rockefeller Institute, where he was the principal investigator for Presidential-Congressional Relations for a collaborative, multi-university project funded by the National Science Foundation to create a congressional history database. Earlier books include Limiting Legislative Terms (1992), Money and Politics in the United States (1984), Parties, Interest Groups, and Campaign Finance Laws (1980), Unelected Representatives: Congressional Staff and the Future of Representative Government (1980), and Religion and Politics: The Intentions of the Authors of the First Amendment (1978).

Before joining the University at Albany's faculty in 1990, Malbin worked for the joint U.S. House and Senate Iran-Contra Committee (1987), the House Republican Conference (1988), and as speechwriter to the Secretary of Defense (1989–90). He was also a presidential appointee to the National Humanities Council from 1990 to 1994 and a visiting professor at Yale University (1996). Before government service, he was a resident fellow at The American Enterprise Institute for Public Policy Research (1977–86) and a reporter for National Journal (1973–77).

Malbin was born in Brooklyn, New York on June 9, 1943. He has an A.B. from Cornell University in philosophy, began his graduate studies in political science at the University of Chicago (1964–66), and received a Ph.D. in government from Cornell University (1973). He is married and has three children.

== See also ==
- Campaign finance reform in the United States
