= Abel Klein =

American mathematician (born 1945)

- Born: January 16, 1945 (age 81); Rio de Janeiro, Brazil
- Children: Ezra Klein

Academic background
- Education: Universidade Federal do Rio de Janeiro; Massachusetts Institute of Technology
- Thesis: Regularity and Covariance Properties of Quantum Fields with Applications to Currents and Generalized Free Fields
- Doctoral advisor: Irving Segal

Academic work
- Discipline: Mathematics
- Sub-discipline: Mathematical physics
- Institutions: Instituto de Matemática Pura e Aplicada; University of California, Irvine
- Main interests: Random Schrödinger operators

Abel Klein (born January 16, 1945) is a Brazilian-American mathematician, specializing in mathematical physics and, more specifically, random Schrödinger operators for disordered systems.

== Biography ==
He received in 1971 his PhD from the Massachusetts Institute of Technology under the supervision of Irving Segal with the thesis Regularity and Covariance Properties of Quantum Fields with Applications to Currents and Generalized Free Fields. Klein was from 1971 to 1972 an adjunct assistant professor at the University of California, Los Angeles, and from 1972 to 1974 an instructor at Princeton University. At the University of California, Irvine's mathematics department, he was from 1974 to 1977 an assistant professor and from 1977 to 1982 an associate professor, and from 1982 to 2022 a full professor; from 1996 to 1999 he was the chair of the department.

Random Schrödinger operators describe an electron moving in a medium with random impurities. In the widely accepted picture, in three or more dimensions there exists a transition from an insulator region, characterized by localized states, to a very different metallic region, characterized by extended states, while in one or two dimensions there are only localized states and no metal-insulator transition. Klein's research aims to further the mathematical understanding of this picture.

Klein is the author or coauthor of more than 120 articles. In 2012 he was elected a Fellow of the American Mathematical Society.
