= Matthew Long (firefighter) =

Matthew Long (born 1966) is a New York City firefighter who was hit by a charter bus on December 22, 2005 while riding his bicycle to work during a transit worker strike. Long recovered from his injuries, and was included on the list of the world's 25 fittest men published by Men's Fitness in 2010. Despite suffering chronic pain and his right leg being slightly shorter than his left he completed the New York City Marathon in 2008 in a time of seven hours, 21 minutes.

He published his first book, The Long Run: A New York City Firefighter's Triumphant Comeback from Crash Victim to Elite Athlete in 2010 (ISBN 160529246X). It was co-authored by Charles Butler.

Long appeared on The Daily Show with Jon Stewart on August 16, 2011 to promote his book.
