= Thomas E. Mann =

American political scientist (born 1944)

- Born: September 10, 1944 (age 81); Milwaukee, Wisconsin, U.S.
- Education: University of Florida; University of Michigan

Thomas E. Mann (born September 10, 1944) is the W. Averell Harriman Chair and a senior fellow in Governance Studies at the Brookings Institution, a non-partisan think tank based in Washington, D.C. He primarily studies and speaks on U.S. elections, campaign finance reform, Senate and filibuster reform, Congress, redistricting, and political polarization.

== Biography ==
He was born in Milwaukee, Wisconsin, and attended the University of Florida, where in 1966 he received a B.A. in political science, then went on to get an M.A. (1968) and Ph.D. (1977) at the University of Michigan. He first went to Washington D.C. in 1969, and worked there as a Congressional Fellow in the offices of Senator Philip A. Hart and Representative James G. O'Hara, both Democrats.

Between 1987 and 1999, he was Director of Governance Studies at Brookings. Before that, Mann was executive director of the American Political Science Association.

In 1989, Mann was elected as a fellow of the National Academy of Public Administration. Mann is a fellow of the American Academy of Arts and Sciences and a member of the Council on Foreign Relations. He is a recipient of the American Political Science Association’s Frank J. Goodnow and Charles E. Merriam Awards.

== Bibliography ==
- Unsafe at Any Margin: Interpreting Congressional Elections (1978)
- Media Polls in American Politics, co-editor with Gary R. Orren (1992)
- Renewing Congress, with Norman J. Ornstein (1992, 1993)
- Values and Public Policy, co-editor with Henry J. Aaron and Timothy Taylor (1994)
- Congress, the Press, and the Public, co-editor with Norman J. Ornstein (1994)
- Intensive Care: How Congress Shapes Health Policy, co-editor with Norman J. Ornstein (1995)
- Campaign Finance Reform: A Sourcebook, with Anthony Corrado, Daniel R. Ortiz, Trevor Potter, and Frank J. Sorauf, eds. (1997)
- Vital Statistics on Congress, 1999-2000, with Norman J. Ornstein and Michael Malbin (1999)
- The Permanent Campaign and Its Future, co-editor with Norman J. Ornstein (2000)
- Governance for a New Century: Japanese Challenges, American Experience, co-editor with Sasaki Takeshi
- Vital Statistics on Congress, with Norman J. Ornstein and Michael J. Malbin (2002)
- Inside the Campaign Finance Battle: Court Testimony on the New Reforms, co-editor with Anthony Corrado and Trevor Potter (2003)
- The New Campaign Finance Sourcebook, co-editor with Anthony Corrado, Daniel R. Ortiz, and Trevor Potter (2003)
- The Broken Branch: How Congress Is Failing America and How to Get It Back on Track co-authored with Norman J. Ornstein (2006)
- It's Even Worse Than It Looks: How the American Constitutional System Collided With the New Politics of Extremism, with Norman J. Ornstein (Basic Books, May 2012) ISBN 978-0-465-03133-7
- One Nation After Trump: A Guide for the Perplexed, the Disillusioned, the Desperate, and the Not-Yet Deported, with E. J. Dionne and Norman J. Ornstein (St. Martin's Press, September 2017) ISBN 978-1-250-16405-6
