= Maria Goodavage =

American writer and journalist

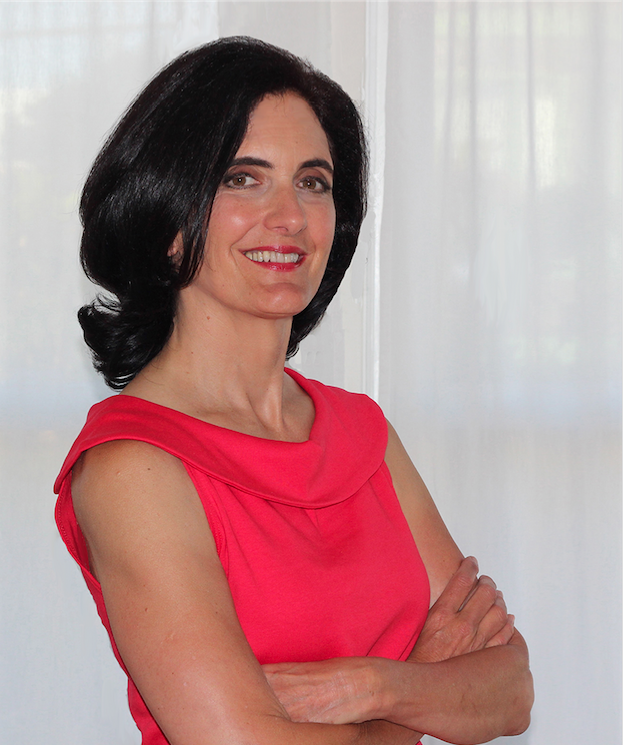
- Maria Goodavage
- Education: Northwestern University
- Occupations: journalist, author, editor
- Writing career
- Notable work: Soldier Dogs Top Dog
- Website: mariagoodavage.com

Maria Goodavage is a journalist and editor, and author of two New York Times best selling books about military dogs. Goodavage has been a staff writer for USA Today and the San Francisco Chronicle among other newspapers.

== Authorship ==
On April 5, 2012, her book, Soldier Dogs: The Untold Story of America’s Canine Heroes was recorded at #15 on the Publishers Weekly Bestsellers list. On April 15, 2012, Soldier Dogs landed on The New York Times Best Seller list, coming in at No. 11 on the hardcover list. On March 27, 2012, she appeared on The Daily Show, with Jon Stewart.

Her second book about military dogs was published in October 2014. Top Dog: The Story of Marine Hero Lucca, was the cover story for Parade magazine on September 27, 2014, and the book was featured on the Today show just before the Macy's Thanksgiving Day Parade on November 27, 2014. Top Dog became Goodavage's second New York Times Best Seller in November when it ranked #4 on its monthly list for animal books.

Her book Secret Service Dogs: The Heroes Who Protect the President of the United States, is due to be published by Dutton/Penguin October 25, 2016. Goodavage gained unprecedented access to the United States Secret Service canine program during the research of the book.

Goodavage's father, Joseph F. Goodavage, was also a book author.

== Published works ==
- Top Dog: The Story of Marine Hero Lucca, Dutton Penguin, 2014. ISBN 978-0525954361
- Soldier Dogs: The Untold Story of America’s Canine Heroes, Dutton Penguin, 2012. ISBN 978-0525952787
- The Dog Lover's Companion to California: The Inside Scoop on Where to Take Your Dog, Avalon Travel Publishing 2011. ISBN 978-1598807431
- The Dog Lover's Companion to the San Francisco Bay Area: The Inside Scoop on Where to Take Your Dog, Avalon Travel Publishing, 2011. ISBN 978-1598807448
