= Identity fusion =

When membership in a social group begins to define one's own sense of self

Identity fusion, a psychological construct rooted in social psychology and cognitive anthropology, is a form of alignment with groups in which members experience a visceral sense of oneness with the group. The construct relies on a distinction between the personal self (characteristics that make someone a unique person, such as height, age, or personality) and the social self (characteristics that align the person with various groups, such as common nationalities, interests, or motivations). As the name suggests, identity fusion involves the union of the personal and social selves. When fusion occurs, both the personal and social selves remain salient and influential but the boundaries between them become highly permeable. In addition, the theory proposes that fused persons come to regard other group members as "family" and develop strong relational ties to them as well as ties to the collective. Therefore, fused persons are not just bound to the collective; they are tied to the individual members of the collective.

The potency of the personal self and relational ties distinguish identity fusion from other forms of alignment with groups, such as "group identification", in which allegiance to the collective eclipses the personal self and relational ties to other group members. Because of this, the personal self and relational ties are not as involved in theories of group identification. Identity fusion theorizes that fusion measures should be more predictive of extreme pro-group behavior than previously proposed measures of identification. In fact, there is growing evidence of this. Measures of identity fusion are particularly powerful predictors of personally costly pro-group behaviors, including endorsement of extreme behaviors, such as fighting and dying for the group.

== Theoretical foundations ==
The identity fusion construct builds upon earlier work by emphasizing aspects of the relationship of people to groups that were de-emphasized within the social identity perspective (i.e., social identity theory and self-categorization theory). Like social identity theory, identity fusion theory rests on the distinction between the personal and social identities. However, the social identity approach assumes that there is a hydraulic relationship between personal and social identities. That is, the increases in the salience and influence of one identity diminishes the salience and influence of the other. One important implication of this assumption is that as the group identity becomes salient and apt to guide behavior, the personal identity becomes less salient and less likely to guide behavior. In contrast, the theory of identity fusion theory proposes that both the personal and social identities of a person can be salient and influential simultaneously.

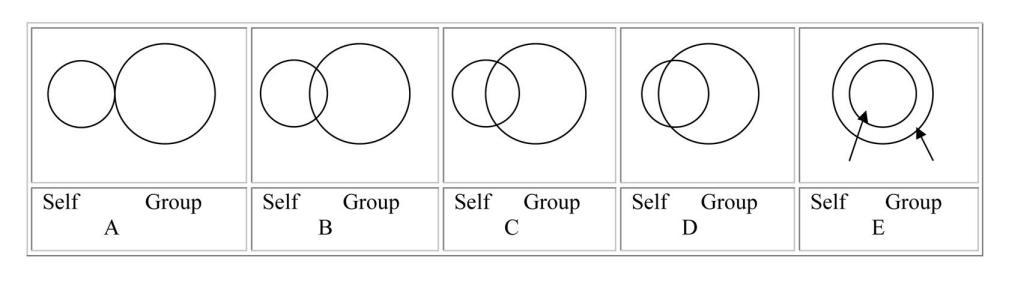
Pictorial Scale Measure of Identity Fusion. Individuals who are "fused" with their group would select option 'E'

Social identity theory also suggests that group members are only linked to one another through their allegiance to the collective; theoretically, personal relationships between group members do not foster identification with the group (with the exception of one study). In contrast, fused individuals feel deeply connected to other group members as individuals, as well as to the larger group as a whole. This is reflected in measures of identify fusion. For example, the verbal measure of identity fusion taps feelings of reciprocal strength between the individual and the group (e.g., "I am strong because of my group"; "I would do more for my group than any other group members would do") as well as feelings of oneness with the group (e.g., "I am one with my group"; "My group is me").

== The four principles ==
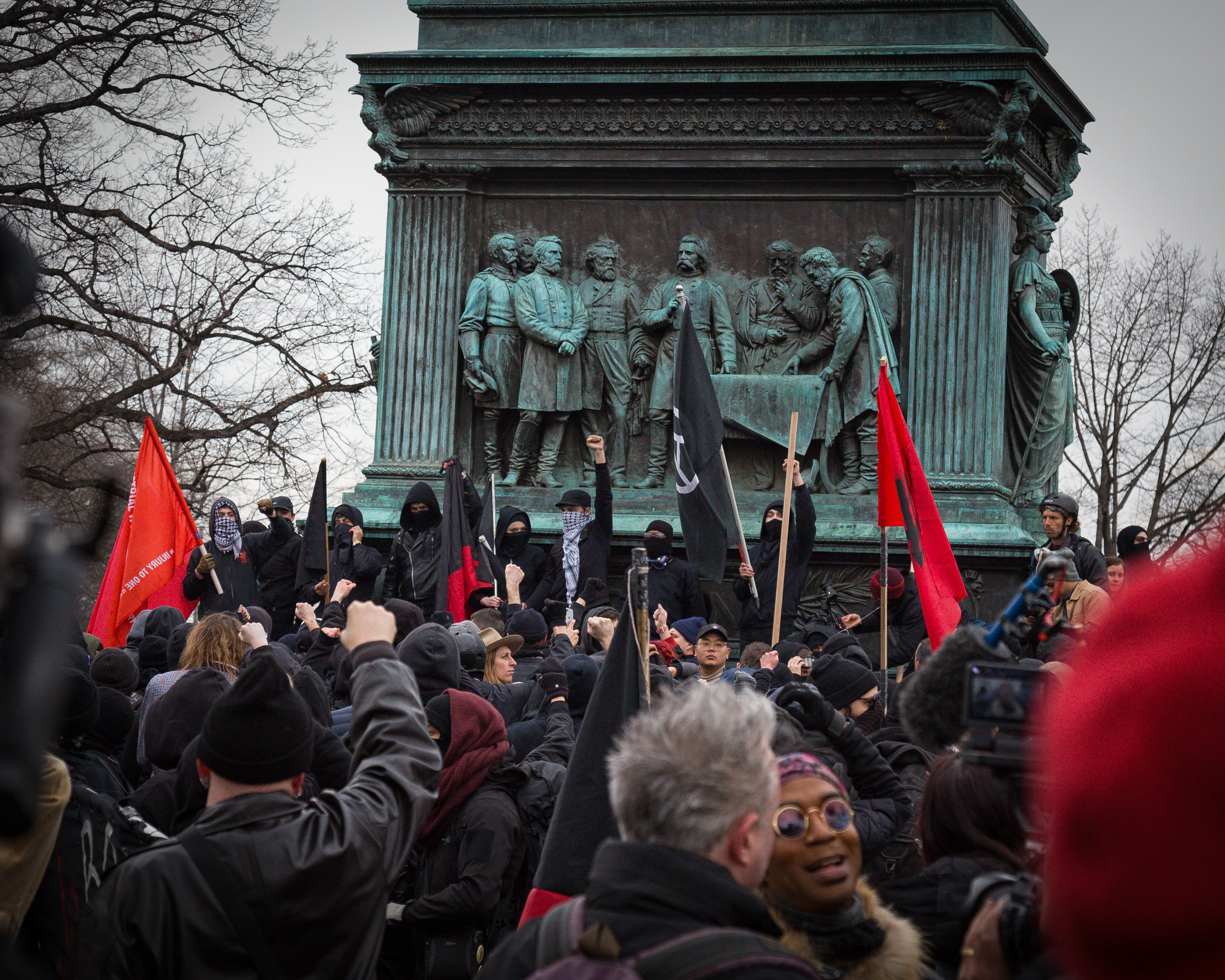
During protests and demonstrations, crowds often are able to act as a cohesive force

The characteristics of identity fusion theory have been summarized in the form of four principles:

1. Agentic-personal self principle: When identity-fused individuals become strongly aligned with a group, they are assumed to maintain an active and agentic personal self, even when the social self is activated. Consistent with this idea, activating the personal self by increasing physiological arousal, or encouraging people to think about how they would react if they were personally threatened, may increase the person's endorsement of extreme pro-group sacrifices. In contrast, the social identification perspective assumes that the personal and social selves are hydraulically related to one another. As such, activating the personal self should diminish endorsement of pro-group behavior. However, this was not the case for strongly fused individuals, who actually demonstrated the exact opposite effect.
2. Identity synergy principle: The fact that the personal and social selves can be activated independently raises the possibility that they may combine synergistically to motivate pro-group behavior. Consistent with this possibility, studies have shown that the activation of either the personal self or social self amplifies the willingness of strongly fused persons to behave in a pro-group fashion. For example, activating the personal self by ostracizing participants from the group based on their personal preferences, or activating the social self by ostracizing participants based on their group membership, resulted in the amplification of endorsement of pro-group action for strongly, but not weakly, fused individuals. Thus, unlike social identity theory which assumes that the personal self does not play a role in pro-group behavior, fusion theory holds that pro-group behaviors are motivated by both the personal and social selves and these two types of self-knowledge may sometimes work together.
3. Relational ties principle: The fusion approach assumes that strongly fused persons care not only about their collective ties to the group (as an abstract entity), but also their relationships (real or imagined) with other members of the group. Identity Fusion Theory posits that strongly fused individuals feel kin-like bonds with other group members, even ones with whom they may have had little or no contact. Several studies have garnered empirical support for the relational ties principle. Using several interpersonal variations of the classic trolley dilemma, individuals who were strongly fused with their country endorsed saving fellow countrymen by jumping to their deaths in front of a speeding trolley. Moreover, fused participants endorsed pushing aside a fellow countryman who was poised to jump to his death to ultimately benefit the group, and instead jumping themselves. This research suggests that highly fused persons are so strongly aligned with their fellow group members that they would prefer that they themselves die rather than a fellow group member. Additionally, when highly fused individuals learn that other group members might be killed in a hypothetical trolley dilemma, they demonstrate emotional reactions similar to how people react when a family member is in distress. These emotional reactions predicted subsequent endorsements of self-sacrifice for the group. In comparison, the social identity approach assumes that, when the social identity is salient, individuals view their fellow group members as mere interchangeable exemplars of the group (i.e. they evaluate other group members based on their "collective ties" toward the group).
4. Irrevocability principle: The fusion approach assumes that, once developed, fusion will remain largely stable over time. This stability persists even in varying situations. Identity fusion theory proposes that this is due to the strong emotions, beliefs, and intra-relationships experienced by the strongly fused individuals. That is, although the overall fusion of a group of persons may shift in response to powerful situational forces, the rank orderings of individuals within the group will remain stable. Researchers have tested the "once fused, always fused" hypothesis by comparing the temporal stability of fusion-with-country scores for highly fused individuals with those of moderately or weakly fused individuals. The stability coefficients for highly fused participants were significantly higher than the coefficients associated with weakly or moderately fused participants. Even when ostracized strongly fused individuals will go to serious lengths to reaffirm their steadfastness to the group.

More recent iterations of identity fusion theory have emphasised the primacy of the "Identity synergy principle" over the other principles.

== Consequences ==
=== Endorsement of extreme pro-group behaviors ===
Since the experimental study of actual extreme pro-group acts raises large ethical red flags, researchers have largely focused on endorsements of extreme pro-group acts. Several studies have shown that fusion is a robust predictor of willingness to fight and die on behalf of one's group. Other research has examined responses to variations of the trolley dilemma adapted for groups. In scenarios that pitted the desire for self-preservation against self-sacrifice for others, strongly fused persons were especially willing to endorse sacrificing their lives for fellow in-group members (but not for out-group members). Using a different approach, researchers examined group members' reactions to significant group losses and found that highly identified individuals tend to detach themselves from the group following a group failure, whereas strongly fused persons predicted that they would "go down with the ship". For example, in parallel studies of the 2008 presidential elections in Spain and the United States, people who were strongly fused with their political party internalized both victory and defeat, but highly identified persons internalized only victory. Additional field research with terrorist groups like ISIS and rebel groups is also beginning to shed light on the role identity fusion plays in extreme pro-group behaviors.

=== Engagement in personally costly, pro-group behaviors ===
In addition to predicting endorsement of extreme pro-group behaviors, research suggests that fusion is a predictor of a variety of personally costly pro-group behaviors in the real world.

Additional research has shown that fusion could also be a strong predictor of group-directed helping behaviors. In some studies, individuals donated money to the group. In others, they provided social and emotional support to fellow group members. Other research has also suggested that strongly fused individuals are especially willing to go out of their way to protect the group and maintain its integrity. For instance, strongly fused employees were more likely to report having "blown the whistle" sometime during their employment. Presumably, such whistle-blowing activity was motivated by a conviction that their actions would ultimately benefit the group. Another study found that students who were strongly fused with their university were willing to whistle-blow against a cheating fellow student despite the cost of time, energy, and the possibility of retaliation from the cheater.

=== Willingness to interact with outgroups ===
More recent research has turned to investigating the positive outcomes of identity fusion. In particular, there has been an emphasis on viewing identity fusion in the context of the attachment theory concept of a "secure base", which empowers group members to interact more confidently with others. The nature of these interactions (i.e., cooperation or violence) is largely determined by whether the outgroup is perceived to be a threat. For instance, empirical evidence suggests that strongly fused people are more willing to trust members of benign outgroups than weakly fused people.

== Local versus extended fusion ==
Since Charles Darwin, the willingness of some humans to sacrifice themselves for genetically unrelated members of the same large, diffuse group (such as a religion or a nation) has raised a theoretical challenge. Social psychological perspectives have contended that such sacrifices are motivated by commitment to the larger collective whereas anthropological perspectives have contended that such sacrifices are triggered by commitment to other members of the group. The distinction between local and extended fusion provides an explanation for these apparently competing explanations. Local fusion is proposed to occur in relatively small, homogeneous groups whose members attach to each other through direct personal contact (e.g., families or work teams). In contrast, extended fusion occurs in relatively large groups whose members do not all have personal relationships (e.g., political parties or nation states). In extended fusion, even though fused individuals may not actually know all of their fellow group members, they still feel like they know them and even think of them as like family.

In short, identity fusion theory posits that fused people project feelings of relational ties they have with known group members onto unknown group members. The projection of relational ties explains why fused individuals are sometimes willing to make sacrifices for members of large heterogeneous groups that most people would make only for small, tight-knit groups. Through the process of projection, they psychologically transform genetically unrelated individuals into kin.

== Mechanisms ==
=== Shared essence ===
Although most fusion research to date has focused on the nature and consequences of fusion, recent research has revealed some starting points for understanding the causes of fusion. Perceptions of shared essence, the belief that one shares essential core qualities with the group, appears to be a key building block of identity fusion. Perceptions of shared essence arise in different ways in local and extended fusion. In local fusion, individuals have direct experiences with other group members that foster the conclusion that they share essential qualities with those individuals. In extended fusion, the perception of psychological kinship is fostered by the presence of certain characteristics that are perceived as fundamental to who the person is. For example, people are more likely to fuse with large extended groups when they become convinced that members of the group share with them genes or core values, especially if they hold those values sacred.

=== Invulnerability ===
The relational ties principle of fusion suggests that highly fused individuals will feel that they and other group members synergistically strengthen each other. This perception of reciprocal strength should foster the perception that together, members of the group are uniquely invulnerable. These feelings of invulnerability may serve to insulate strongly fused individuals from fully recognizing the risks associated with extreme acts. Perceptions of invulnerability have been shown to mediate the effects of fusion on endorsement of pro-group behavior.

=== Agency ===
The identity synergy principle of fusion assumes that the borders between the personal and social selves are highly permeable for strongly fused individuals. These porous borders encourage people to channel their personal agency into group behavior, raising the possibility that strongly fused individuals will channel their feelings of personal agency into pro-group behavior. Perceptions of agency have been shown to mediate the effect of fusion on pro-group behavior.

=== Shared experience ===
A study found that groups that share painful or strong negative experiences can cause visceral bonding, and pro-group behavior.

== See also ==
- Psychology of self – Study of the representation of one's identity
- Self-categorization theory – Theory in social psychology
- The True Believer – Book by Eric Hoffer
- Out-group homogeneity – Perception of out-group members as being similar to each other
- Populism – Political ideology emphasising the "common people"
  - Trumpism – American right-wing to far-right populist political ideology
