= It's Even Worse Than It Looks =

2012 book by Thomas E. Mann

- First edition hardcover image
- Author: Thomas E. Mann; Norman J. Ornstein
- Language: English
- Subject: Politics of the United States; Political parties in the United States; Political polarization
- Genre: Non-fiction
- Publisher: Basic Books
- Publication date: May 1, 2012
- Publication place: United States
- Pages: 240
- ISBN: 9780465031337
- Preceded by: The Broken Branch: How Congress Is Failing America and How to Get It Back on Track (2006)

It's Even Worse Than It Looks: How the American Constitutional System Collided With the New Politics of Extremism is a 2012 book of political analysis authored by Thomas E. Mann of the Brookings Institution and Norman J. Ornstein of the American Enterprise Institute, published by Basic Books. In the work, they detail controversial issues surrounding the United States Congress and determine that the institution has become weakened to the point of being almost completely useless. The general political polarization and specific rise of hard-line ideological views have, in the authors' opinion, created such social division that the nation's federal system as a whole finds itself essentially unable to govern. Specifically, the authors criticize the U.S. Republican Party as becoming captured by a dogmatic right-wing fringe and functioning as "an insurgent outlier" in terms of the general American political spectrum.

The book has received praise from various publications such as The Economist and The Hill.

The 2016 paperback version of the book featured a cover stating It's Even Worse Than It Was and included additional comments by the authors remarking upon the past few years after the first edition came out.

== Background ==
Ornstein and Mann have previously collaborated on The Broken Branch. Both worked in Washington D.C. for more than forty years. Ornstein has written columns for Roll Call and served as an election analyst for CBS News.

== Synopsis ==
The authors analyze the current U.S. Congress, and they conclude that the lawmaking body is now almost completely ineffectual. Two sources of the problem are given. The first is the serious mismatch between the two major parties, the Democrats and the Republicans, in their view. They state that the groups "have become as vehemently adversarial as parliamentary parties, and [in] a governing system that, unlike a parliamentary democracy, makes it extremely difficult for majorities to act".

Mann and Ornstein specifically criticize the rightward shift of the Republican Party, highlighting the use of administrative and parliamentary tricks as a means of avoiding clear votes on certain issues. The authors describe the party as "an insurgent outlier – ideologically extreme; contemptuous of the inherited social and economic policy regime; scornful of compromise; unpersuaded by conventional understanding of facts, evidence and science; and dismissive of the legitimacy of its political opposition."

== Reception and reviews ==
The book was published several months before the 2012 United States presidential election. Its publication, especially at a time of heightened public political interest, brought attention to the asymmetry between the parties' tactics for winning elections and the tendency for the media to succumb to false equivalence in political reporting. Prior to the book's release, the authors were routinely cited as nonpartisan, balanced sources by the national press.

The Economist gave the book a mostly favorable review, saying that Mann and Ornstein had "devoted a good deal of thought to ways the system can be rescued and improved, to their great credit." The book's "constructive ideas" received additional praise.

The Hill journalist Juan Williams described the book as insightful and praised the authors, writing that the work "fillets the traditional media for perpetuating a principle of false equivalence in its coverage of the two parties,...masking the GOP's unalloyed march toward the fringes of the right wing."

Michael Brissenden of the Australian Broadcasting Corporation also lauded the book, writing, "Two respected centrist scholars, Norman Ornstein and Thomas Mann, have written a book that moves past the bland and lazy conventional wisdom. They argue, with a truckload of evidence, that the blame in Washington lies overwhelmingly with Republicans...Our national politics has turned a strange corner. And it is a cop-out to say that both parties are equally to blame. Strained attempts to be evenhanded distort the reality we face...The book is titled It's Even Worse Than It Looks and it is both fascinating and alarming."

The book received renewed attention in 2021, as its analysis was applied with some accuracy to the political situation at the time.

== See also ==
- 2012 in literature
- Political polarization
- Politics of the United States
- Why We're Polarized
