= E. J. Dionne =

American journalist (born 1952)

- Dionne in 2026
- Born: Eugene Joseph Dionne Jr. Boston, Massachusetts, U.S.
- Education: Harvard University (BA); Balliol College, Oxford (DPhil)
- Occupations: Author, columnist
- Spouse: Mary Boyle
- Children: 3
- Writing career
- Subjects: Religion, history, politics, left-wing politics

Eugene Joseph Dionne Jr. (/diˈɒn/) is an American journalist, political commentator, and was a long-time op-ed columnist for The Washington Post. He is also a senior fellow in governance studies at the Brookings Institution, a professor in the Foundations of Democracy and Culture at the McCourt School of Public Policy of Georgetown University, and an NPR, MSNBC, and PBS commentator.

== Early life and education ==
Dionne was born in Boston, Massachusetts, and raised in Fall River, Massachusetts. He is the son of the late Lucienne (née Galipeau), a librarian and teacher, and Eugène J. Dionne, a dentist. He is of French-Canadian descent. He attended Portsmouth Abbey School (then known as Portsmouth Priory), a Benedictine college preparatory school in Portsmouth, Rhode Island.

Dionne graduated in 1973 with a B.A., summa cum laude, in social studies from Harvard University, where he was elected to Phi Beta Kappa and was affiliated with Adams House. He also earned a D.Phil. in sociology in 1982 from Balliol College, Oxford, where he was a Rhodes Scholar.

== Career ==
External videos
- Booknotes interview with Dionne on Why Americans Hate Politics, August 25, 1991, C-SPAN

Dionne's published works include the influential 1991 bestseller Why Americans Hate Politics, which argued that several decades of political polarization was alienating a silent centrist majority. It was characterized as radical centrist by Time. Later books include They Only Look Dead: Why Progressives Will Dominate the Next Political Era (1996), Stand up Fight Back: Republican Toughs, Democratic Wimps, and Politics of Revenge (2004), Souled Out: Reclaiming Faith and Politics After the Religious Right (2008), Our Divided Political Heart: The Battle for the American Idea in an Age of Discontent (2012), and One Nation After Trump: A Guide for the Perplexed, the Disillusioned, the Desperate and the Not-Yet Deported (2017), coauthored with Norman J. Ornstein and Thomas E. Mann. His most recent book is Code Red: How Progressives and Moderates Can Unite to Save Our Country (2020).

Dionne is a columnist for Commonweal, a liberal Catholic publication, and is a Contributing Opinion Writer for The New York Times. Before becoming a columnist for the Post in 1993, he worked as a reporter for that paper as well as The New York Times. He has joined the left-liberal The National Memo news-politics website.

== Personal life ==
Dionne with his wife, Mary, in 2026

Dionne lives in Bethesda, Maryland, with his wife, Mary Boyle; they have three children.

== Writings ==
- Why Americans Hate Politics. New York: Simon & Schuster, 1991. ISBN 978-0671682552.
- They Only Look Dead: Why Progressives Will Dominate the Next Political Era. New York: Simon & Schuster, 1996. ISBN 978-0684807683.
- Community Works: The Revival of Civil Society in America (editor). Washington, D.C.: Brookings Institution, 1998 ISBN 0815718675.
- Stand Up, Fight Back: Republican Toughs, Democratic Wimps, and the Politics of Revenge. New York: Simon & Schuster, 2004. ISBN 978-0743258586.
- Souled Out: Reclaiming Faith and Politics After the Religious Right. Princeton: Princeton University Press, 2008. ISBN 0691134588.
- Our Divided Political Heart: The Battle for the American Idea in an Age of Discontent. New York: Bloomsbury, 2012. ISBN 1608192016.
- Why the Right Went Wrong: Conservatism from Goldwater to the Tea Party and Beyond. New York: Simon & Schuster, 2016. ISBN 978-1476763798.
- One Nation After Trump: A Guide for the Perplexed, the Disillusioned, the Desperate, and the Not-Yet Deported. With Norman J. Ornstein and Thomas E. Mann. New York: St. Martin's Press, 2017. ISBN 9781250164056.
- Code Red: How Progressives and Moderates Can Unite to Save Our Country. New York: St. Martin's Press, 2020. ISBN 9781250256478.
