= Norman Ornstein =

American political scientist

Norm Ornstein
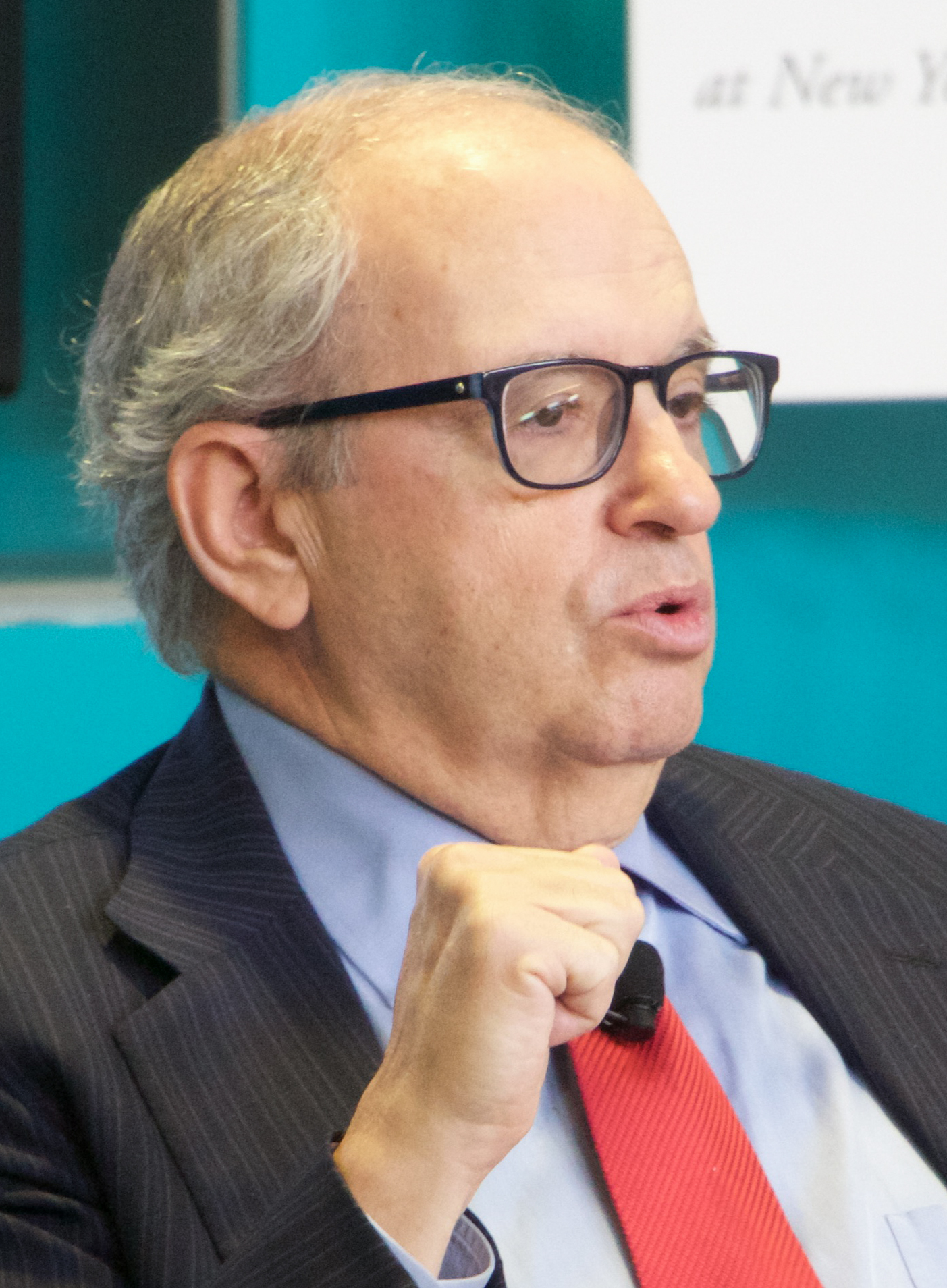
- Born: Norman Jay Ornstein; October 14, 1948 (age 77); Grand Rapids, Minnesota, U.S.
- Education: University of Minnesota (BA); University of Michigan (MA, PhD)
- Political party: Democratic
- Spouse: Judith Harris
- Children: 2

Norman Jay Ornstein (/ˈɔːrnstiːn/; born October 14, 1948) is an American political scientist and an emeritus scholar at the American Enterprise Institute (AEI), a Washington, D.C., conservative think tank. He is the co-author, with Thomas E. Mann, of It's Even Worse Than It Looks: How the American Constitutional System Collided With the New Politics of Extremism.

== Biography ==
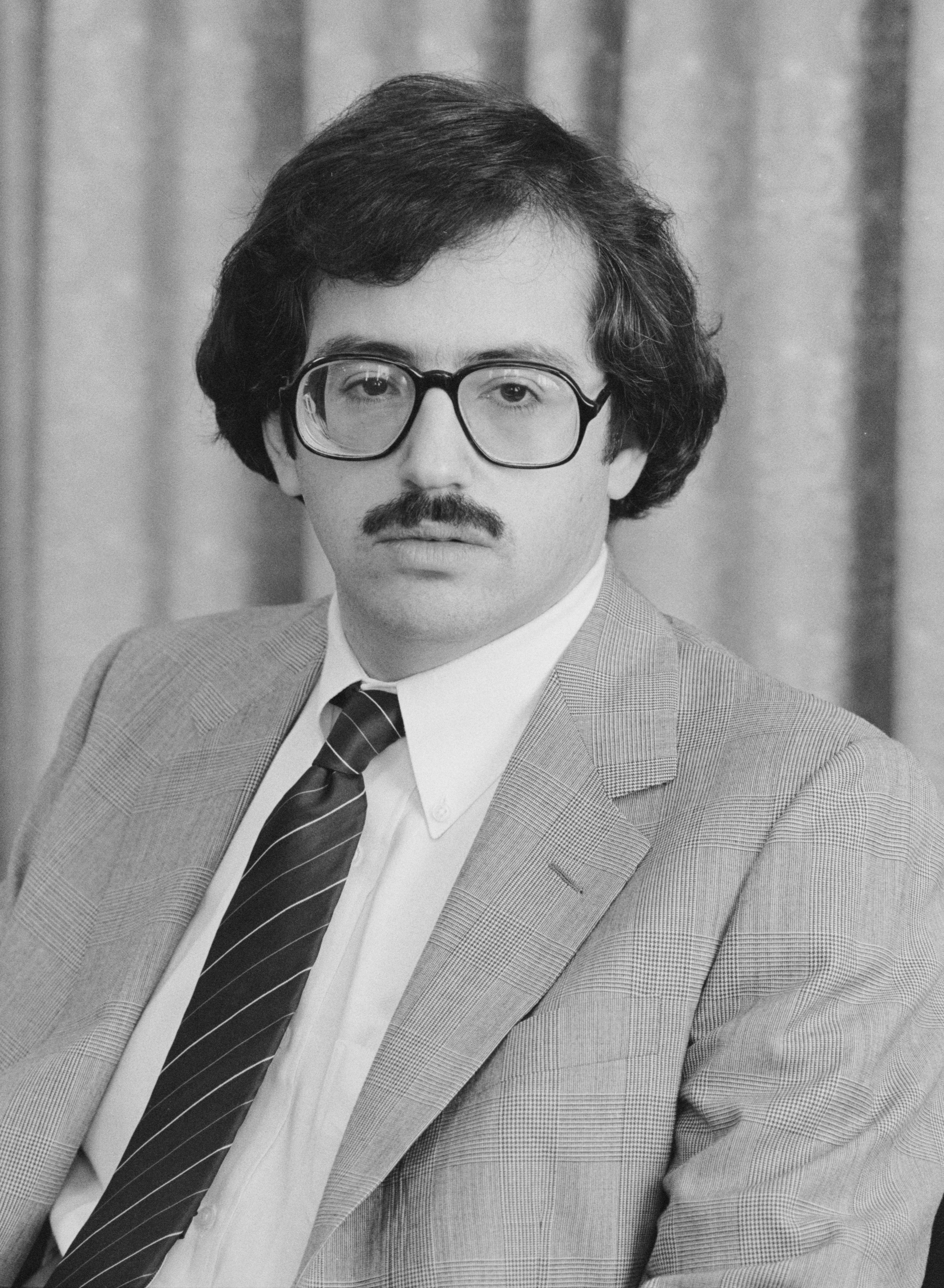
Ornstein in 1981

Norman Jay Ornstein was born in Grand Rapids, Minnesota, on October 14, 1948. His father was a traveling salesman, and the family spent much of Norman's childhood in Canada. He was a child prodigy, graduating from high school when he was fourteen and from college when he was eighteen. He received his BA from the University of Minnesota, and subsequently, received a PhD in political science from the University of Michigan in 1974. By the mid-1970s, he had become a professor of political science at Catholic University in Washington, D.C., and was establishing a reputation as an expert on the United States Congress.

Ornstein studies American politics and is a frequent contributor to The Washington Post and many magazines, such as The Atlantic and the National Journal. He wrote a weekly column for Roll Call from 1993 until April 10, 2013, and was co-director, with Thomas E. Mann, of the AEI-Brookings Election Reform Project. He helped draft key parts of the Bipartisan Campaign Reform Act of 2002, also known as the McCain-Feingold Act. Ornstein is a registered Democrat but considers himself a centrist and has voted for individuals from both parties.

Ornstein is a member of the advisory board of the Future of American Democracy Foundation, a nonprofit, nonpartisan foundation in partnership with Yale University Press and the Yale Center for International and Area Studies "dedicated to research and education aimed at renewing and sustaining the historic vision of American democracy". He also served on the advisory board of the Institute for Law and Politics at the University of Minnesota Law School. Ornstein is also a member of the board of directors of the nonpartisan election reform group Why Tuesday? He is on the advisory council of the cross-partisan grassroots campaign Represent.Us, where he served as a consultant in the crafting of the American Anti-Corruption Act.

Foreign Policy named Ornstein, together with Thomas E. Mann, one of its 2012 Top 100 Global Thinkers "for diagnosing America's political dysfunction".

As of 2013, Ornstein has become known for "blistering critiques of Congress", which he has been following for the past three decades.

He opposed President Donald Trump. He also criticized the Electoral College, saying that the more that presidents are elected without the popular vote, "the more you get the sense that voters don’t have a say in the choice of their leaders".

== Personal ==
Ornstein is married to Judith L. Harris, a litigation attorney specializing in regulatory matters. He is a longtime friend of former U.S. senator and comedian Al Franken. A fictional version of Ornstein appears in Franken's political spoof novel Why Not Me? as the campaign manager for Franken's improbable presidential run.

Ornstein and his wife, as well as their younger son, Danny, established the Matthew Harris Ornstein Memorial Foundation in memory of the couple's elder son, who died in 2015 at age 34 from accidental carbon monoxide poisoning.

== Works ==
External videos
- Booknotes interview with Ornstein on Debt and Taxes, March 13, 1994, C-SPAN
- Panel discussion on The Broken Branch, July 12, 2006, C-SPAN
- Discussion with Ornstein and Thomas E. Mann on The Broken Branch, April 30, 2007, C-SPAN
- Interview with Ornstein and Mann on The Broken Branch, January 27, 2011, C-SPAN
- Panel discussion with Ornstein and Mann on It's Even Worse Than It Looks, May 9, 2012, C-SPAN
- Washington Journal interview with Ornstein and Mann on It's Even Worse Than It Looks, May 23, 2012, C-SPAN
- Presentation by Ornstein on One Nation After Trump, November 18, 2017, C-SPAN

- Ornstein, Norman (1975). Congress in change : evolution and reform. New York: Praeger. ISBN 978-0-275-10050-6. OCLC 1093142.
- Mann, Thomas E.; Ornstein, Norman J. (1981). The New Congress. Washington: American Enterprise Institute for Public Policy Research. ISBN 978-0-8447-3415-6. OCLC 6915350.
- Ornstein, Norman J.; Kohut, Andrew; McCarthy, Larry (1988). The people, the press & politics : the Times Mirror study of the American electorate. Times Mirror company. Reading, Mass.: Addison-Wesley. ISBN 978-0-201-09358-2. OCLC 17442216.
- Ornstein, Norman J.; Perlman, Mark (1991). Political power and social change : the United States faces a united Europe. Washington, D.C.: AEI Press. ISBN 978-0-8447-3757-7. OCLC 23940691.
- Berns, Walter; Ornstein, Norman J; Diamond, Martin (1992). After the people vote : a guide to the electoral college (Rev. and enl. ed.). Washington, D.C.: AEI Press. ISBN 978-0-8447-3803-1. OCLC 24379864.
- Ornstein, Norman J.; Pope, Jeremy C. (1996). Campaign Finance : an Illustrated Guide. Washington: American Enterprise Institute for Public Policy Research. ISBN 978-0-8447-7108-3. OCLC 922978724.
- Ornstein, Norman J. (1997). Lessons and legacies : farewell addresses from the Senate. Eisenhower World Affairs Institute. Reading, Mass.: Addison-Wesley Pub. ISBN 978-0-201-69579-3. OCLC 35686160.
- Ornstein, Norman J.; Mann, Thomas E. (2000). The permanent campaign and its future. Washington, D.C.: American Enterprise Institute. ISBN 978-0-8447-4133-8. OCLC 70731759.
- Mann, Thomas E.; Ornstein, Norman J. (2008). The broken branch : how Congress is failing America and how to get it back on track. Annenberg Foundation Trust at Sunnylands., Annenberg Public Policy Center. (2008 ed.). Oxford: Oxford University Press. ISBN 978-0-19-536871-0. OCLC 259115054.
- Mann, Thomas E.; Ornstein, Norman J. (2012). It's even worse than it looks : how the American constitutional system collided with the new politics of extremism. New York: Basic Books. ISBN 978-0-465-03133-7. OCLC 755699560.
- Dionne, E. J.; Ornstein, Norman J.; Mann, Thomas E. (2017). One Nation After Trump: A Guide for the Perplexed, the Disillusioned, the Desperate, and the Not-Yet Deported. St. Martin's Press. ISBN 978-1-250-16405-6. OCLC 1005504853.
