= Eric Engberg =

American broadcast journalist (1941-2016)

- Born: Eric Jon Engberg; September 18, 1941; Highland Park, Illinois
- Died: March 27, 2016 (aged 74)
- Education: West Ridge grade school, Highland Park, IL; Highland Park High School (Highland Park, Illinois), 1959; University of Missouri School of Journalism, B.J. 1963
- Occupation: broadcast journalist
- Employers: 1963–1968 KFRU, Columbia, Missouri; 1968–1969 WTOP-FM-TV, Washington, D.C.; April 1969– WMAL-AM-FM, Washington; 1972– Group-W; Feb 17, 1976– CBS News, New York, Dallas; 1981–2002 CBS News, Washington
- Known for: Bernard Goldberg's book Bias listed Engberg's reportage as media bias; breaking Spiro T. Agnew's plea agreement (1973); "Reality Check" segment on the CBS Evening News ~1992–~2002; 1998 forcing identification of Vietnam War's Unknown Soldier
- Spouse: Judith Ann Klein Engberg
- Children: three sons: Eric Robin Engberg; Jason Evans Engberg; Mark A Engberg
- Awards: Sigma Delta Chi awards: 1973? radio spot news reporting; 1998 television investigative journalism Investigative Reporters and Editors; 1998 for Tomb of the Unknowns
- Website: www.ericengberg.com

Eric Jon Engberg (September 18, 1941 – March 27, 2016) was an American correspondent who worked for CBS News from 1976 to 2003.

== Life ==
Engberg attended Highland Park High School (Class of 1959) in Highland Park, Illinois. He graduated from the University of Missouri School of Journalism.

He worked at WTOP-TV; WTOP-FM; WTOP from 1968 to 1972, then moved to Group W from 1972 until he joined CBS in 1976.

Bernard Goldberg listed, as a central example of media bias, an Engberg CBS Evening News Reality Check segment that ridiculed the flat tax proposal of Steve Forbes. Goldberg leveled this charge in his book, Bias: A CBS Insider Exposes How the Media Distort the News, and elsewhere.

Engberg wrote disparagingly of the candidates' performance in the 2000 presidential debates. He cautioned that anonymous sources are often misleading.

Engberg died at his home in Palmetto, Florida, on March 27, 2016.

== Awards ==
During his career Engberg received several awards for his reporting, including 1973’s Sigma Delta Chi distinguished service award in Radio Reporting and 1998 Investigative Reporters and Editors award, and 1999 Alfred I. duPont–Columbia University Award silver baton award.
