= 100 People Who Are Screwing Up America =

2005 non-fiction book by Bernard Goldberg

- Cover of 100 People Who Are Screwing Up America
- Author: Bernard Goldberg
- Language: English
- Genre: Non-fiction
- Published: 2005
- Publication place: United States
- Media type: Print

100 People Who Are Screwing Up America (and Al Franken is #37) is a non-fiction book by conservative pundit Bernard Goldberg that was published in 2005. The book's central idea is to name and blame a long list of specific individuals whom Goldberg implicates in making the United States a "far more selfish, vulgar, and cynical place." In 2006, Goldberg updated his book, releasing 110 People Who Are Screwing Up America.

== Description and synopsis ==
Goldberg's book denounces many people—mostly left-of-center celebrities, politicians and newscasters—and takes umbrage at high-profile incidents like Janet Jackson's exposing herself "in front of one-fifth of all the kids in America under age eleven" during the Super Bowl XXXVIII halftime show (p. vi). It decries as "Hollywood blowhards" actors who call American politicians "Nazis" while praising "dictators like Fidel Castro" (pp. vii–ix). Goldberg's chapter for Courtney Love is simply the word "ho".

Other people (on the cover) include: filmmaker Michael Moore (#1), Democratic leader Howard Dean, reverend Al Sharpton, and rapper Eminem.

The book takes aim at "liberals [who are] snooty, snobby know-it-alls, who have gotten angrier and angrier in recent years and who think they're not only smarter, but also better, than everyone else, especially everyone else who lives in a 'red state'—a population they see as hopelessly dumb and pathetically religious" (p. x). While the book mainly criticizes liberals, there are a few moderate and even conservative individuals mentioned, notably Michael Savage and Rush Limbaugh.

The subtitle, "and Al Franken is #37", is likely a response to Al Franken's Lies and the Lying Liars Who Tell Them, which contains a chapter entitled, "I Bitch-Slap Bernie Goldberg", focused on debunking Goldberg's previous book Bias: A CBS Insider Exposes How the Media Distort the News.

== Reception ==
=== Favorable ===
Jonah Goldberg (no relation), editor of National Review, said the following of the book: "Goldberg is no down-the-line conservative, and you are certain to disagree with some of his choices and rankings -- and probably also with his often salty language. Nevertheless, 100 People Who Are Screwing Up America is a rollicking and revealing look at 100 of the most egregious obstacles on the path of our nation's return to glory."

A review by Brent Bozell, President of the conservative Media Research Center, also offered praise for the book: "100 People Who Are Screwing Up America is out, and it's a wonderful read for anyone not on that list."

"It's easy to presume that this is the conservatives' answer to recent published tirades against the right by leftists like Franken and Michael Moore, but there are important distinctions," wrote Bozell. "First, Goldberg doesn't limit the list to those on the Left. Jimmy Swaggart makes the list, as does Michael Savage. Many in the religious Right will quarrel with his selection of Judge Roy Moore. All should applaud his choice of David Duke."

=== Unfavorable ===
In a review in The New York Times, Richard Brookhiser wrote, "Such books are part of the puppet theater of modern political discourse" and that "any clever and combative person could write 80 percent of this book, or its mirror image, in a weekend." Brookhiser also questioned the legitimacy of the book's arguments, given that the successes of many in the list are made possible by the public. He rhetorically asked: "Shouldn't Goldberg's book be 270 Million People Who Are Screwing Up America?"

==== Conservative vs. liberal selections ====
Cathy Young, whom Goldberg praised in the book for her criticism of radical feminism, has argued that the conservatives on Goldberg's list are either "safe" targets who are not powerful or influential in conservative circles, or "tokens" inserted to create the appearance that Goldberg is not being partisan. She suggests that discredited televangelist Jimmy Swaggart, for instance, is a "safe" alternative to Pat Robertson, who is still a fixture on the Christian right. Responding to Goldberg's assertions that he is not taking political sides, Young questions why his criticisms of "haters" who "demonize" their opponents extends to multiple individuals on the left, but only a single conservative, talk radio host Michael Savage. Young suggests that Ann Coulter would belong on the list, but Goldberg only mentions her by way of making a favorable comparison to Savage. Young also suggests that Goldberg employs a double standard in defending Coulter because she offers invective "with a twinkle in her eye" while simultaneously dismissing the notion that some of Al Franken's statements should be taken less seriously because he is engaging in satire.

==== Factual inaccuracies regarding rap music ====
Goldberg received criticism of his inclusion of rappers in the book. The book incorrectly attributes the creation of gangsta rap to the record label Interscope Records; "gangsta rap" had been around commercially for at least six years prior to any involvement from the record label. Artists such as Ice-T and N.W.A both had platinum-selling success as gangsta rap artists before the founding of Interscope. The book claims that Interscope Records was entirely funded by Ted Field, when it was actually to a large extent—as much as 50%—funded by Atlantic Records.

==== Jon Stewart criticism ====
On July 13, 2005, Goldberg appeared on The Daily Show with Jon Stewart to promote the book. Jon Stewart, a liberal, criticized the list for suggesting that liberals who do not hold positions of power, such as Barbra Streisand, were responsible for problems in America, while conservatives who held powerful positions in the Bush Administration or Republican Congress were not held responsible for anything. Goldberg agreed that the list included more liberals than conservatives but responded that his book dealt with cultural issues. Stewart also argued that the book focused on a "culture war" he sees as largely "fabricated," and that declining rates of homicide and teen drug use suggest that, in fact, American culture is not as troubled as Goldberg suggests. Stewart argued that people who "say a bad word on television" don't affect people's lives, while government officials do. "I wish smart guys like you spent less time worrying about Barbra Streisand and more time worrying about Richard Perle or Karl Rove, or whoever the Democrats had in those positions during the Clinton years," Stewart said. Goldberg argued in response that the culture is important and that he intended the book to raise the public discourse because many of the people on his list had turned public debate into bickering and name-calling.

== Responses ==
Some of those included on the list have responded to the book humorously. Cartoonists Jeff Danziger and Ted Rall both said it was "an honor" to be included on the list, with the latter adding, "Not only am I grouped with many people whom I admire for their achievements and patriotism, I'm being demonized by McCarthyite thugs I despise." Entrepreneur Todd Goldman quipped that he "hope[s] to be ranked higher next year."

Goldberg's book prompted a response from Jack Huberman, who wrote 101 People Who Are Really Screwing America (and Bernard Goldberg is Only #73).

Matt Kunitz (executive producer of Fear Factor and No. 69 in Goldberg's book) told the Los Angeles Times, "I look at my company; I think Michael Moore was No 1. I don't mind being in that group of people."

Ten new entries were added in Goldberg's 2006 update, 110 People Who Are Screwing Up America. Among these are the white nationalist band Prussian Blue, anti-homosexual preacher Fred Phelps, spam mailer Jeremy Jaynes, former United States Attorney General and lawyer-activist Ramsey Clark, and several Supreme Court Justices.

Barbara Kingsolver responded to her inclusion on the list in her book Animal, Vegetable, Miracle. She joked about the inclusion and said that she was proud to be on the list with people such as Jimmy Carter.

The book was referenced in the manifesto of Jim David Adkisson, the gunman who killed two people and wounded seven others in the Knoxville Unitarian Universalist church shooting.
