= 101 People Who Are Really Screwing America =

2006 non-fiction book by Jack Huberman

- Book cover
- Author: Jack Huberman
- Language: English
- Subject: Politics
- Genre: Non-fiction
- Published: 2006 (Nation)
- Publication place: United States
- Pages: 352
- ISBN: 1-56025-875-6
- OCLC: 69118364
- Preceded by: The Bush-Hater's Handbook

101 People Who Are Really Screwing America (and Bernard Goldberg is only #73) is a non-fiction book by Jack Huberman. It was published in 2006 by Nation Books. The book is a liberal response to Bernard Goldberg's book 100 People Who Are Screwing Up America, and includes criticism of Republican politicians including George W. Bush, Dick Cheney, Donald Rumsfeld, and Rick Santorum. The book received positive reception in Publishers Weekly and The Nation. Reference & Research Book News called the book "the liberal polemical riposte" of 100 People Who Are Screwing Up America.

The book includes quotes attributed to American radio host and conservative political commentator Rush Limbaugh, without providing a date or details about the quotes. When Limbaugh was in dealings to purchase a portion of the St. Louis Rams, an American football team, in 2009, the quotes were reported in the St. Louis Post-Dispatch. Limbaugh disputed the quotes. The author of the book and its publisher both declined to comment to the Associated Press. Legal analysts told Fox News Channel that Limbaugh could have a case for a libel lawsuit.

== Author ==
In June 2006, Jack Huberman resided in New York City. Prior to authoring 101 People Who Are Really Screwing America, Huberman wrote the book The Bush-Hater's Handbook: a Guide to the Most Appalling Presidency of the Past 100 Years. He is also the author of Bushit: An A-Z Guide to the Bush Attack on Truth, Justice, Equality, and the American Way. Huberman was born in Montreal, Quebec, Canada, where he spent his early life.

== Contents ==
The book is a liberal response to Bernard Goldberg's 100 People Who Are Screwing Up America. The top-listed individuals are typically Republican politicians, such as George W. Bush, Dick Cheney, Donald Rumsfeld, and Rick Santorum, and conservative judges such as Clarence Thomas and Antonin Scalia. Cheney is ranked in first place, and Bush in second. Others criticized in the book include Ann Coulter, Laura Schlessinger, drivers of SUVs, editors of The Wall Street Journal, Fox News Channel, J.K. Rowling, Dan Brown, and Candace Bushnell. Bernard Goldberg is ranked number 73 in the book, as in the subtitle, itself a reference to the subtitle of Goldberg's original book: "And Al Franken is #37."

== Reception ==
A review in Publishers Weekly described the book as a "droll and acerbic refresher course on the issues confronting the 21st-century United States". The review concluded: "Though Huberman takes his readers' sympathies for granted, the unabashedly leftwing bias and sheer breadth of this frontal assault on Republican politics and culture are factually convincing. ... overall Huberman serves up a frothy indictment to warm liberal innards." Reference & Research Book News characterized the book as a "the liberal polemical riposte" of 100 People Who Are Screwing Up America by Bernard Goldberg. The book was highlighted in the blog "Editor's Cut" published by The Nation. Writing for The Nation, Katrina Vanden Heuvel commented: "In this witty book, Huberman lays out in well-researched detail the interlocking relationships within the vast rightwing agenda to undermine our democratic institutions for profit and prophesy."

== 2009 Rush Limbaugh quote controversy ==
A quote on page 232 of the book is attributed to American radio host and conservative political commentator Rush Limbaugh: "Let’s face it, we didn’t have slavery in this country for over 100 years because it was a bad thing. Quite the opposite: Slavery built the South. I’m not saying we should bring it back. I’m just saying it had its merits. For one thing, the streets were safer after dark." Huberman's book does not provide a date for the quote or any other details about it. Another quote from page 232 of the book attributed to Limbaugh is "You know who deserves a posthumous Medal of Honor? James Earl Ray. We miss you, James. Godspeed." Ray assassinated Martin Luther King Jr.

In 2009, Limbaugh was in dealings to purchase a portion of the American football team, the St. Louis Rams. In the context of reporting on Limbaugh's attempts to purchase the St. Louis Rams, the quote attributed to Limbaugh in the book was printed in the St. Louis Post-Dispatch in October 2009. The St. Louis Post-Dispatch did not attempt to verify the quote, beyond its attribution to Limbaugh in the book. The quote also appeared attributed to Limbaugh in other news publications, including the Detroit Free Press, and The Washington Post. The quote was repeated on CNN and MSNBC. In a program on MSNBC, Rachel Maddow attributed the quote involving James Earl Ray from the Huberman book to Limbaugh.

Limbaugh initially stated he was unable to recall saying the statement in the quotes in question. After Limbaugh's staff researched the quotes and were unable to find reference to them other than the book, Limbaugh emailed the Associated Press a statement: "The totally made-up and fabricated quotes attributed to me in recent media reports are outrageous and slanderous." Limbaugh stated on his radio program: "There's a quote out there that I first saw it in the St. Louis Post-Dispatch last week that I somehow, some time ago, defended slavery and started cracking jokes about it. And, you know, you say a lot of things in the course of 15 hours a week, over the course of 21 years. We've gone back, we have looked at everything we have. There is not even an inkling that any words in this quote are accurate. It's outrageous, but it's totally predictable. It's being repeated by people who have never listened to this program, they certainly didn't hear it said themselves because it was never said." The reporting of the quote and its attribution to Limbaugh hurt his attempts to purchase the St. Louis Rams.

On October 14, 2009, Limbaugh was dropped from the group attempting to buy the St. Louis Rams, due to the controversy of his participation in the deal. According to chairman of the St. Louis Blues hockey team Dave Checketts, who was behind the group attempting to purchase the St. Louis Rams, Limbaugh's participation in the endeavor had become a "complication and a distraction". James Taranto of The Wall Street Journal reported that the quotes may have originated in September 2005 from a blogger who initially discovered them on a Wikipedia page. Toby Harnden of The Daily Telegraph reported that the quotes originated on Wikipedia and Wikiquote, prior to making it into Huberman's book.

On October 15, 2009, the Associated Press contacted Huberman as well as the book's publisher, and asked for the source of the quotes. Huberman told the Associated Press he had no comment about the source of the quotes, and the book's publisher also declined to comment. The Huffington Post had previously published the quote in a blog post by Huberman where he excerpted a portion of his book on the website. The Huffington Post later deleted the offending quotes from Huberman's post, and posted an "Editor's Note", which stated that Huberman was not able to substantiate the quotes he had attributed to Limbaugh: "An earlier version of this post contained quotes attributed to Rush Limbaugh, which Limbaugh has since denied making. As is our policy when a fact in a blog post is called into question, we gave its author 24 hours to substantiate the quote. Since he has not been able to do so, the quotes have been deleted from the post."

The president of the conservative media watchdog organization Media Research Center, Brent Bozell, called for CNN and MSNBC to prove Limbaugh said the offending statement, or retract and apologize for repeating it. On October 16, 2009, both CNN and MSNBC issued statements regarding their restating the quotes attributed to Limbaugh. "We should not have reported it – not have reported it – without independent confirmation, and for that I apologize," said CNN's Rick Sanchez. "MSNBC attributed that quote to a football player who was opposed to Limbaugh's NFL bid. However, we have been unable to verify that quote independently. So, just to clarify," said David Shuster in a clarification on MSNBC. Fox News Channel reported on October 17, 2009 that multiple legal analysts stated Limbaugh could file a libel lawsuit in order to prove he did not say the words attributed to him.
