= The Bounding Billow =

Sailor-written newspaper

- Front page of the June 1898 issue, published in Manila, Philippines.
- Founder: Louis Stanley Young
- Founded: November 1897
- Ceased publication: Late 1898
- Headquarters: USS Olympia

The Bounding Billow was a sailor-written newspaper published aboard the USS Olympia from 1897 to 1898. Although it has received little scholarly attention, the newspaper documented key historical events in the Spanish–American War (April 25, 1898 – August 12, 1898), as well as cultural aspects of life in the U.S. Navy

== Overview ==
The Bounding Billow was a small-circulation newspaper edited by, and aimed at, American sailors aboard the USS Olympia, a Navy warship stationed in the Pacific during the Spanish–American War. Apprentice Seaman Louis Stanley Young (1877-1949), a former printer, created and edited the paper aboard the warship from November 1897 to the end of 1898. The paper ran for seven issues, produced at irregular intervals in one of the torpedo rooms aboard the ship while the soldiers were stationed in locations in the Pacific, including Nagasaki, Yokohama, Hong Kong, and Manila.

== Content ==
The Bounding Billow mostly published short articles about the day-to-day lives of the sailors aboard the USS Olympia. The paper included reviews of shows presented by the men aboard the ship, the results of sporting events, travel diaries, gossip, pictures from the ship, and humorous content about the men aboard. Sample titles include “Contortive Cognomens”, “Doings in Society”, and “Hot Shot.” The paper also included humorous advertisements about the limited services available aboard the ship as well as a restaurant located ashore in Nagasaki. The paper was fully written and published by sailors aboard the ship. The paper also contained news coverage of key events in the Spanish–American War, including the Sinking of the USS Maine and a first-hand account of the Battle of Manila Bay, in which the Olympia was the flagship.

== Journalistic authority ==
Although yellow journalism, a type of sensational reporting that had little concern with facts, was common in large American papers during the Spanish–American War, soldier papers provided eyewitness accounts from the front. James Berkley argues that through its coverage of the Battle of Manila, the Bounding Billow “became a space for navigating the choppy waters of journalistic and representational authority.” The eyewitness accounts in the paper tried to report facts as objectively and accurately as possible. In the June 1898 issue, editor Young corrected another soldier newspaper’s coverage of the battle. In that issue, Young condemned the Searchlight for focusing too much on its own involvement in the battle, to the detriment of the rest of the ships involved. Young’s criticism read: “we deem it our duty to give our young friend a little fatherly advice—Always be impartial in all your writings, give credit where credit is due, treat matters in a purely literary light, never allow yourself to be swayed by the desire to please only your own immediate neighbors, but take for your motto ‘Pro bono Publico’” That same June 1898 issue of the Bounding Billow commended a Spanish paper, Diaro de Manila, for its fair coverage of the Battle of Manila. The paper's coverage of the battle was slightly delayed due to a shortage of paper aboard the ship. 'The Billow was printed once the paper was ‘captured’ from Spanish ships.

== Soldier newspapers during the Spanish–American War ==
Other soldier newspapers published during the Spanish–American War include The Searchlight, which was published aboard the USS Baltimore, the Co. F Enterprise, The American Soldier, The Manila Outpost, The New Orient (Uncle Sam), and The Soldier’s Letter.

== Importance of soldier newspapers ==
Soldier newspapers published before World War I have received little scholarly attention, yet they bear great historical significance. Soldier papers not only documented the everyday cultural aspects of life in the military at various points in history; they also served to “create a sense of belonging and community for the soldiers.” Soldier papers, while aimed primarily at military men, often made their way back home, linking the men abroad and the people within U.S. borders, creating an “imagined community of empire.” The Bounding Billow was sent back to America and was referenced in several domestic papers, including the St. Louis Herald and the New York Times. Berkley argues that since the paper’s audience includes the ‘folks at home,’ the paper is serving to spread the domestic boundaries of America beyond its shores. Berkley argues that the Bounding Billow shows “soldiers’ growing consciousness of the role of newspapers in mediating and imagining their community.” In The Anarchy of Empire in the Making of U.S. Culture, Amy Kaplan notes that the Spanish–American War was preceded by rapid U.S. expansion and imperialism under the Doctrine of Manifest destiny. Kaplan argues that a period of “Manifest Domesticity” followed the rapid U.S. expansion after the Spanish–American War, including the acquisition of many Spanish territories, including Puerto Rico and the Philippines, saying “the notions of the domestic and the foreign mutually constitute one another in an imperial context.” Kaplan goes on to say “’Manifest Domesticity’ turns an imperial nation into a home by producing and colonizing specters of the foreign that lurk inside and outside ever-shifting borders.” The Bounding Billow played a key role in the imperialist discourse related to the Spanish–American War. The paper itself published maps showing American expansion by “rearrang[ing] global relationships through the agency of print.” The Bounding Billow also wrote letters to and received letters from a number of other papers, both foreign and domestic, including an American high school paper, the Butte High School Leader, and the Hong Kong Telegraph. Berkley cites this variety of relationships as indicative of shifting imperial and national identities.

== Final issue ==
The final issue of the Bounding Billow was published in November–December 1898. At that time, the ship was nearing the end of its duties, and the men aboard were becoming increasingly “restless.” In January 1899, the ship was transferred to ‘command-and-control’ duty, until it set sail to leave the Pacific in May of that year. By the end of 1898, Young, the editor of the paper, began to take on other interests, such as publishing his own book about his experience in the war. No further issues of the paper were published.
