= What Liberal Media? =

2003 book by Eric Alterman

What Liberal Media?: The Truth About Bias and the News
- Author: Eric Alterman
- Subject: Media bias
- Publisher: Basic Books
- Publication date: 2003
- Pages: 322
- ISBN: 978-0-465-00177-4

What Liberal Media?: The Truth About Bias and the News is a book by columnist Eric Alterman that challenges the widespread conservative belief in a liberal media bias. Alterman argues that the media, as a whole, is not biased liberally, but conservatively.

== Critical response ==
The Los Angeles Times called the book, "A well-documented, even-tempered and witty answer, I might say antidote, to such toxic recent bestsellers as Bernard Goldberg's 'Bias.'"

Ted Widmer of the New York Times Book Review said "'What Liberal Media' is bold, counterintuitive and cathartic".

The New Yorker said of the book, "A polemic is nothing without passion, and Alterman's argumentative vigor is engaging [and]... the meticulous care with which his arguments are sourced and footnoted is in commendable contrast to the efforts of some of his more fire-breathing opponents."
