= Jeff Danziger =

American political cartoonist and author (b. 1943)

- Born: 1943 (age 82–83) New York City, U.S.
- Area: Cartoonist
- Notable works: editorial cartoons McGonigle of the Chronicle

Jeff Danziger (born 1943) is an American syndicated political cartoonist and author.

== Biography ==
Danziger's father is Jewish. He served in the United States Army from 1967 until 1971. An intelligence officer and linguist during the Vietnam War, Danziger was awarded the Bronze Star and Air Medal in 1970. In 1971, he began teaching English at Union 32 High School in East Montpelier, Vermont, where he taught specialized classes in journalism and expository writing at an advanced level.

Danziger wrote a factual but comical autobiography of his years serving in the army during the war. Lieutenant Dangerous was published by Steerforth Press in 2021. Tim O'Brien, author of The Things They Carried, characterized the book as "funny, biting, thoughtful, and wholly original".

== Work ==
=== 1980s and 1990s ===
Danziger worked for the Christian Science Monitor between 1987 and 1997.

He created the comic strip McGonigle of the Chronicle (distributed by the Field Newspaper Syndicate), which ran from 1983 to 1985 in newspapers across the country, and a weekly series, The Teeds: Tales of Agriculture for the Young and Old that continues to run in Vermont newspapers. He also created the short-lived syndicated comic strip Stitches, about a doctor's office, that was syndicated by the Washington Post Writers Group from 1997 to 1998.

=== 2000s ===
Danziger lampooned the George W. Bush administration in many of his cartoons, some of which are collected in the anthologies Wreckage Begins with 'W' and Blood, Debt and Fears. In an interview with The Comics Journal, Danziger said, "Keep in mind that I agree with a great many things that the Republicans have been traditionally for. I am in favor of a solid economy. I am in favor of a strong dollar. I am in favor of looking after troops. I am in favor of maintaining a strong army, and I am in favor of the ability to go into business and make a profit and not pay taxes for silly purposes."

In 2005, when Condoleezza Rice was nominated to be U.S. Secretary of State, Danziger drew a cartoon that was critical of Rice where he used racial stereotypes concerning the speech and appearance of African Americans. Danziger was criticized by the National Black Republican Association who stated that Danziger "depicted Dr. Rice as an ignorant, barefoot "mammy," reminiscent of the stereotyped black woman in the movie Gone with the Wind who remarked: "I don't know nothin' 'bout birthin' no babies.'"

In October 2005, Danziger published a cartoon in the Rutland Herald depicting a scientist unearthing a roulette wheel at an Abenaki archaeological site. Examining the artwork carefully, one finds in very small print "Sweat Lodge Casino." The portrayal of Indians as casino operators outraged Native Americans across the country and highlighted a larger part of Indian portrayal in the media. The Barre Montpelier Times Argus wrote: "Publishers of newspapers think it's okay to mock and offend Indians; they say, 'How could this possibly be racist, we're only kidding.' The institution of media is in denial about promoting racism. In fact, they don't even notice."

Danziger was listed in conservative political commentator Bernard Goldberg's 2005 book, 100 People Who Are Screwing Up America. Danziger described the listing as "an honor." He was previously published by the Los Angeles Times Syndicate starting in 2009.

=== 2020s ===
Danziger has drawn many cartoons critical of the war in the Gaza Strip and Israel that started in 2023. Tony Doris, editorial editor of The Palm Beach Post, was fired by newspaper owner Gannett Newspapers in 2025 after he chose a cartoon by Danziger that showed two Israeli soldiers rescuing a hostage who had been captured by Hamas, with one saying, "Watch your step", as they walk through a mass of bodies labeled "Over 40,000 Palestinians killed." The firing followed criticism of the cartoon from a local Jewish organization, which bought a full-page ad in the paper condemning the cartoon and whose president later said trivialized the suffering of Israeli hostages taken during the October 7 attacks war's beginning.
