= Republicans pounce =

Alleged phenomenon of media bias

The phrase "Republicans pounce" (or related phrases, such as "conservatives pounce" or "seize") is a term used by some conservative commentators in the United States to illustrate media bias against Republicans and conservatives. These commentators have argued that journalists downplay controversies and potentially negative stories about Democrats, liberals, and progressives by emphasizing the Republican or conservative response, rather than the negative aspects of the stories themselves.

Analyses of U.S. news stories have shown that the "pounces" phrasing is used with roughly equal frequency to refer to Republicans and Democrats, while acknowledging the difficulty of measuring the phenomenon qualitatively.

== Analysis ==
According to an analysis by Washington Post reporter Aaron Blake, the use of the "pounce" framing "appears to be pretty bipartisan in its implementation." Searching U.S. newspapers and wire services between 2010 and 2019, Blake found 1,732 instances of Democrats or liberals "pouncing," versus 1,427 instances of Republicans or conservatives doing the same. However, he cautioned that this approach had several limitations: it did not survey cable news; it did not include similar verbs such as "seize on"; and it did not assess the severity of the controversy being "pounced" upon.

Wall Street Journal editor James Freeman describes the term as a "long-running joke among right-leaning media skeptics", but found little evidence to back it up. In a 2019 search of the Factiva news archive, he discovered 311 occurrences of the phrasing "Democrats pounce," compared with 245 occurrences of "Republicans pounce." While this suggested that the framing has been applied more toward Democrats, Freeman acknowledged that the phenomenon was "difficult to measure qualitatively."

Blake identifies a 1933 New York Times article "Revived Republicans Pounce on Democrats" as one of the first occurrences of this phrasing in print, but says that the overwhelming majority of "Republicans pounce" headlines in the Times or The Washington Post have been printed in the 21st century.

== Commentary ==
After Harvard University president Claudine Gay resigned in the wake of plagiarism allegations, the Associated Press' headline called plagiarism a "new conservative weapon against colleges". Conservatives criticized the AP's coverage as a case of media bias. Washington Examiner editor Quin Hillyer called the AP's story a "perfect example" of the "Republicans pounce" phenomenon.

The National Post has associated the phenomenon, along with other instances of "unconscious bias" among journalists, with the decline of public trust in the mainstream news media.

James Freeman discussed the construction in the context of the 2019 New York Times article "Ocasio-Cortez Team Flubs a Green New Deal Summary, and Republicans Pounce". Commentary writer Noah Rothman argues that the "Republicans pounce" construction benefits Democrats, using the 2015 story "Republicans seize on Planned Parenthood video" in The Hill as an example. Washington Examiner editor Nicholas Clairmont says that the use of the "Republicans pounce" trope is a form of "othering" by journalists, although not necessarily deliberate or inaccurate.

National Review political correspondent Jim Geraghty has criticized "Republicans pounce" headlines for contributing to political polarization, saying that such headlines give the public a "psychological permission slip" to ignore legitimate issues or scandals based on who is criticizing them. Another National Review writer, Charles C. W. Cooke, linked "Republicans pounce" to media coverage suggesting that Republican politicians are engaging in "culture wars."

Mother Jones writer Kevin Drum said that the claims Republicans made about the term were difficult to prove. He observed that only limited conclusions can be drawn from simple keyword searches, writing: "What we really need to know is whether Republicans suffer more than Democrats from a general framing that focuses on the opposition response instead of the initial miscue."
