= Kevin Mattson =

American historian and critic (born 1966)

- Born: December 25, 1966 (age 59); Cheverly, Maryland, US
- Political party: Democratic

Academic background
- Education: New School for Social Research; University of Rochester
- Thesis: Creating a Democratic Public (1994)
- Doctoral advisor: Christopher Lasch

Academic work
- Discipline: History
- Sub-discipline: American history
- Institutions: Rochester Institute of Technology; Rutgers University; Ohio University

Kevin Mattson (born 1966) is an American historian and critic. Mattson received his BA from the New School for Social Research and his PhD from the University of Rochester. For several years he ran the Walt Whitman Center for the Culture and Politics of Democracy at Rutgers University.

He is the Connor Study Professor of Contemporary History at Ohio University. He is a fellow at the Center for American Progress and on the editorial board of Dissent.

He has received College of Arts & Sciences award for the Outstanding Faculty Research and Scholarship in the Social Sciences 2013–2014.

== Works ==
- Creating a Democratic Public: The Struggle for Urban Participatory Democracy During the Progressive Era (diss., 1998)
- Intellectuals in Action: The Origins of the New Left and Radical Liberalism, 1945-1970 (2002)
- Engaging Youth: Combating the Apathy of Young Americans Toward Politics (2003)
- Upton Sinclair and the Other American Century (2006)
- When America Was Great: The Fighting Faith of Liberalism in Post-War America (2004, 2nd ed. 2006)
- Rebels All! A Short History of the Conservative Mind in Postwar America (2008)
- What the Heck Are You Up To Mr. President? Jimmy Carter, America's Malaise and the Speech That Should Have Changed the Country (2009)
- Just Plain Dick: Richard Nixon's Checkers Speech and the 'Rocking, Socking' Election of 1952 (2012)
- We're Not Here to Entertain: Punk Rock, Ronald Reagan, and the Real Culture War of 1980s America (2020)

Edited books

- Steal This University: The Rise of the Corporate University and the Academic Labor Movement, ed. with Benjamin Johnson and Patrick Kavanagh (2003)
- Liberalism for a New Century , ed. with Neil Jumonville (2007)
- Democracy's Moment : Reforming the American Political System for the 21st Century ed. with Ronald Hayduk (2002)
- The Cause: The Fight for American Liberalism from Franklin Roosevelt to Barack Obama with Eric Alterman (2012)

Other writings

- Mattson's articles in The American Prospect
- Mattson's articles in Dissent
- Mattson's articles in Democracy Journal
