= Eric Alterman =

American historian (born 1960)

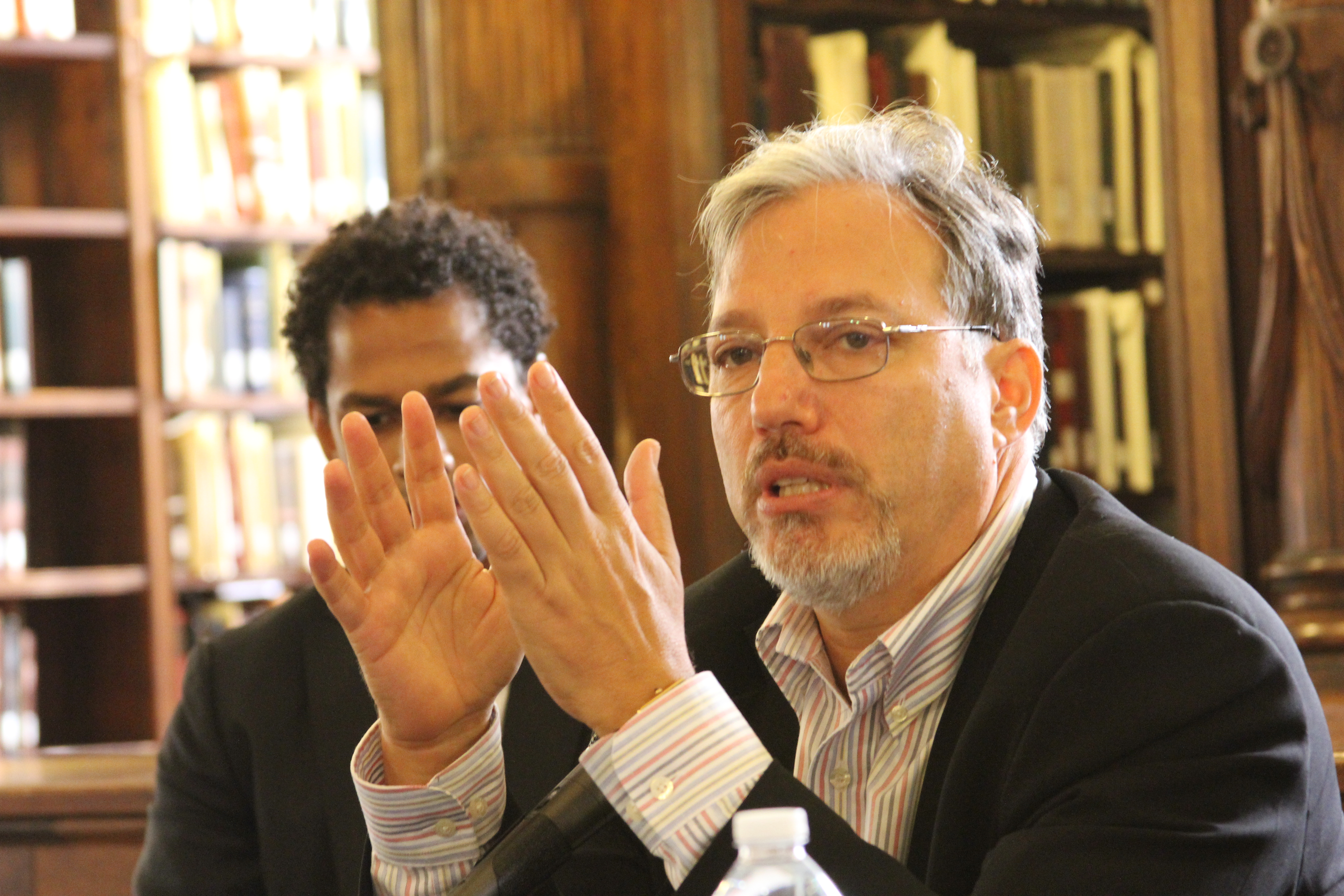
- Alterman in 2012
- Born: January 14, 1960 (age 66)
- Education: Cornell University (BA); Yale University (MA); Stanford University (PhD)
- Occupations: Journalist; author; professor
- Children: 1

Eric Alterman (born January 14, 1960) is an American historian and journalist. He is a CUNY Distinguished Professor of English and Journalism at Brooklyn College and the author of twelve books.

From 1995 to 2020, Alterman was "The Liberal Media" columnist for The Nation. He is a contributing writer there, and at The American Prospect, where under a two-year grant he wrote the newsletter, Altercation, until January 27, 2023. In his farewell newsletter column Alterman stated that he opened a Substack page, also entitled Altercation, on January 21, 2023, and that although publication plans were only in development, he was accepting free subscriptions.

== Early life and education ==
Alterman was born to a Jewish family in 1960. He graduated from Scarsdale High School in the New York suburb.

He earned a BA in history and government from Cornell University, an MA in international relations from Yale University, and a PhD in U.S. history from Stanford University. His doctoral dissertation, completed in 2002 with Barton Bernstein as primary advisor, was entitled, Two lies: the consequences of presidential deception.

== Career ==
=== Journalism ===
Alterman began his journalism career in 1983, freelancing originally for The Nation, The Washington Monthly, The New Republic, Harper's, Le Monde diplomatique, and later, for Vanity Fair, The New York Times Magazine, The New Yorker, and The Atlantic Monthly, among others, while working as a senior fellow for the World Policy Institute in New York City and Washington, D.C. Not long after, he became the Washington correspondent for Mother Jones and, soon thereafter, Rolling Stone, before returning to The Nation as a columnist in 1995.

Alterman has been a contributing editor or columnist for many publications including Elle, Worth, Rolling Stone, and The Sunday Express (London), while he has also contributed to The New Yorker, The Atlantic, and Le Monde Diplomatique. In 2021, he restarted "Altercation" as a newsletter published by The American Prospect. It previously had been a daily blog featured by MSNBC beginning in 2002.

=== Television ===
Alterman was hired by MSNBC in 1996, appearing as a commentator on the cable channel and writing a column posted on its website. In 2002, MSNBC engaged him to create the blog daily "Altercation", one of the first blogs hosted by a mainstream media news organization. In September 2006, after a ten-year association, Alterman and MSNBC parted ways. Media Matters for America hired him as a senior fellow and agreed to host "Altercation", effective from September 18, 2006. Regular contributors to "Altercation" included the sportswriter Charlie Pierce and the historian and military officer Robert Bateman. On December 22, 2008, Alterman announced that "Altercation" would be moving to the website for The Nation in 2009, and would appear on a less regular basis than its previous Monday to Friday schedule. He also has worked as a history consultant for HBO Films.

=== Teaching career ===
Alterman has taught journalism at both New York University and Columbia University. Since fall 2004, he has been a professor of English at Brooklyn College, where he teaches courses in media and media history. In 2007, he was named a CUNY distinguished professor of English at Brooklyn College and professor of journalism at the CUNY Graduate School of Journalism.

=== Books ===
Alterman's first book was entitled, Sound & Fury: The Making of the Punditocracy, which won the 1992 George Orwell Award. Alterman wrote the book while studying for his doctorate in U.S. history at Stanford University. Alterman's other books include the national best-sellers, What Liberal Media? The Truth About Bias and the News (2003, 2004) and The Book on Bush: How George W. (Mis)leads America (2004). Other books he has authored include Who Speaks for America? Why Democracy Matters in Foreign Policy (1998) and the second edition of Sound & Fury (2000). His It Ain't No Sin to be Glad You're Alive: The Promise of Bruce Springsteen (1999, 2001) won the 1999 Stephen Crane Literary Award. In September 2004, Viking Press published When Presidents Lie: A History of Official Deception and its Consequences – a version of his doctoral dissertation – on lies of major consequence told by American presidents.

His seventh book, published in 2008 by Viking was entitled, Why We're Liberals: A Political Handbook for Post-Bush America. Also in 2008, Alterman published a lengthy essay in The New Yorker on the decline of American newspapers and the future role of new media news sites. His eighth book, Kabuki Democracy: The System vs. Barack Obama, was published in early 2011. It was an extension of a lengthy article by him that was published by The Nation in summer 2010. Alterman's ninth book, The Cause: The Fight for American Liberalism from Franklin Roosevelt to Barack Obama (2012), is a history of postwar American liberalism co-authored with the historian Kevin Mattson. Three years later, in 2015, his tenth book, Inequality in One City: Bill de Blasio and the New York Experiment was published.

In 2020, he published his eleventh book, Lying in State: Why Presidents Lie and Why Trump is Worse.

His twelfth book was published in 2022 and is entitled We Are Not One: A History of America’s Fight Over Israel.

=== Media criticism ===
Alterman's media criticism was the subject of two of his books. In contrast to conservative media commentators, Alterman argues that the press is biased against liberals rather than biased in their favor. He was called "the most honest and incisive media critic writing today" in the National Catholic Reporter and the author of "the smartest and funniest political journal out there" in the San Francisco Chronicle. In 2008, Alterman became a regular columnist for the Jewish magazine, Moment, where he wrote regularly about Jewish issues. From 2009 to 2012, he was a regular contributor to The Daily Beast.

== Quotes by and about ==
Alterman was and remains a critic of Ralph Nader for Nader's actions in the 2000 U.S. presidential election, arguing that Nader is to blame for the election of George W. Bush because of vote splitting. He has called Nader "Bush's Useful Idiot", myopic, and a deluded megalomaniac. In the documentary, An Unreasonable Man, he is quoted as saying about Nader: "The man needs to go away. I think he needs to live in a different country. He's done enough damage to this one. Let him damage somebody else's now."

Alterman has criticized Steve Jobs for his avarice and for failing to give any of his wealth to the poor. Jobs died with more than $8 billion in various bank accounts and with shareholdings in a tax-free fund with assets of more than $70 billion. He has also accused Apple of business practices that ultimately result in the misery of Chinese workers. Alterman appears in the award-winning documentary film on Lee Atwater, Boogie Man: The Lee Atwater Story. In it, Alterman says, "Race is poison, but it is poison that works for their side. People vote their fears and not their hopes, and Lee understood that." He also appears in Robert Greenwald's documentary, Outfoxed, and in Best of Enemies, a documentary about Gore Vidal and William F. Buckley.

His critics have called Alterman a member of the Israel lobby. Alterman claims that his views on Israel are attacked by both the left for being too pro-Israel and by the right, such as The Weekly Standard, for not supporting Israel enough.

== Major works ==
- Sound & Fury: The Making of the Punditocracy (1992, 1993, 2000) ISBN 978-0-8014-8639-5
- Who Speaks for America? Why Democracy Matters in Foreign Policy, (1998) ISBN 978-0-8014-3574-4
- It Ain't No Sin to be Glad You're Alive: The Promise of Bruce Springsteen (1999, 2001)
- What Liberal Media? The Truth About Bias and the News (2003, 2004) ISBN 978-0-465-00177-4
- The Book on Bush: How George W. (Mis)leads America (2004) ISBN 0-14-303442-1
- When Presidents Lie: A History of Official Deception and its Consequences, (2004, 2005) ISBN 978-0-670-03209-9
- Why We're Liberals: A Handbook for Restoring America's Most Important Ideals (2008, 2009) ISBN 978-0-14-311522-9
- Kabuki Democracy: The System vs. Barack Obama (2011) ISBN 978-1-56858-659-5
- The Cause: The Fight for American Liberalism from Franklin Roosevelt to Barack Obama with Kevin Mattson (2012) ISBN 978-0-67-002343-1
- Inequality and One City: Bill de Blasio and the New York Experiment, Year One (2015) ISBN 978-1-940489-19-3
- Lying in State: Why Presidents Lie - And Why Trump Is Worse (2020) ISBN 978-1-541616-82-0
- We Are Not One: A History of America's Fight Over Israel (2022) ISBN 978-0465096312

== Honors and awards ==
During the course of his career, Alterman has been recognized for the following honors and awards:

- Winner, 1993 George Orwell Award for Distinguished Contribution to Honesty and Clarity in Public Language for Sound & Fury: The Making of the Punditocracy
- Winner, Stephen Crane Literary Award for It Ain't No Sin to be Glad You're Alive, 1999
- Finalist, Mirror Awards for "Best Single Article, Traditional" and "Best Commentary, Digital", 2009
- Finalist, Mirror Award for "Best Commentary, Digital", 2010
- Winner, Mirror Award for "Best Commentary, Digital" and Finalist, "Best Commentary, Traditional", 2011
- Finalist, Mirror Award for "Best Commentary, Traditional", 2012
- Media Fellow, Hoover Institute, Stanford University, Stanford, California, June 2013
- Finalist, Mirror Award for "Best Commentary, Digital" and "Best Commentary, Traditional", 2013
- Finalist, Mirror Award for "Best Commentary, Traditional" 2014
- Finalist, Mirror Award for "Best Commentary", 2016
- Selected, Schusterman Fellow, Brandeis University, 2016
- Elected to be Fellow of the Society of American Historians, 2016
- Winner, Mirror Award for "Best Commentary", 2017
