= Bias: A CBS Insider Exposes How the Media Distort the News =

Book by Bernard Goldberg

Bias
- Author: Bernard Goldberg
- Publisher: Regnery Publishing
- Publication date: February 25, 2001
- Media type: Hardcover
- Pages: 250 pages
- ISBN: 0-89526-190-1

Bias: A CBS Insider Exposes How the Media Distort the News is a non-fiction book by Bernard Goldberg, a 28-year veteran CBS news reporter and producer, giving detailed examples of liberal bias in television news reporting. It was published in 2001 by Regnery Publishing and reached number 1 on The New York Times Best Seller list in the non-fiction category.

== See also ==
- 100 People Who Are Screwing Up America.
