= Jeremy Jaynes =

American businessman and spammer

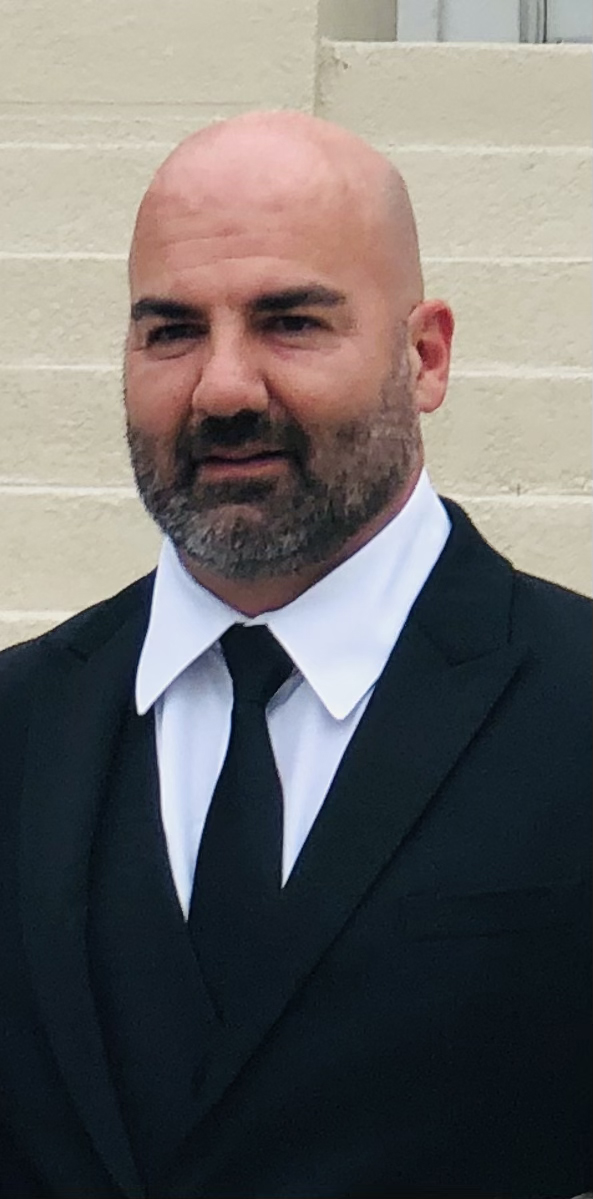
Jeremy Jaynes

Jeremy Jaynes (born 1974) is an American entrepreneur and business consultant. Jaynes is best known for some of his earliest online ventures in 2004, that involved the act of e-mail spamming, broadcasting junk e-mail from his home in North Carolina, United States. Jaynes and his business partner, his sister Jessica DeGroot, were the first people in the world to be charged with "felony spam", i.e., sending spam without allegation of any accompanying illegal conduct such as theft, fraud, trespass, defamation, or obscenity.

Jaynes' acquittal was granted by the Virginia Supreme Court ruling unanimously the law Jaynes was prosecuted under violated the First Amendment. On March 30, 2009, the Supreme Court of the United States refused the Virginia Attorney General's petition for a writ of certiorari to review the decision of the Supreme Court of Virginia overturning the anti-spam statute. Jaynes never served any of his prison sentence for the overturned conviction. DeGroot was ordered to pay a fine of US$7,500.

== Personal life ==
Jeremy Jaynes attended high school in Baton Rouge, Louisiana. His father was a professor of genetic engineering at Louisiana State University. He currently lives and works just outside of Raleigh, North Carolina. He is married with 3 children.

== See also ==
- List of spammers
