= American propaganda of the Spanish–American War =

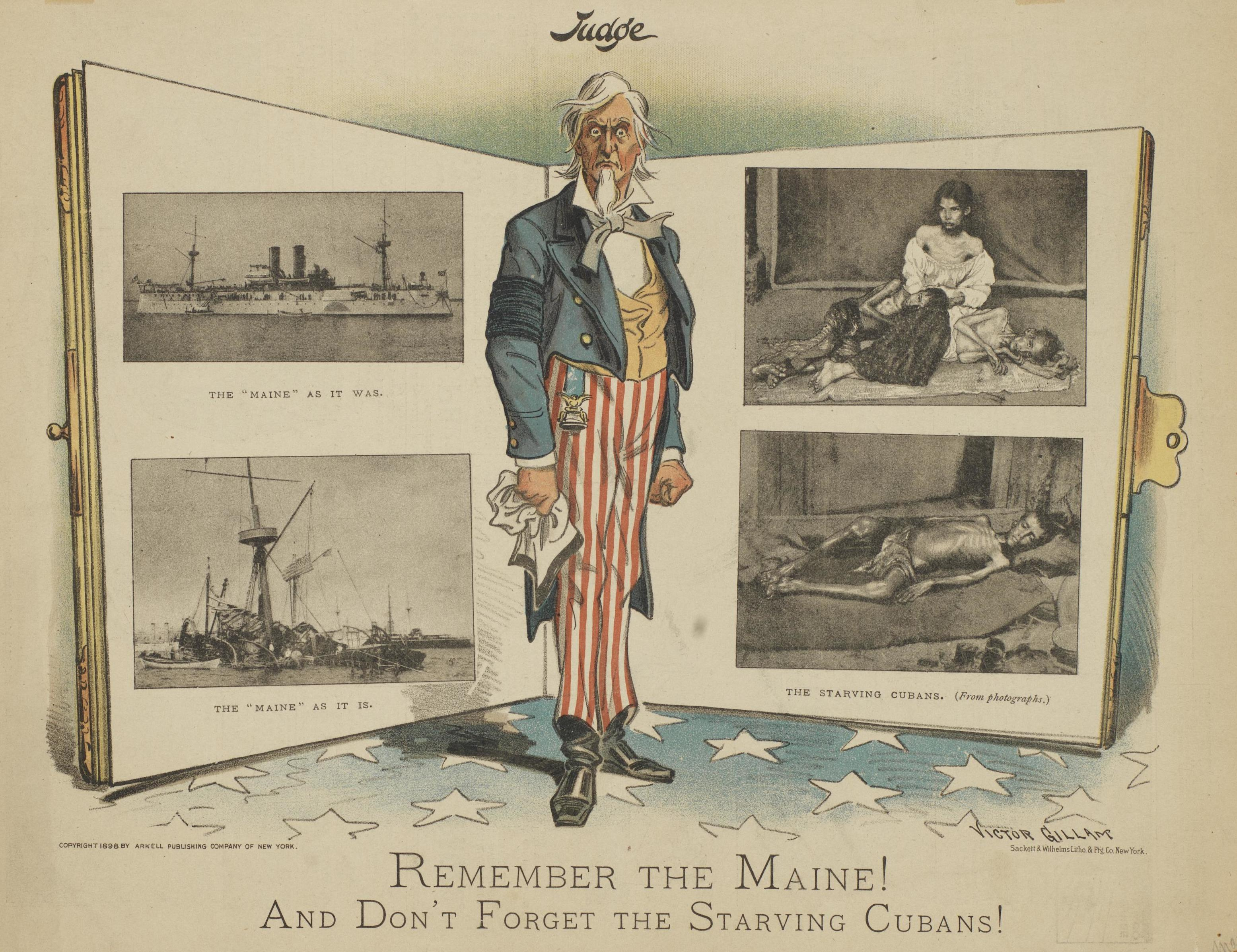
American cartoon, published in 1898: "Remember the Maine! And Don't Forget the Starving Cubans!"

The Spanish–American War (April–August 1898) is considered to be both a turning point in the history of propaganda and the beginning of the practice of yellow journalism. It was the first conflict in which military action was precipitated by media involvement. The war grew out of U.S. interest in a fight for revolution between the Spanish military and citizens of their Cuban colony. American newspapers fanned the flames of interest in the war by fabricating atrocities which justified intervention in a number of Spanish colonies worldwide.

Several forces within the United States were pushing for a war with Spain. Their tactics were wide-ranging and their goal was to engage the opinion of the American people in any way possible. Men such as William Randolph Hearst, the owner of the New York Journal was involved in a circulation war with Joseph Pulitzer of the New York World and saw the conflict as a way to sell papers. Many newspapers ran articles of a sensationalist nature and sent correspondents to Cuba to cover the war. Correspondents had to evade Spanish authorities; usually they were unable to get reliable news and relied heavily on informants for their stories.

Many stories were derived from second or third hand accounts and were either elaborated, misrepresented or completely fabricated by journalists to enhance their dramatic effect. Theodore Roosevelt, who was the Assistant Secretary of the Navy at this time, wanted to use the conflict both to help heal the wounds still fresh from the American Civil War, and to increase the strength of the US Navy, while simultaneously establishing the United States as a presence on the world stage. Roosevelt put pressure on the United States Congress to come to the aid of the Cuban people. He emphasized Cuban weakness and femininity to justify the US's military intervention.

== Background ==
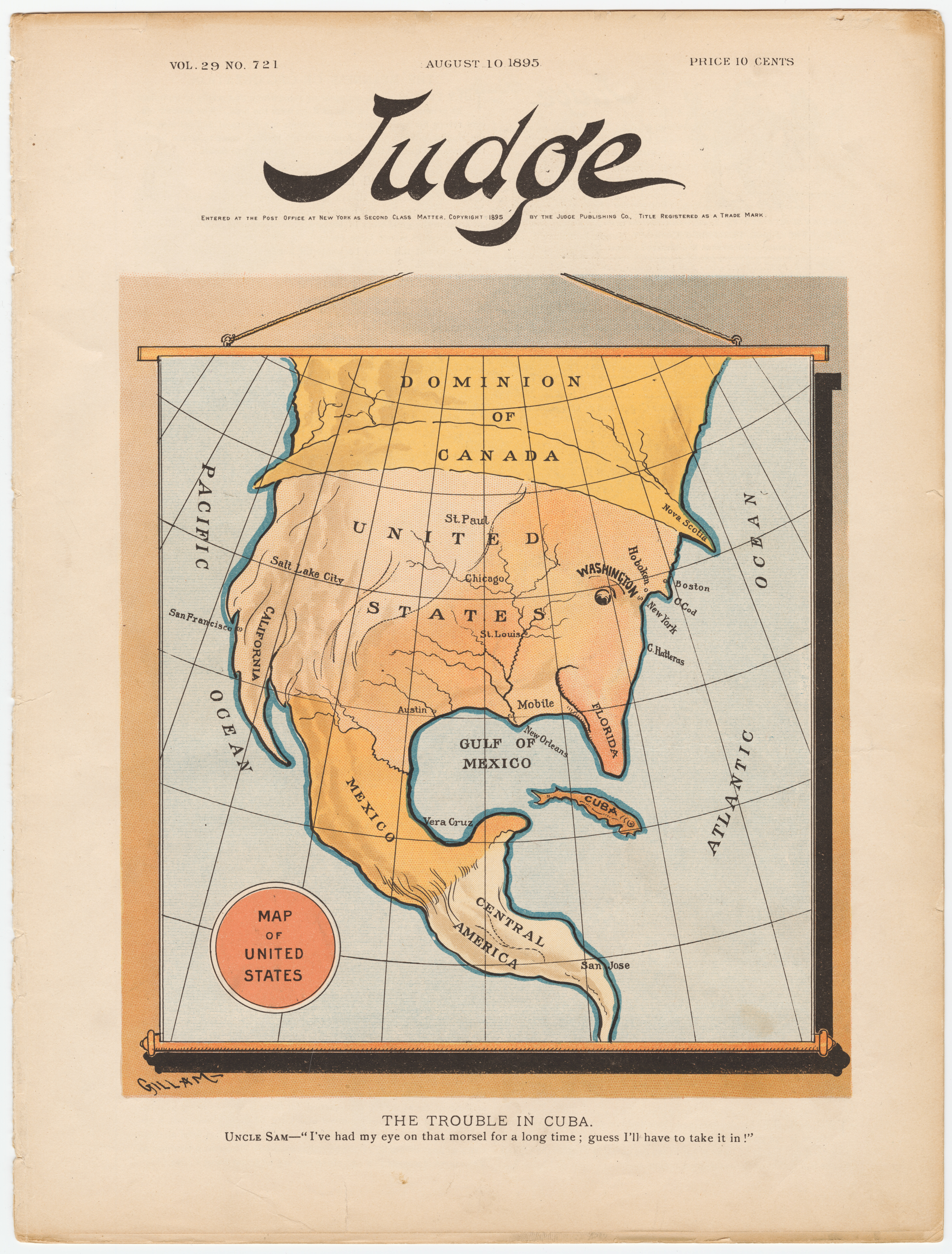
A satirical map, titled "The trouble of Cuba" (1895) by Bernhard Gillam, reflecting the American sentiment towards Cuba, three years before the beginning of the Spanish–American War

The United States had long been interested in acquiring Cuba from the declining Spanish Empire. Prompted by John L. O'Sullivan, President James Polk offered to buy Cuba from Spain for $100 million in 1848, but Spain declined to sell the island. O'Sullivan continued to raise money for filibustering expeditions on his own, eventually landing him in legal trouble.

Filibustering continued to be a major concern for presidents after Polk. Whigs presidents Zachary Taylor and Millard Fillmore tried to suppress the expeditions. When the Democrats recaptured the White House in 1852 with the election of Franklin Pierce, a filibustering effort by John A. Quitman to acquire Cuba received the tentative support of the president. Pierce backed off, however, and instead renewed the offer to buy the island, this time for $130 million. When the public learned of the Ostend Manifesto in 1854, which argued that the United States could seize Cuba by force if Spain refused to sell, this effectively killed the effort to acquire the island. The public now linked expansion with slavery; if Manifest Destiny had once enjoyed widespread popular approval, this was no longer true.

The outbreak of the American Civil War in 1860 put a temporary end to the expansionist attempts, but as the Civil War faded into history, the term Manifest destiny experienced a brief revival. In the 1892 U.S. presidential election, the Republican Party platform proclaimed: "We reaffirm our approval of the Monroe Doctrine and believe in the achievement of the manifest destiny of the Republic in its broadest sense." After the Republicans recaptured the White House in 1896 and for the next 16 years they held on to it, Manifest Destiny was cited to promote overseas expansion.

The situation prior to the Spanish–American War was particularly tense. Several members of the media, such as William Randolph Hearst, and of the military were calling for intervention by the United States to help the revolutionaries in Cuba. American opinion was overwhelmingly swayed and hostility towards Spain began to build. American newspapers ran stories of a sensationalist nature depicting atrocities, both fabricated and real, committed by the Spanish. These stories often reflected true stories such as thousands of Cubans had been displaced to the country side in concentration camps, as well as entirely fictional accounts of Spaniards feeding Cuban children to sharks. Many stories used depictions of gruesome murders, rapes, and slaughter. During this time there was a riot in Havana by those sympathetic to the Spanish. The printing presses of newspapers that had criticized the actions of the Spanish Army were destroyed.

== Propaganda and the media ==
Shooting Captured Insurgents", reenactment probably filmed in New Jersey. Edison films catalog description: A file of Spanish soldiers line up the Cubans against a blank wall and fire a volley. The flash of rifles and drifting smoke make a very striking picture. Duration: 0:22 at 34 frame/s.

Before the sinking of the USS Maine, one American media correspondent stationed in Cuba was quoted as saying that the American people were being greatly deceived by reporters sent to cover the revolution. According to him an overwhelming majority of the stories were obtained through third hand information often relayed by their Cuban interpreters and informants. These people were often sympathetic to the revolution and would distort the facts to shed a positive light on the revolution. Routinely small skirmishes would become large battles. Cuban oppression was depicted through inhumane treatment, torture, rape, and mass pillaging by the Spanish forces. These stories revealed heaps of dead men, women, and children left on the side of the road. Correspondents rarely bothered to confirm facts; they simply passed the stories on to their editors in the states, where they would be put into publication after further editing and misrepresentation. This type of journalism became known as yellow journalism. Yellow journalism swept the nation and its propaganda helped to precipitate military action by the United States. The United States sent troops to Cuba as well as several other Spanish colonies throughout the world.

=== Hearst and Pulitzer ===
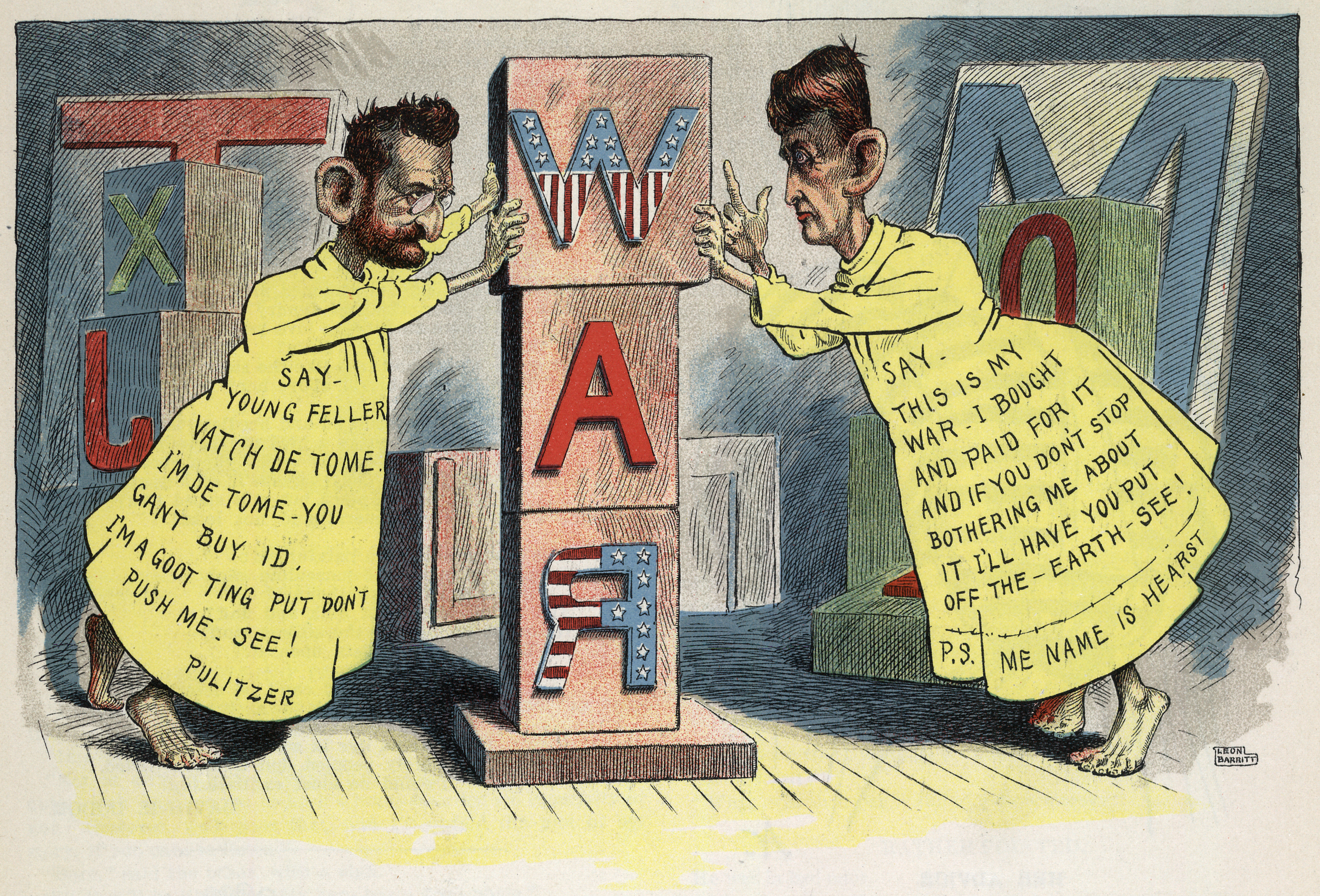
Joseph Pulitzer and William Randolph Hearst, full-length, dressed as the Yellow Kid, a satire of their role in drumming up USA public opinion to go to war with Spain

The two newspaper owners credited with developing the journalistic style of yellow journalism were William Randolph Hearst and Joseph Pulitzer. These two were fighting a circulation battle in New York City. Pulitzer owned the New York World, and Hearst the New York Journal. Through their disregard for responsible journalism, the two men are commonly credited with leading the USA into the Spanish–American War. Their stories swayed US public opinion to believe that the Cuban people were being unjustly persecuted by the Spanish, and that the only way for them to gain their independence was through American intervention. Hearst and Pulitzer made their stories credible by self-assertion and providing false names, dates, and locations of skirmishes and atrocities committed by the Spanish. Papers also claimed that their facts could be substantiated by the government.

While Hearst and Pulitzer's influence was significant among the upper classes and government officials, there were many Midwestern newspapers who denounced their use of sensational yellow journalism. Victor Lawson, owner of both the Chicago Record and Chicago Daily News, had garnered a large middle-class readership and was concerned with reporting only the facts surrounding the growing conflict between the United States and Spain. An office was set up by Lawson in nearby Key West in order to keep a close eye on the Cuban conflict. However, the focus of midwestern newspapers on particular facts served in the end as another cause of the war. Since the events occurring in Cuba were not always credible many midwestern newspaper owners shifted their content towards domestic issues, namely the effect of Cuba on the American economy. American interests in the trade with Cuba were significant, and through the papers' coverage of these matters, much of the readership in the midwest soon came to believe that protecting these interests was necessary for economic stability. The most obvious means of preserving these interests was through war with Spain.

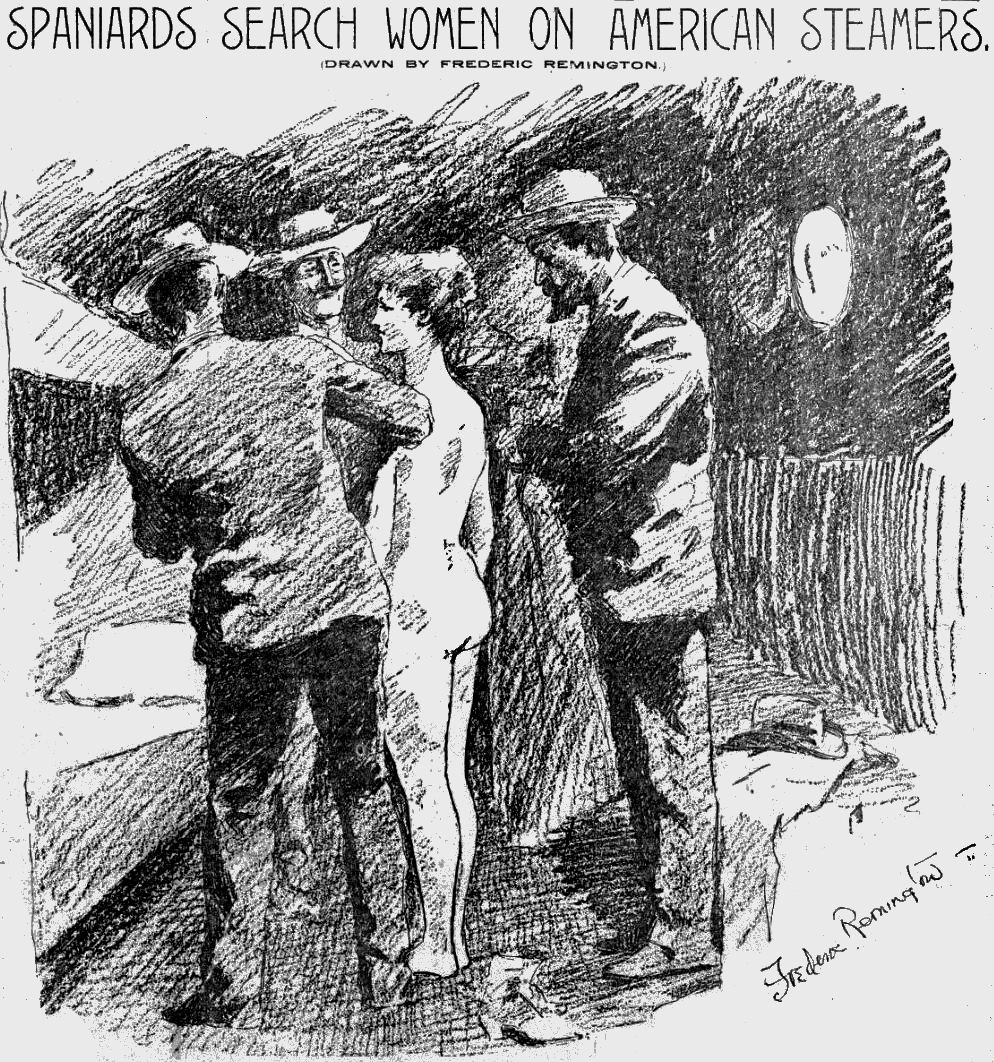
Frederic Remington illustration of a female American tourist being strip-searched by Spanish authorities for rebel messages

Concerned that their goals were being undermined by Lawson and other midwest newspapers, Hearst and Pulitzer were looking for any story which could expand their middle class audience. Two well-timed incidents served to support these interests. The first was the Olivette Incident, where a young and innocent-looking Cuban woman named Clemencia Arango was taken into custody aboard the New York bound ship Olivette by Spanish officials, under suspicion of delivering letters to rebel leaders stationed in the city. She was taken into a private room and searched. A passenger and reporter working for Hearst named Richard Harding Davis reported the incident, but was later appalled by the sensational claims which accused Spanish officials of sexual harassment. The headlines were as follows: "Does our flag shield women?", "Indignities Practiced by Spanish Officials On Board American Vessels" and "Refined Young Women Stripped and Searched by Brutal Spaniards While Under Our Flag on the Ollivette". Initially Hearst even succeeded in garnering support among American women, but he soon found himself in trouble when Arango clarified the accounts. Although he never published an apology, he was forced to print a letter in which he explained that his article had not meant to say that male policemen had searched the women and that, in fact, the search had been conducted quite properly by a police matron with no men present.

Fortunately for Hearst, a second incident soon followed. It involved a Cuban dentist named Ricardo Ruiz who had fled to the United States during the Cuban Ten Year War and had become a U.S. citizen. Ruiz voluntarily returned to Cuba after the conflict, married, and had children. He was soon imprisoned under suspicion of associating with rebels, and died in prison. Hearst published a headline the next day that read 'American Slain in Spanish Jail'. Ruiz' story had a significant impact on adding tension between the United States and Spain among the middle classes, who related to him even though Ruiz was a proud Cuban. Although these incidents fueled American animosity toward Spain, they were insufficient to directly cause a war. It would be the sensationalizing of the sinking of the USS Maine that would accomplish this task.

=== "When Johnny Comes Marching Home" in audio ===
When Johnny Comes Marching Home
A June 1898 recording of a United States patriotic song.

"When Johnny Comes Marching Home" was an adapted version of the popular United States military song, recorded during the Spanish–American War by Emile Berliner, inventor of the first lateral disc audio record, one year after he received the patent on the device.

The original version of the song, first published in 1863, expressed people's longing for the return of their dear ones fighting in the American Civil War.

=== The sinking of USS Maine ===
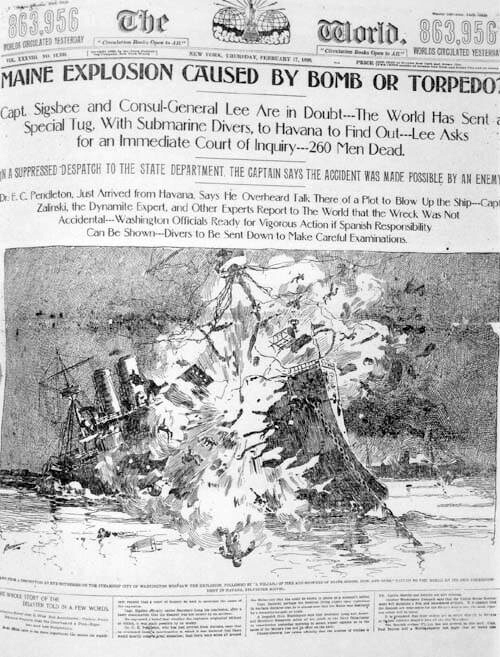
Artist's depiction of the destruction of the USS Maine in The World

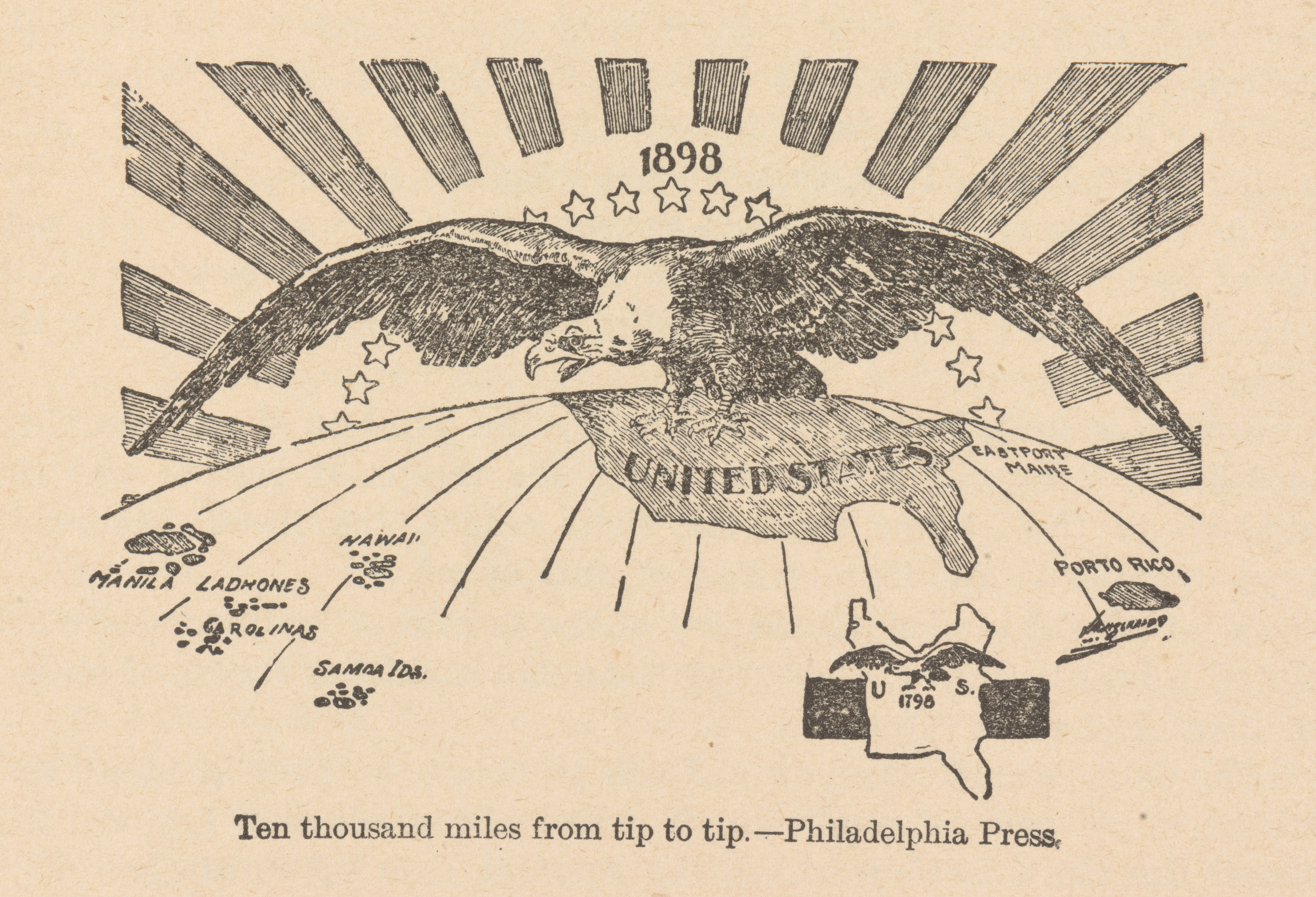
10000 Miles From Tip to Tip, 1898: The American Eagle spreading his wings from the Philippines to Puerto Rico, "Ten thousand miles from tip to tip." Inset is a much smaller eagle, presiding over the eastern U.S. 100 years earlier, in 1798.

Frederic Remington, an artist hired by Hearst to provide illustrations to accompany a series of articles on the Cuban Revolution, soon became bored with seemingly peaceful Cuba and wired Hearst in January 1897:

"Everything is quiet. There is no trouble. There will be no war. I wish to return." To which Hearst's alleged reply was: "Please remain. You furnish the pictures and I'll furnish the war."

In the days following the sinking of USS Maine, Hearst ran a story with the heading "The War Ship Maine was Split in Two by an Enemy's Secret Infernal Machine". The story told how the Spanish had planted a torpedo beneath USS Maine and detonated it from shore. Hearst soon followed this article with one containing diagrams and blueprints of the secret torpedoes used by Spain. Captain Sigsbee of USS Maine put in a telegram to the Secretary of the Navy that judgment and opinion should be suspended until further report. At the Court of Naval Inquiry, Sigsbee maintained a mine was responsible for sinking his ship. The Court found the same, but was unable to find evidence to attribute the sinking to "any person or persons."

An investigation in 1974, reached the opposite conclusion, that the explosion had originated inside the ship.

Many stories like the one published by Hearst were printed across the country blaming the Spanish military for the destruction of USS Maine. These stories struck a chord with the American people stirring public opinion up into a divided frenzy, with a large group of Americans wanting to attack and another wanting to wait for confirmation. The Americans that wanted to attack wanted to remove Spain from power in many of their colonies close to the U.S. Those easily persuaded by the Yellow Journalism eventually prevailed, and American troops were sent to Cuba.

== See also ==
- Black Legend
- Yellow journalism
- Propaganda Movement
