= Bernard Goldberg =

American journalist (born 1945)

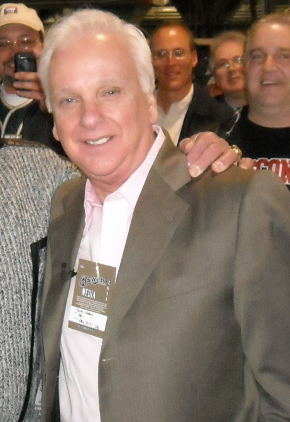
- Goldberg in 2011
- Born: Bernard Richard Goldberg; May 31, 1945 (age 81); New York City, New York U.S.
- Occupations: Journalist and author
- Years active: 1972−present
- Website: bernardgoldberg.com

Bernard Richard Goldberg (born May 31, 1945) is an American author, journalist, and political pundit. Goldberg has won fourteen Emmy Awards and was a producer, reporter and correspondent for CBS News for twenty-eight years (1972–2000) and a paid contributor for Fox News for ten years (2009–2018). He is best-known for his on-going critiques of journalism practices in the United States—as described in his first book published in 2001, Bias: A CBS Insider Exposes How the Media Distort the News. He was a correspondent for Real Sports with Bryant Gumbel on HBO for 22 years until January 2021.

== Personal background ==
Goldberg was born in New York City in 1945 and graduated from Rutgers University in 1967. Goldberg is of Jewish descent.

== Personal politics ==
Though frequently described as a conservative, Goldberg previously rejected the label, describing himself as a life-long liberal modeled after the 1960s ideals of the U.S. Democratic Party. In a February 22, 2012, interview, Goldberg said: "The reason (people claim I'm conservative) is so I'll be automatically marginalized. I wrote in 'Bias' that I would make racial discrimination a criminal offense, not just a civil offense. On gay rights, I don’t know anyone more Libertarian than me. I don’t want the government getting involved in it. I’m pro-abortion with reservations. I’ve never set foot in a country club in my life. I consider myself to be an old-fashioned liberal. I’m a liberal the way liberals used to be when they were like John F. Kennedy and when they were like Hubert Humphrey, when they were upbeat and enthusiastic and mainstream. I am not a liberal the way liberals are today, at least as exemplified by Al Franken and Michael Moore, where they’re angry, nasty, closed minded, and not mainstream, but fringe. I think this is what really irks the media (about me). That this is coming from one of them. I was one of them for 28 years."

Goldberg has since accepted the label of "conservative," saying in 2020, "I see myself as a conservative with live and let live principles… a conservative libertarian I guess. Now, even when I agree with liberals on this issue or that, I no longer want to be on their team. I not only don’t accept their new left wing politics, it’s also their holier than thou elitism that annoys me. I no longer see myself as a liberal. They left me, not the other way around. Now, I’m a conservative. Not a right-wing nut, just a conservative with libertarian tendencies."

Goldberg has been a frequent critic of President Barack Obama, President Donald Trump, and President Joe Biden.

== Career ==
From 1972 to 1974 he worked for CBS News as a producer in Atlanta; he became a reporter in 1974 and correspondent in 1976. Goldberg frequently contributed to the CBS Evening News and CBS newsmagazines Eye to Eye with Connie Chung and 48 Hours. For CBS, he hosted two primetime documentaries, Don't Blame Me and In Your Face, America. Don't Blame Me was broadcast on May 26, 1994, and explored alleged irresponsibility of Americans. In Your Face, America, which aired on April 7, 1998, said that American culture suffers from a "coarsening" instigated by entertainment such as The Jerry Springer Show, South Park, and gangsta rap music.

In 2001, his first book, Bias: A CBS Insider Exposes How the Media Distort the News, was published and became a number one New York Times bestseller.

Goldberg followed Bias with two books—Arrogance: Rescuing America from the Media Elite in 2003 and 100 People Who Are Screwing Up America in 2005. Boston Globe journalist Cathy Young—praised by Goldberg in 100 People—criticized the book for listing mostly liberal or liberal-leaning individuals and only "a Few Token Right-Wingers". There were also many favorable comments about the book including one from Jonah Goldberg (no relation) who said, "100 People Who Are Screwing Up America is a rollicking and revealing look at 100 of the most egregious obstacles on the path of our nation's return to glory" and Brent Bozell, who commented: "100 People Who Are Screwing Up America is out, and it's a wonderful read for anyone not on that list."

Goldberg also wrote Crazies to the Left of Me, Wimps to the Right: How One Side Lost Its Mind, and the Other Lost Its Nerve in 2007. In 2009, he wrote A Slobbering Love Affair: The True (And Pathetic) Story of the Torrid Romance Between Barack Obama and the Mainstream Media.

Goldberg worked as an on-air contributor for Fox News from 2009 to 2018. He served mostly as a media analyst, but also frequently weighed in on U.S. political issues. In 2018, the network, without explanation, pulled Goldberg off the air for the last 11 months of his contract. They made no effort to re-sign (or even contact) him once his contract expired in December of that year. Goldberg believes he was quietly shelved, and ultimately let go, because of his frequent criticisms of President Donald Trump, which upset Fox viewers. In a column describing the experience, Goldberg wrote, "Fox will tolerate a liberal criticizing President Trump ... but the network didn’t want conservatives taking shots at him. Sometimes I defended the president against what I thought was unfair criticism. But I was also critical of Mr. Trump, of his vindictiveness and his dishonesty... Once they wanted to hear what I said about liberal bias in the news... But now, they didn't even want to hear about that from me, not if there was a chance I was going to also criticize the president."

Goldberg worked as a correspondent for Real Sports with Bryant Gumbel on HBO from 1999 to 2021. Goldberg resigned in January 2021, citing frustration with the show's increasing political slant and imbalance.

== Awards ==
Goldberg has been awarded an Emmy for journalism 14 times (six at CBS News, eight at HBO). For his June 2000 segment "Dominican Free For All", in which he investigated corrupt Major League Baseball recruiting practices in the Dominican Republic, Goldberg won a Sports Emmy for "Outstanding Sports Journalism". He won that award again in 2005 for his story exposing Saudi Arabia's illegal use of young boys as camel jockeys, in 2008 for a story about post-concussion syndrome suffered by some former NFL players, and in 2009 for a story on Real Sports with Bryant Gumbel about the slaughter of racehorses that were no longer making money for their owners.

In May, 2011 Goldberg won another sports Emmy, this one for his story on the connection between head trauma suffered by athletes and a disease similar to ALS, also known as Lou Gehrig's disease. In April 2012, Goldberg won his 12th Emmy, this one for a report on the College Bowl Money Trail. And in May 2017, he won his 13th Emmy for an investigation of the International Olympic Committee. Later that year, in October 2017, Goldberg won another Emmy, a News Emmy in the Investigative Reporting category, for his story on head injuries in youth football. Goldberg received the Alfred I. duPont-Columbia University Award in 2006 for a story on the exploitation of children in the United Arab Emirates. It marked the first time that a sports program had won a duPont award.

In 2012, Goldberg won his second duPont for a body of work on concussions in the NFL, the duPont committee saying that, "Correspondent Bernard Goldberg's interviews are sensitive and probing, moving the story forward. Goldberg and his team investigate the historical precedent of Lou Gehrig bringing to light new information about concussions he suffered as a baseball player at Columbia University and as a Yankee. The reporting raised awareness for the public, the NFL and Congress about this important health issue.

In 2018, Goldberg and a team of Real Sports journalists won another duPont-Columbia Award for a story about the Olympics entitled “Lord of the Rings.” As the duPont committee described it: "This ambitious investigative report—filmed in nine countries—exposed graft and corruption in the IOC and detailed how its members pursue wealth, privilege, and self-glory at the expense of the Games.

In 2020, Goldberg and the Real Sports team won the 2019 Investigative Reporters & Editors sports award for their piece "Game Change." The report focused on the changing demographics of tackle football.

== Books ==
- Bias: A CBS Insider Exposes How the Media Distort the News (2001)
- Arrogance: Rescuing America from the Media Elite (2003)
- 100 People Who Are Screwing Up America (2005)
- Crazies to the Left of Me, Wimps to the Right: How One Side Lost Its Mind, and the Other Lost Its Nerve (2007)
- A Slobbering Love Affair: The True (And Pathetic) Story of the Torrid Romance Between Barack Obama and the Mainstream Media (2009)
