= Fox v. Franken =

Fox News Network LLC v. Penguin Group (USA) Inc.
- Court: United States District Court for the Southern District of New York
- Full case name: Fox News Network LLC v. Penguin Group (USA) Inc. and Alan S. Franken
- Decided: August 22, 2003
- Docket nos.: 1:03-cv-06162
- Citation: 2003 U.S. Dist. LEXIS 18693; 31 Med. L. Rptr. 2254

Court membership
- Judge sitting: Denny Chin

Fox News Network, LLC, v. Penguin Group (USA), Inc., and Alan S. Franken (2003 U.S. Dist. LEXIS 18693; 31 Media L. Rep. 2254) was a civil lawsuit filed in the United States District Court for the Southern District of New York on August 7, 2003. Fox News Channel, the plaintiff, sought to enjoin Al Franken from using Fox News's trademark phrase "fair & balanced" in the title of his then-forthcoming book, Lies and the Lying Liars Who Tell Them: A Fair and Balanced Look at the Right. Judge Denny Chin denied Fox's motion for injunction on August 22, and the network dropped the suit three days later.

== Background ==
Rupert Murdoch's News Corporation had founded Fox News Channel in 1996, in part to counter what it contended was systemic left-wing bias on the part of other U.S. news outlets. To bolster this perception, Fox used "Fair & Balanced" and "We Report. You Decide." as slogans, and obtained federal trademark registrations for each. Critics such as FAIR and Media Matters for America have accused Fox of having a pervasive conservative bias; on many Web sites and blogs, "fair and balanced" became widely used as an ironic euphemism for perceived right-wing media bias on Fox and other media outlets.

On May 31, 2003, the cable network C-SPAN2 broadcast a panel discussion on political books that was taking place at BookExpo America, a trade show for the book publishing industry. The panel included Franken, whose Lies and the Lying Liars Who Tell Them was scheduled for release in the autumn, and Fox News personality Bill O'Reilly, who was promoting his own book Who's Looking Out For You?, which was due for release at about the same time as Franken's. Saying that he felt the need to explain why a fellow panelist's face was on the cover of a book entitled Lies and the Lying Liars Who Tell Them, Franken told a story about O'Reilly's incorrect statements that Inside Edition, a show that he had formerly worked for, had won two Peabody Awards, when it in fact won a Polk Award for work conducted after O'Reilly severed his ties with the program. The two then engaged in a heated confrontation, which culminated in O'Reilly shouting "Shut up! Shut up!" after Franken interrupted him.

== The lawsuit ==
On August 7, 2003, Fox News filed for relief in New York State court. On August 14, Franken's publisher removed the action to the United States District Court for the Southern District of New York on federal question grounds. In what author and editor Richard Blow described as "an eight-inch thick legal filing," the network contended that it had been irreparably harmed by the publicity surrounding Franken's use of the phrase "fair and balanced" on the preliminary cover of Lies and the Lying Liars Who Tell Them, which Fox claimed it had first become aware of following the BookExpo panel discussion in May. The filing stated that Franken had "been described as a 'C-level political commentator' who is 'increasingly unfunny'", and claimed that the comedian was "shrill and unstable" and had "appeared either intoxicated or deranged" at a press correspondents' dinner in April 2003. The filing cited only two sources for those quotes, one of which was a website to which Bill O'Reilly was a contributor, and the other was a website where anyone could contribute. Fox also requested a temporary restraining order (denied August 20, 2003) to restrain the distribution of the book until their request for a preliminary injunction was heard by the court.

In response, Franken joked that he had trademarked the word "funny", and that Fox had infringed his intellectual property rights by characterizing him as "unfunny." Franken's then-unreleased book subsequently rose to the #1 sales position on Amazon.com's best-seller list from number 489 (his second #1 bestseller after Rush Limbaugh Is a Big Fat Idiot and Other Observations, which attained the top of the New York Times' list in 1996).

On August 22, U.S. District Court judge Denny Chin heard arguments from attorneys representing the plaintiff and the defendant regarding Fox News's request for an injunction to prevent Franken from releasing the book with its current title. In a hearing punctuated at times by laughter from the assembled spectators, Chin questioned Fox News attorney Dori Ann Hanswirth harshly about her contention that the phrase "fair and balanced" on the cover of Lies and the Lying Liars Who Tell Them was likely to confuse consumers into believing that the book was produced or endorsed by Fox News Channel. At one point he asked Hanswirth, "Do you think that the reasonable consumer would believe, seeing the word lie above Mr. O'Reilly's face, that Mr. O'Reilly or Fox were endorsing this book?"

Chin denied the injunction and said that the case was "wholly without merit, both factually and legally". He went on to suggest that Fox News' trademark on the phrase "fair and balanced" could be invalid. Three days later, Fox News Channel filed to drop the lawsuit.

Though O'Reilly denies it, Franken believes that the commentator goaded Fox News into suing him. In the paperback edition of his book, Franken recalls an incident at the BookExpo where, as O'Reilly and Fox News colleague Shepard Smith were waiting for a hotel shuttle, O'Reilly said, "I'm gonna sue him! I'm gonna sue him!" A week later, Franken's publisher received a letter from Fox saying they were planning to sue.

== Judge's decision ==
Plaintiff Fox News Network, LLC ("Fox") has moved for a preliminary injunction enjoining defendants from, among other things, using the phrase "Fair and Balanced" in the title of the book, Lies and the Lying Liars Who Tell Them: A Fair and Balanced Look at the Right, written by defendant Al Franken. The motion was scheduled to be heard by the Court on August 22, 2003 at 3:30 p.m.
By letter dated August 19, 2003, Fox requests a temporary restraining order immediately restraining defendants from further distributing the book pending argument on August 22. By letter dated August 20, 2003, defendants oppose the application for a temporary restraining order.
Fox's application for a temporary restraining order is denied. Fox had not previously requested this relief, and the preliminary injunction motion will be heard in two days in any event. I do not believe defendants or their counsel have in any way misled the Court about the release date of the book.
This order is without prejudice to the parties' arguments on the preliminary injunction motion. I will consider the issues on the merits as I decide the motion for a preliminary injunction following the argument on Friday.

SO ORDERED. 2003 U.S. Dist. LEXIS 18693; 31 Media L. Rep. 2254 (2003)

Judge Chin said the case was an easy one, and chided Fox News Network LLC for bringing its complaint to court. The judge said, "Of course, it is ironic that a media company that should be fighting for the First Amendment is trying to undermine it."

== After effects ==
The most direct result of the suit was a windfall for Franken and his publisher, Penguin Group (USA). The book had originally been slated for release on September 22, 2003, but the publicity resulting from the suit prompted Penguin to move the release date up to August 21 and print an extra 50,000 copies, for a total of 435,000; the book was an immediate bestseller. For its part, Fox News Channel was ridiculed by commentators and bloggers on both sides of the political divide, many of whom suggested that the network had filed the suit to placate Bill O'Reilly in the wake of his run-in with Franken at the BookExpo panel.

Drawing on Judge Chin's concluding remarks, Franken suggested that Fox News adopt "wholly without merit" as its new slogan to replace the possibly invalid "fair and balanced". In a more serious response, in December 2003, the Independent Media Institute, publishers of the left-wing website AlterNet, filed a petition to cancel the trademark in the U.S. Patent and Trademark Office's Trademark Trial and Appeal Board, calling it "notoriously misdescriptive." The Institute and Fox settled in 2005, and the TTAB accordingly dismissed the petition without prejudice.

In 2004, Franken began hosting a talk show, originally titled The O'Franken Factor, on the Air America Radio network. The program's title was a jab at Bill O'Reilly's show, named The O'Reilly Factor. Franken said that he chose the name to "annoy and bait" O'Reilly into filing another lawsuit. Three months later, Franken changed the name to The Al Franken Show, which he hosted until 2007, when he announced his candidacy for a United States Senate seat in Minnesota that was to be challenged in 2008. Franken served as a U.S. Senator until January 2, 2018, when he resigned due to sexual misconduct allegations.

The case was documented as part of The First Amendment Project.

== See also ==
- Moron in a hurry, legal phrase
