= Oetken =

Oetken may refer to:

- 9825 Oetken, a main-belt asteroid
- J. Paul Oetken (born 1965), federal judge of the United States District Court for the Southern District of New York
