= Republican Jesus =

Meme

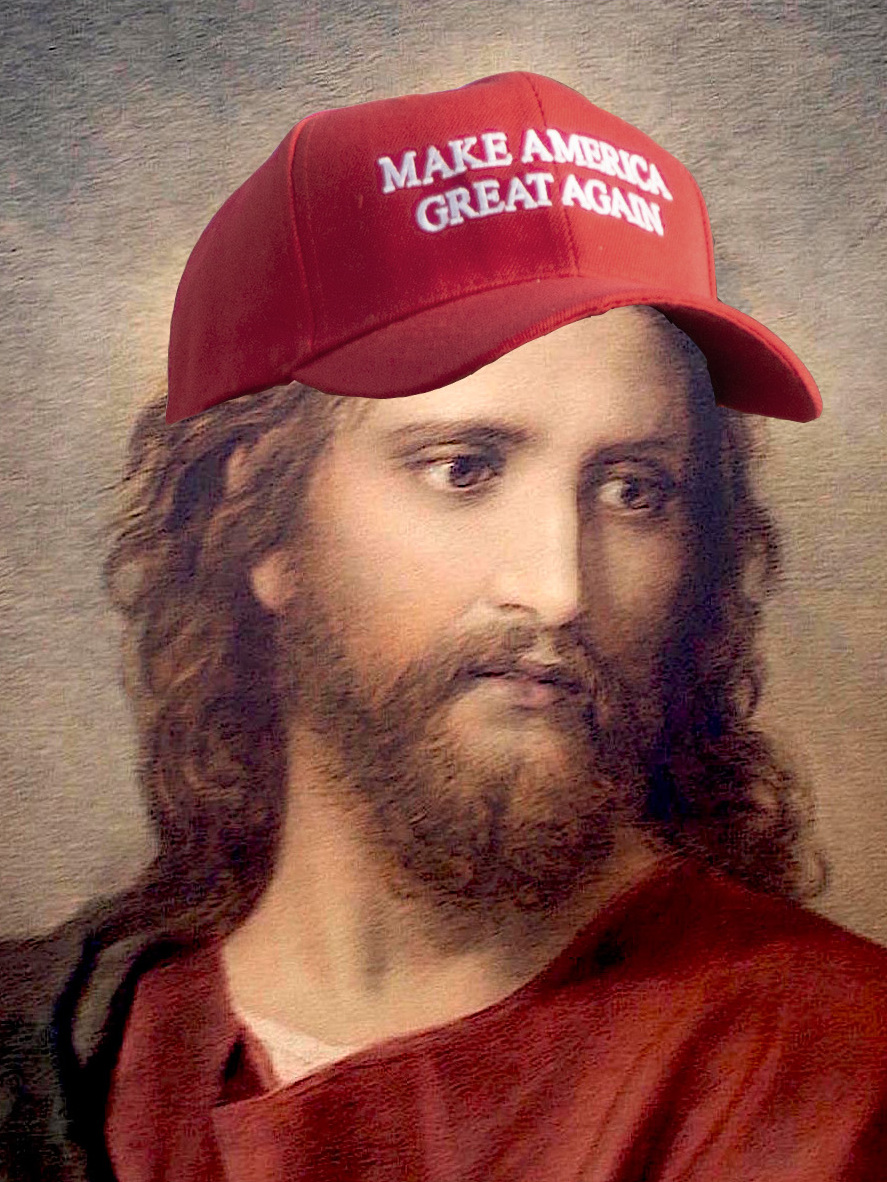
Christ by Heinrich Hofmann, 1889, digitally edited to include a MAGA cap

Republican Jesus, GOP Jesus, or MAGA Jesus is an Internet meme satirizing Republican socially conservative and rugged individualist Christians whose values appear antithetical to the Gospels.

== Overview ==
Republican Jesus memes "often spotlight contradictions between Christian values/beliefs and Republican policies/ideals". In nearly all cases, the meme is built on traditional Western depictions of Jesus Christ superimposed with conservative talking points. Christopher M. Duerringer notes that the memes "often feature Jesus reversing course on his prior position", such as Jesus refusing to heal someone's blindness due to it being a pre-existing condition. Firearms are a frequent subject of the meme, with images of Jesus often being edited to show him wielding them. G. Anthony Keddie states that, to Republicans, "Jesus loves borders, guns, unborn babies, and economic prosperity and hates homosexuality, taxes, welfare, and universal healthcare", while Jack Hitt contrasts Republicans' promotion of the Ten Commandments with Jesus' updating of the Commandments in the Beatitudes. The meme has similarities to the Who Would Jesus Bomb? slogans used during the early 2000s.

A viral video titled "GOP Jesus" portrayed Jesus as if he had adopted Republican policies. It referenced well-known passages including Matthew 25:35-40, satirized as "I was hungry and you gave me something to eat. I was thirsty and you gave me something to drink. And behold, now I'm all lazy and entitled. You shouldn't have done that". In a scene satirizing the parable of the good Samaritan, GOP Jesus is approached by a woman asking for healing, and responds: "but who would pay for it?" The woman has no money, so GOP Jesus responds "Yes, it's a sad story, but it does not make me responsible."

== See also ==
- Supply Side Jesus, a similar concept drawn by Don Simpson for comedian and former United States Senator Al Franken in his 2003 satirical book Lies and the Lying Liars Who Tell Them. The comic depicts Jesus promoting rugged individualism, neoliberalism, and pro-business economics rather than the traditional gospel of charity compassion, or mutual aid.
- Christian Right Economics - influenced by anti-communism, The Christian Right often favor individualist, fiscally conservative, de-regulatory, and protectionist economics
