= The Al Franken Show =

Political radio talk show

- Other names: The O'Franken Factor
- Genre: Progressive talk
- Running time: 3 hours (12 p.m.–3 p.m. ET)
- Country of origin: United States
- Language: English
- Home station: WLIB, New York (2004–2006); KTNF, Minneapolis (2006–2007)
- Syndicates: Air America
- Hosted by: Al Franken; Katherine Lanpher (2004–05)
- Original release: March 31, 2004 – February 14, 2007

The Al Franken Show was the flagship talk show of the former talk radio network, Air America Radio. Hosted by Al Franken, it featured commentary and interviews arguing for liberal positions on the issues of the day, and comically poking fun at the George W. Bush Administration. Franken had been a comedian, satirist, and the author of several books, including the 2003 Lies and the Lying Liars Who Tell Them. He was a writer and performer on Saturday Night Live, where he usually teamed with fellow writer/performer Tom Davis.

The show began as The O'Franken Factor on March 31, 2004. Between January 3, 2006, and February 14, 2007, the show was recorded and broadcast from the 28th floor of the historic Foshay Tower in downtown Minneapolis, Minnesota. Prior to that date it was based in New York City. The final show was broadcast on February 14, 2007, the day Franken announced his candidacy for the United States Senate election of 2008. Franken's bid for the Senate was successful, with him serving there until resigning in 2018.

== History ==
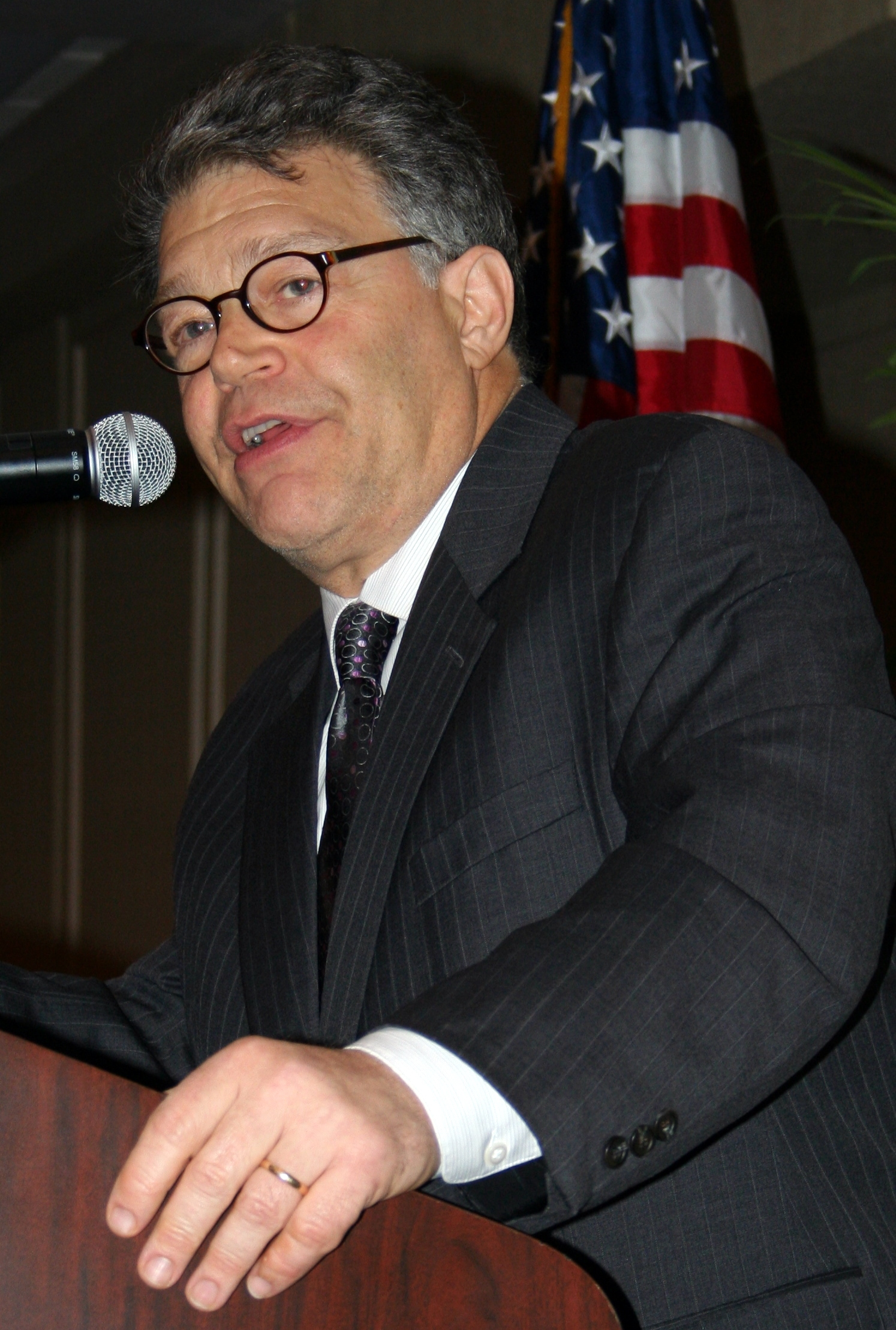
Show host Al Franken

From the show's inception in March 2004 until October 7, 2005, the show was co-hosted by experienced journalist Katherine Lanpher. Lanpher left the show to write Leap Days, a memoir about her experiences moving to New York City. Lanpher did not rejoin the show because she did not wish to move again when Franken relocated to Minnesota. In November 2005, Franken told an audience in Berkeley, California that he would not seek a replacement for Lanpher. Her departure did not substantially change the content of the show.

When the show began, Franken signed a one-year contract. "I'm doing this because I want to use my energies to get Bush unelected. I'd be happy if the election of a Democrat ended the show", he said in an interview with The New York Times. Bush won a second term on November 2, 2004, but Franken said that the show would continue whether a Democrat or a Republican was in office.

Beginning on September 7, 2004, Sundance Channel broadcast a one-hour televised version of the show on weekdays. The show aired its last episode in November 2004. The channel inked a new contract with Franken and aired a second season of the show from June 6, 2005, until early November 2005.

On November 15, 2006, Air America affiliate KQKE-AM in San Francisco announced that Franken would leave Air America on December 10, as indicated by an audio clip posted on Whatamockery.com. After December 10, though Franken was still on Air America, KQKE began airing the Thom Hartmann Program in place of the Al Franken Show.

On his January 29, 2007, show, Franken announced that his last show on Air America Radio would be that Valentine's Day. Affiliates who carried the Franken show carried Thom Hartmann after that date, while XM Satellite Radio now carries Ed Schultz in that time slot. At the end of his final show, Franken announced his intention to run for the United States Senate from Minnesota.

== The O'Franken Factor ==
Until July 12, 2004, the name of the show was The O'Franken Factor. That name was a jibe at Bill O'Reilly and his The O'Reilly Factor. O'Reilly is widely thought to have instigated Fox News Channel's lawsuit against Franken for using their trademarked phrase "fair and balanced", which was thrown out of court in summary judgment, but ended up giving publicity to Franken and his book Lies and the Lying Liars Who Tell Them. Franken said that he chose the title to "annoy and bait" O'Reilly into suing him again, thus generating additional publicity. That lawsuit never came, and on July 12, 2004, the program was renamed The Al Franken Show.

Franken described his show as taking place in a "Zero Spin Zone" where Franken pledged to tell the truth and there was "no spinning allowed". This was a parody of O'Reilly's characterization of the O'Reilly Factor as a "No-Spin Zone".

== Regular guests ==
The show's regular guests included respected progressive issues and current events analysts: Jonathan Alter, David Brock, Joe Conason, John Dickerson, James Fallows, Howard Fineman, Christy Harvey, Paul Krugman, Thomas Oliphant, Norman Ornstein, George Packer, Melanie Sloan, David Sirota, Bernie Sanders, and Lawrence O'Donnell Jr.

== Regular features ==
In addition to general political discussion, the show featured several recurring comic relief segments. These included:

Wait Wait... Don't Lie To Me!
Every Friday afternoon, Franken hosted a mini-game show with fellow judge Joe Conason. The contestant listened to a series of audio clips from earlier in the week, and was asked to identify whether each statement made is the truth, a lie, or a "weasel" (defined as "a statement that is technically true, but intended to mislead"). The title was based on the National Public Radio show Wait Wait... Don't Tell Me! Contestants received a copy of The Al Franken Show Party Album regardless of their performance, though Franken referred to the CD as both the prize for winning and consolation prize for losing. In the spirit of the lying theme, Franken frequently stated that the game won ever increasing numbers of Peabody Awards—over one hundred by the end of the show—which itself was a humorous dig at Bill O'Reilly, who incorrectly boasted that his former show, Inside Edition, won two Peabodies. The segment's theme music was the 1987 Fleetwood Mac hit song "Little Lies".
Hate Email of the Day
Franken picked his favorite hate email and read it on the air, often noting spelling and grammatical errors, and usually concluding with "We take your criticisms very seriously."
Boring Correction
Taking great pride in the veracity of the information cited by his program, Franken invited his audience to bring any factual errors to his attention so they could be addressed. Franken would then issue a live on-air "Boring Correction" where, to a jaunty tune and the sound of typewriter in the background, he corrected the error. Most of the time, the "boring correction" addressed a hypertechnicality rather than a substantive error.
"Resident Dittohead" Mark Luther
The show regularly featured a segment with Mark Luther, Franken's childhood friend and self-proclaimed dittohead. Franken would play a clip by Rush Limbaugh, take issue with Limbaugh's facts or logic, and argue about it with Luther.
Good Ribbin'
A correspondent would travel to some of the best southern barbecue hot spots in the country, to talk with people who love barbecue and hate Franken's show. Patrons were invited to tell the audience what they were eating and then argue with Franken.
The Fifteen Second Debunk
An audio clip was played, and then debunked by another audio clip from the same person. Although the two clips were usually less than fifteen seconds, they were preceded by very lengthy introduction and followed by a lengthy outro.
Nigel Chestley
Franken played a BBC correspondent who sometimes reported on international news, and other times simply provided an update on the Queen's long running drum solo.
Senior Moment
Franken played Enid Davenport, a crotchety old woman who offered an extremely confused perspective on the news (she preferred to call the segment "A piece of my mind"). This character was somewhat reminiscent of Gilda Radner's Emily Litella from Saturday Night Live.
The Slide Whistle
Franken played a slide whistle along with the highs and lows of President Bush's approval rating since taking office. The whistle started with a moderate note, raised to a high note to reflect the time period following 9/11, then steadily sunk to lower notes as Bush's popularity decreased (with occasional blips of higher notes in between). This was a popular segment surrounding State of the Union addresses.
Right-Wing Non-Lie of the Day
Franken would play a clip of a conservative telling a "non-lie," which would usually last for about ten seconds. On The Very Best of the O'Franken Factor, featured non-lies included Rush Limbaugh saying he was looking at an op-ed piece in the Wall Street Journal and Bill O'Reilly reading the definition of the word "conundrum".

Some other skits no longer occurred regularly after Katherine Lanpher left the show. These included:

- The Oy Yoy Yoy Show, in which Franken played "old Al" and responded to a litany of depressing news items by saying "Oy", along with a constant expression of concern for Israel
- Mastication Theater, in which Franken and Lanpher would perform a skit while stuffing their mouths with food

== Swing State Tour ==
In the run-up to the 2004 U.S. presidential election, the show went on a "Swing State Tour" that included stops in

- San Diego, California (though California was not often considered a swing state)
- San Francisco, California
- Denver, Colorado
- Minneapolis, Minnesota
- Madison, Wisconsin
- Columbus, Ohio
- Miami, Florida

== Music ==
- Theme: Grateful Dead - "Terrapin Station" (live)
- Grateful Dead - "Sugaree" (live)
- Grateful Dead - "China Cat Sunflower" (live)
- Commercial Bumpers: Grateful Dead "Going Down the Road Feeling Bad" (live)
- The Klezmatics - "N.Y. Psycho Freylekhs" (used for "The Oy Yoy Yoy Show" segment)
- many original compositions of Adam Albright-Hanna, including the phone number song, "866-303-2270"
- Grateful Dead - "Touch Of Grey" (last segment intro, later replaced by "Sultans Of Swing")
- Dire Straits - Sultans of Swing (Plays this song until "that note", after commercials)
- Jerry Garcia - "The Wheel" Garcia
- Fleetwood Mac - "Little Lies" (the theme song to "Wait Wait... Don't Lie To Me!")

The show also did musical parody introductions for regular guests:

- "Jonnie Alter" (to introduce Jonathan Alter) - Parody of Shelley Fabares' "Johnny Angel"
- "We Will Brock You" (to introduce David Brock) - Parody of Queen's "We Will Rock You"
- "Carry On Joe Conason" (to introduce Joe Conason) - Parody of Kansas' "Carry on Wayward Son"
- "Oh Howard You're So Fine" (to introduce Howard Fineman) - Parody of Toni Basil's "Mickey"
- "Christy" (to introduce Christy Harvey) - Parody of Johnny Mathis' "Misty"
- "Can't Touch This" (to introduce Paul Krugman) - Parody of MC Hammer's "Can't Touch This"
- "Hey Judd" (to introduce Judd Legum) - Parody of The Beatles' "Hey Jude"
- "Oh Donnell" (to introduce Lawrence O'Donnell) - Parody of Ritchie Valens' "Donna"
- "Baby Oliphant Walk" (to introduce Tom Oliphant) - Parody of Henry Mancini's "Baby Elephant Walk"
- "Norm in the USA" (to introduce Norman Ornstein) - Parody of Bruce Springsteen's "Born in the USA"
- "My Sirota" (to introduce David Sirota) - Parody of The Knack's "My Sharona"
- "Melanie Sloan" (to introduce Melanie Sloan) - Parody of George Thorogood and the Destroyer's "Bad to the Bone"

== Staff ==
The staff of The Al Franken Show:

- Host: Al Franken
- Executive Producer: Billy Kimball
- Senior Producer: Gabrielle Zuckerman (2003-2005)
- Producer: Ben Wikler; later J.R. Norton
- Associate Producers: Joel Meyer and Chris Rosen
- Engineer and Researcher: Andy 'Scooter' Barr
- Webwriter and Researcher: Eric Hananoki
- Researcher: Miranda Wilson
- Administrative Assistant: Kathy Kostohryz
