= Denny Chin =

American federal judge (born 1954)

- 陳卓光
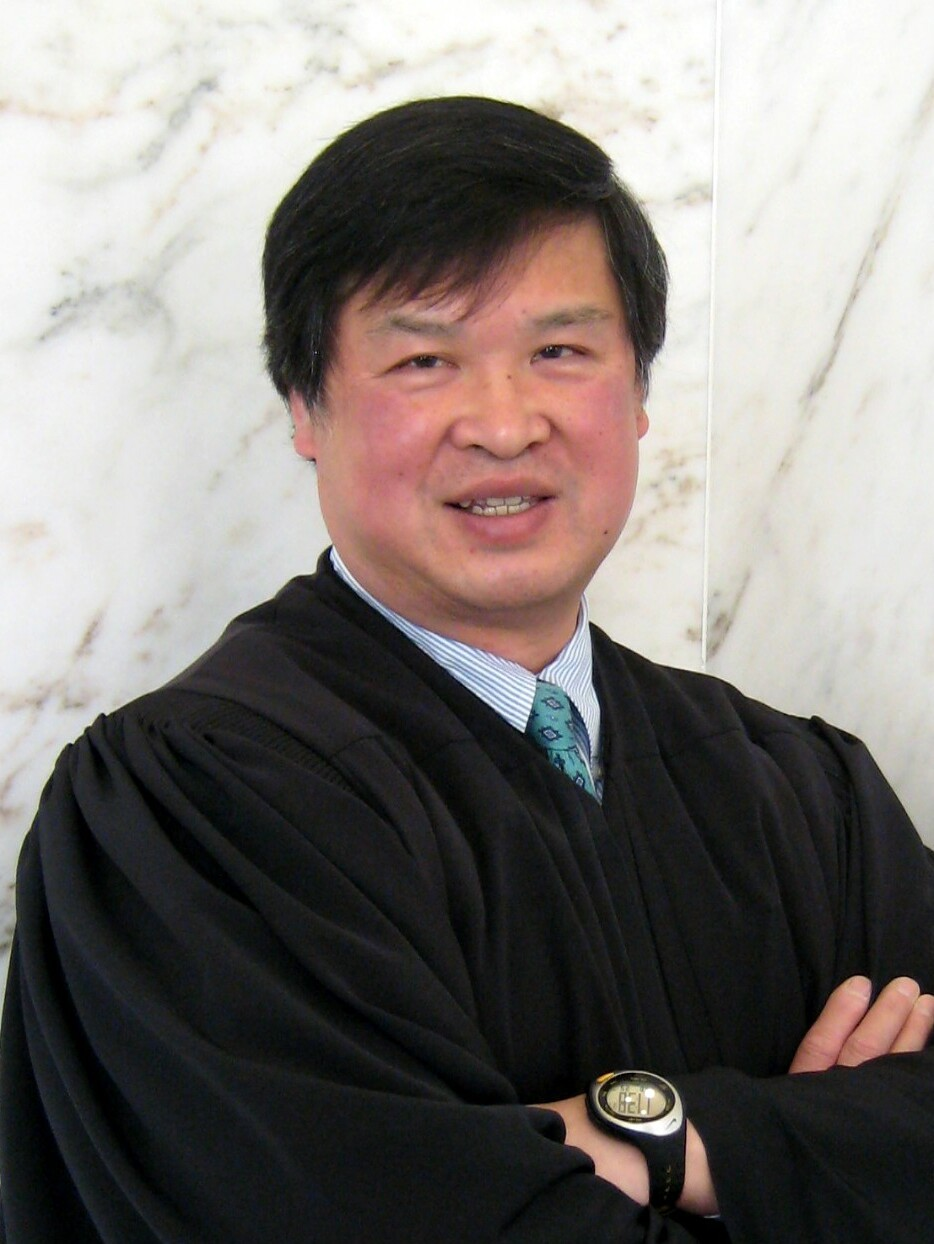

Senior Judge of the United States Court of Appeals for the Second Circuit
- Incumbent
- Assumed office June 1, 2021

Judge of the United States Court of Appeals for the Second Circuit
- In office April 23, 2010 – June 1, 2021
- Appointed by: Barack Obama
- Preceded by: Robert D. Sack
- Succeeded by: Myrna Pérez

Judge of the United States District Court for the Southern District of New York
- In office August 10, 1994 – April 26, 2010
- Appointed by: Bill Clinton
- Preceded by: Seat established
- Succeeded by: J. Paul Oetken

Personal details
- Born: Check Kong Chin; April 13, 1954 (age 72) Kowloon, British Hong Kong
- Spouse: Kathy Hirata
- Education: Princeton University (BA); Fordham University (JD)

Denny Chin (Chinese: 陳卓光; born April 13, 1954) is an American lawyer and jurist serving as a senior U.S. circuit judge of the United States Court of Appeals for the Second Circuit. He was appointed in 2010 by President Barack Obama. Chin previously served as a U.S. district judge of the United States District Court for the Southern District of New York, having been appointed in 1994 by President Bill Clinton. Chin was the first Asian American appointed as a United States District Judge outside of the Ninth Circuit.

== Early life and education ==
Chin was born in 1954 in Kowloon, Hong Kong, and came to the U.S. in 1956. He graduated from Stuyvesant High School in 1971. He graduated magna cum laude with a B.A. in psychology from Princeton University in 1975 after completing a 130-page long senior thesis titled "The Old Ones of Chinatown: A Study of the Elderly Chinese." While a student at Princeton, Chin was a staff writer and later managing editor at The Daily Princetonian. In 1978, Chin graduated from Fordham University School of Law with a Juris Doctor. As a law student, he was the managing editor of the Fordham Law Review. Chin currently teaches first year Legal Writing at Fordham as an adjunct professor.

== Early career ==
Following a 1978 to 1980 clerkship with Judge Henry Frederick Werker in the Southern District, Chin worked for the law firm of Davis Polk & Wardwell from 1980 to 1982. He was an Assistant United States Attorney for the Southern District from 1982 to 1986. In 1986, Chin left the U.S. Attorney's Office and started a law firm, Campbell, Patrick & Chin, with two colleagues from the U.S. Attorney's Office. In 1990, he joined the law firm Vladeck, Waldman, Elias & Engelhard, P.C., where he specialized in labor and employment law and represented employees and unions.

== Federal judicial service ==
President Bill Clinton nominated Chin to the Southern District bench on March 24, 1994, to a new seat created by 104 Stat. 5089. The United States Senate confirmed Chin on August 9, 1994, and Chin received his commission the next day. His service as a district court judge was terminated on April 26, 2010, when he was elevated to the court of appeals.

On October 6, 2009, President Barack Obama nominated Chin to the United States Court of Appeals for the Second Circuit. The United States Senate Committee on the Judiciary reported Chin's nomination to the full Senate on December 10, 2009 and he was confirmed by a 98–0 vote on April 22, 2010. He received his judicial commission on April 23, 2010. He was sworn in as a Circuit Judge on April 26, 2010. Chin assumed senior status on June 1, 2021.

=== Notable cases ===
In 2001, Chin rejected a motion by the Parents Television Council (PTC) to dismiss a lawsuit that the World Wrestling Federation (now World Wrestling Entertainment) filed against it. At the time, the PTC had been campaigning for advertisers to withdraw sponsorship of WWE's flagship program SmackDown because it believed that the program caused the violent deaths of four children. Chin's ruling came on the grounds that WWF had a sound basis in suing the PTC over defamation, interference with business, and copyright infringement. PTC and WWE settled out of court and, as part of the settlement agreement, the PTC paid WWF $3.5 million USD and PTC president Bozell issued a public apology.

In Fox v. Franken, Chin denied Fox News Channel (who alleged a trademark violation) an injunction against Al Franken's Book Lies and the Lying Liars Who Tell Them: A Fair and Balanced Look at the Right.

Chin also presided over the criminal prosecution of Larry Stewart, the handwriting expert who was accused of committing perjury during the trial of Martha Stewart (no relation). Larry Stewart was acquitted by a jury.

Chin presided over the criminal trial of Pak Dong-seon in connection with Pak's alleged involvement in the scandal surrounding the United Nations Oil-for-Food Program. Pak was convicted by a jury and sentenced by Chin to 5 years in prison.

Chin dismissed the suit Sam Sloan vs. Paul Truong and Susan Polgar in which Sloan accused Susan Polgar and Paul Truong of posting thousands of obscene "Fake Sam Sloan" remarks in his name over a two-year period in an effort to win election to the board of the United States Chess Federation (Polgar and Truong were elected to the board and Sloan was defeated).

Chin presided over the criminal trial of Oscar Wyatt, the Texas oil executive accused of making kick-backs to the Saddam Hussein regime during the UN Oil-For-Food Program. In the middle of his trial, Wyatt changed his plea to guilty as part of a plea bargain with the government.

He was assigned the Google Book Search Settlement Agreement case on January 8, 2009, after the death of the previous supervising judge. On March 23, 2011, Chin rejected Google's plan to digitize every book published, saying the plan violated copyright laws. In November 2013, Chin dismissed Authors Guild et al. v. Google. On April 18, 2016, the Supreme Court turned down an appeal.

In 2012, Chin presided over the criminal sentencing of Anil Kumar, a senior executive of McKinsey and Company in the Galleon Group insider trading investigation. Chin sentenced Kumar to 2 years of probation.

In 2016, Chin joined the panel that upheld Tom Brady's suspension by NFL Commissioner Roger Goodell for the Deflategate scandal.

In May 2024, the Supreme Court ruled unanimously in the First Amendment case of National Rifle Association of America v. Vullo, favoring the NRA's case against New York insurance regulator Maria Vullo. This ruling overturned the decision of Chin and his two fellow Second Circuit jurists, Susan Carney and Rosemary Pooler.

==== U.S. v. Madoff ====
In 2009, Chin presided over U.S. v. Madoff. Madoff admitted to committing securities fraud via a Ponzi scheme starting in the early 1990s, which involved potentially as much as $65 billion. On March 12, 2009, Madoff pleaded guilty to 11 federal charges relating to the scheme. Following his pleading, Chin revoked Madoff's $10 million bail and ordered him to report immediately to jail at the request of the federal prosecutors, citing that Madoff had both the resources and the incentive to flee before his formal sentencing. On June 29, 2009, Chin rejected a sentencing request from Madoff's attorneys for between 12-20 years imprisonment with the possibility of parole, and accepted the prosecutor's recommendation to sentence Madoff to a prison term of 150 years which he bluntly stated would put Madoff behind bars until he died. Chin explained that imposing the maximum sentence on Madoff was appropriate because he had concluded that Madoff's crimes were "staggering" and "extraordinary evil" and wanted the sentence to have a stronger deterrent effect.

In 2020, Madoff requested compassionate release due to terminal kidney disease. He also publicly pleaded with Chin to accept a telephone call from prison so he could make his case for clemency. Chin denied both the overall request and the phone query, writing that his sentence was meant to ensure Madoff died in prison, and that he had no subsequent reason to believe he deserved any differently. He also said that the notion that he would be swayed by a phone call was ridiculous, and that he didn't know (or care) what Madoff felt would be the reason that such a call was warranted.

== Personal life ==
Chin is married to Kathy Hirata Chin, a partner at Cadwalader, Wickersham & Taft. Together, they and several others from the Asian American Bar Association of New York annually produce and perform trial reenactments of important cases like the trial of Ethel Rosenberg and the Minoru Yasui case.

His grandfather is a paper son.

== See also ==
- Barack Obama Supreme Court candidates
- Chinese Americans in New York City
- List of Asian American jurists
- List of first minority male lawyers and judges in the United States

Legal offices
New seat	Judge of the United States District Court for the Southern District of New York; 1994–2010	Succeeded by J. Paul Oetken
Preceded by Robert D. Sack	Judge of the United States Court of Appeals for the Second Circuit; 2010–2021	Succeeded by Myrna Pérez
