= Myrna Pérez =

American judge (born 1974)

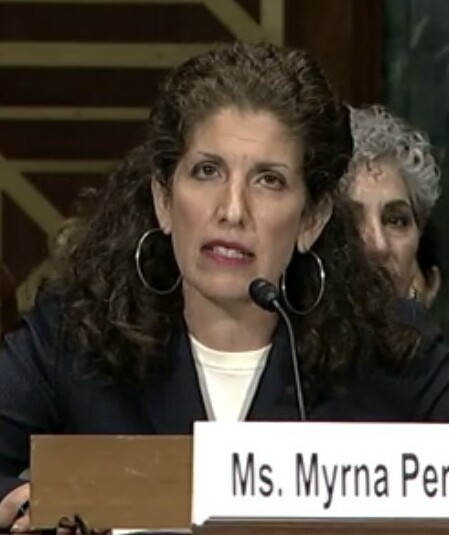

Judge of the United States Court of Appeals for the Second Circuit
- Incumbent
- Assumed office November 12, 2021
- Appointed by: Joe Biden
- Preceded by: Denny Chin

Personal details
- Born: 1974 (age 51–52) San Antonio, Texas, U.S.
- Education: Yale University (BA); Harvard University (MPP); Columbia University (JD)

Myrna Pérez (born August 14, 1974) is an American lawyer serving as a United States circuit judge of the United States Court of Appeals for the Second Circuit. She was previously the director of voting rights at the Brennan Center for Justice.

== Early life and education ==
Pérez is a native of San Antonio, Texas. She earned a Bachelor of Arts degree from Yale University in 1996, a Master of Public Policy from the Harvard Kennedy School in 1998, and a Juris Doctor from Columbia Law School in 2003.

== Career ==
Pérez began her career as a policy analyst in the Government Accountability Office. She was later a law clerk for judges Anita B. Brody of the United States District Court for the Eastern District of Pennsylvania and Julio M. Fuentes of the United States Court of Appeal for the Third Circuit. Pérez joined the Brennan Center for Justice in 2006 and left in 2021 after being confirmed as a federal judge. She has been a lecturer at Columbia Law School and an adjunct professor at the New York University School of Law. Perez co-authored reports about voter purges in 2008 and 2018. Pérez also authored reports on wait times at polling locations for people of color, the impact of resource allocation on election day, and voter identification.

=== Federal judicial service ===
On June 15, 2021, President Joe Biden announced his intent to nominate Pérez to serve as a United States circuit judge for the United States Court of Appeals for the Second Circuit to the seat vacated by Judge Denny Chin, who assumed senior status on June 1, 2021. On July 14, 2021, a hearing on her nomination was held before the Senate Judiciary Committee. During her hearing, Pérez was questioned about her voting rights advocacy, including an article she had written called "The GOP Campaign to Make Elections Less Free." Pérez said that she didn't write or approve the article headline, and pledged to set aside her past advocacy work if confirmed to the court. On August 5, 2021, her nomination was reported out of committee by a 12–10 vote. On October 19, 2021, Majority Leader Chuck Schumer filed cloture on her nomination. On October 21, 2021, the United States Senate invoked cloture on her nomination by a 51–48 vote. On October 25, 2021, her nomination was confirmed by a 48–43 vote. She received her judicial commission on November 12, 2021.

== Personal life ==
Pérez married Mark Muntzel, a mechanical engineer, in 2007.

== See also ==
- List of Hispanic and Latino American jurists
- Joe Biden judicial appointment controversies

Legal offices
Preceded by Denny Chin	Judge of the United States Court of Appeals for the Second Circuit; 2021–present	Incumbent
