= Christy Harvey =

Christy Felling (née Harvey) is director of strategic media and external affairs for Share Our Strength.

From 2003 to 2010, she helped lead strategic communications at the Center for American Progress. She was a regular guest on The Al Franken Show. She also edited a free news website for the Center called Mic Check. She is a former research director at The Wall Street Journal.

Growing up in Dover, Delaware, Harvey attended Caesar Rodney High School, then Washington and Lee University in Lexington, Virginia. She currently resides in Anchorage, Alaska.
