= Why Not Me? (novel) =

1999 political satire novel by Al Franken

- First edition
- Author: Al Franken
- Language: English
- Genre: Political satire
- Publisher: Delacorte Press
- Publication date: 12 January 1999
- Publication place: United States
- Media type: Print (Hardback & Paperback)
- ISBN: 0-385-32924-5

Why Not Me? is a 1999 political satire novel by Al Franken.

== Synopsis ==
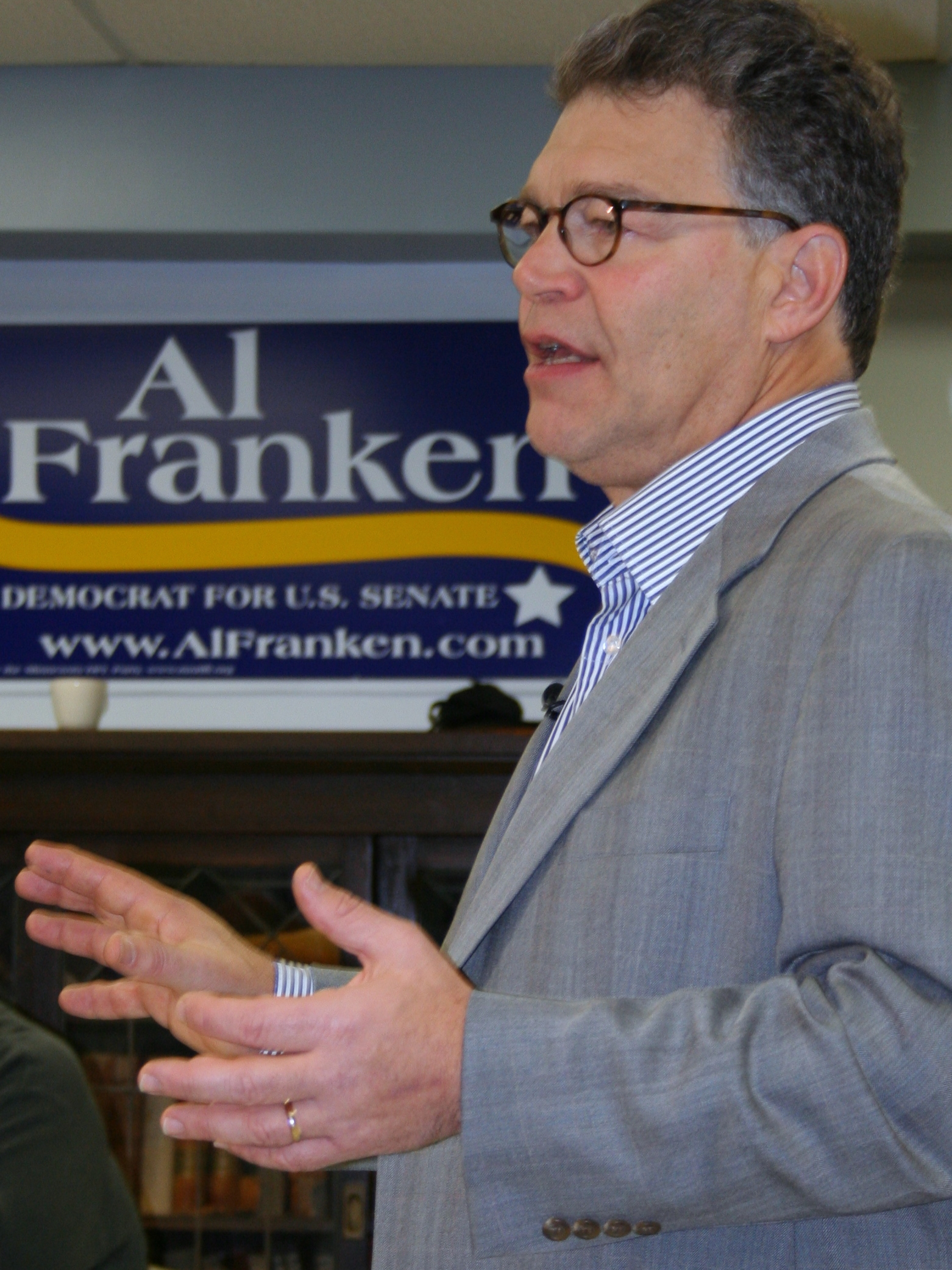
Franken campaigning for U.S. Senate

The book is made up of three different sections. First is Franken's autobiography, Daring to Lead. Second is a campaign diary, following Franken and his campaign staff across the primary states of Iowa and New Hampshire. The final section, supposedly written by Bob Woodward, is a behind-the-scenes account of Franken's first hundred days as president, titled The Void. There is also an epilogue, set several decades after the plot, giving historical perspective on the Franken presidency and Franken's post-presidential life.

=== The Campaign ===
The book starts with Daring to Lead, Franken's campaign autobiography, in which he recounts his life from his childhood in the fictional town of Christhaven, Minnesota, to his college years, to his career on NBC's Saturday Night Live. We learn later from Franken's campaign diary that some parts of Daring to Lead are completely fabricated.

The diary describes Franken's experiences in the race. He starts out as a dark horse Democratic candidate, running on a single-issue platform (ATM fees). In the diary, Franken routinely insults the residents of New Hampshire and Iowa and describes numerous extramarital affairs, illegal actions, ridiculous campaign promises, and disastrous schemes designed to bolster Franken's poll numbers. Despite Franken's deceit, he is eventually given the Democratic nomination due to a rise in support after the Y2K bug creates glitches solely on ATMs. He is elected president in an unprecedented landslide victory.

=== The Presidency ===
The Void, a book supposedly written by Bob Woodward, describes Franken's brief and turbulent tenure at the White House. After Franken makes a bizarre inauguration speech apologizing for slavery, the resulting backlash sends Franken into depression. Franken's aides give him anti-depressant drugs, but this causes Franken to display strange behavior. Franken has himself cloned, punches Nelson Mandela in the stomach during a state meeting, and hatches a dangerous plan to assassinate Saddam Hussein by flying to Iraq and hitting him with a plaque that reads, "World's Greatest Grandpa." Congress forms a committee to investigate Franken's mood swings, which leads to the unraveling of his administration. After his diary is publicized, Franken is forced to resign.

The epilogue reveals that Franken's clone (parented by then-couple Ellen DeGeneres and Anne Heche) is now the head of Franken's presidential library. Franken's entire cabinet was impeached along with the President, and all served varied prison terms; Franken pardoned himself before resigning. Franken's term is revealed to have actually had some benefits: his campaign for Russia to enter NATO provides important global security; his Vice President, Joe Lieberman, turns out to be the greatest President in history and serves eighteen years in office; and his dismantling of the remains of the Glass–Steagall Act benefits his boosters in the insurance industry.

Most of the characters in the book are real people, but the events are fictional.

== Characters ==
- Otto Franken – Al's violent and alcoholic (fictional) brother, who attacks members of the press with two-by-fours and disguises himself and uses aliases like "Dotto Dranken", "Botto Branken" and "Klotto Klanken" to mock Al Gore.
- Dan Haggerty – TV's Grizzly Adams, whom the campaign uses for celebrity endorsement.
- Norm Ornstein – A well-respected fellow at the American Enterprise Institute and friend of Franken. He is the campaign manager, and later the White House chief of staff.
- Howard Fineman – former Newsweek reporter who is goaded into being the Franken campaign's public relations spokesman, and later becomes the White House press secretary.
- Dick Morris – A famous pollster for Bill Clinton who joins Franken's campaign to develop strategy and raise money.
- Frank Luntz – a Republican pollster who, Al thinks, is on the campaign only because he's a "starfucker."
- Joe Lieberman – Franken's vice president. In reality, Lieberman declared himself an independent after the elections.
- Sandy Koufax – former professional baseball player who becomes Franken's Secretary of Veterans Affairs.
- Al Gore – former vice president whom Franken politically destroyed during the 2000 Iowa primary; later became a congressman from Tennessee.
- Franni Franken – Al's (real life) wife who is eventually used by the campaign after a heroic rescue of an old man in New Hampshire.

== Writing style ==
Franken writes his own character as a blowhard who does not fully understand political issues and who, therefore, falls back on such clichés as "The United States is the only remaining Superpower."

In the (fictional) Franken diary, he uses initials to refer to various people and political blocs, such as "O." for his fictional brother, Otto, and "S.P." for the supposedly "stupid people" whom he meets every time he attends a political rally. He also uses initials to refer to various young women with whom he is having affairs, the fact of which he hopes to conceal from his wife.

In the first part of the book, he portrays his children, Thomasin and Joseph (real people), as being against his running for the Presidency.

== Parallels to future events ==
Franken correctly predicted that Joe Lieberman would be the Democratic Party's vice presidential nominee in the 2000 presidential election.

In 2008, Franken officially announced his candidacy for Norm Coleman's Minnesota seat in the U.S. Senate in the 2008 election. He was eventually victorious, following a protracted recount.

In 2017, several columnists wrote about the possibility of Franken running in the 2020 United States presidential election, in spite of his dismissing the idea the prior year.

In 2017, Franken was accused by various women of sexual misconduct before and after his time as a U.S. Senator. This is similar to what he claims to do in the diary section of the book.
