= Lies and the Lying Liars Who Tell Them =

2003 book by Al Franken

- Author: Al Franken
- Language: English
- Subject: American politics, American conservatism
- Genre: Political satire
- Publisher: Dutton Penguin
- Publication date: 2003
- Media type: Hardcover/paperback
- ISBN: 9780452285217
- OCLC: 884599126
- Dewey Decimal: 320.9730207
- LC Class: E885 .F728 2003
- Preceded by: Rush Limbaugh is a Big Fat Idiot and Other Observations
- Followed by: The Truth (With Jokes)

Lies and the Lying Liars Who Tell Them is a satirical book on American politics by Al Franken, a comedian, political commentator, and later politician. It was published in 2003 by Dutton Penguin. Franken had a study group of 14 Harvard graduate students known as "TeamFranken" to help him with the research. The book's subtitle, A Fair and Balanced Look at the Right, is a parody of Fox News' tagline "Fair and Balanced." Fox sued Franken over the use of the phrase in a short-lived and unsuccessful lawsuit, which has been credited with increasing the sales of the book, an example of the Streisand effect.

Lies is one of several books published in 2003 written by American liberals challenging the viewpoints of conservatives such as Bernard Goldberg, Bill O'Reilly, Sean Hannity and Ann Coulter. These books by Franken and fellow authors such as Joe Conason, Michael Moore and Jim Hightower were described by columnist Molly Ivins as the "great liberal backlash of 2003."

== Summary ==
Lies and the Lying Liars Who Tell Them largely targets prominent Republicans and conservatives, highlighting what Franken asserts are documentable lies in their claims. A significant portion of the book is devoted to comparisons between then-sitting President George W. Bush and former president Bill Clinton regarding their economic, environmental, and military policies. Franken also criticizes several pundits, especially those he believes to be the most dishonest, including O'Reilly, Hannity, and Coulter. The book includes two comics, "The Gospel of Supply Side Jesus", a cartoon by Don Simpson, which parodies the seemingly un-Christian policies of Republicans who frequently invoke Christianity (like the Republican Jesus meme), and "Operation Chickenhawk: Episode One", which features Vietnam veterans (and prominent Democrats) John Kerry and Al Gore leading a group of popular neoconservatives—none of whom actually served in the Vietnam War—into battle, only to get fragged by the cowardly "chickenhawk" neocons. The episdoe also features non-neoconservatives like paleoconservatie Pat Buchanan and more libertarian-leaning George Will.

== Publicity ==
Fox News sought damages from Franken, claiming in its lawsuit that the book's subtitle violated its trademark of the slogan "Fair and Balanced". The lawsuit was dismissed, and backfired on Fox News by providing Franken with free publicity just as the book was launched. "The book was originally scheduled to be released Sept. 22 but will be made available Aug. 21," according to its publisher. "We sped up the release because of tremendous demand for the book, generated by recent events."

In the lawsuit, Fox described Franken as "intoxicated or deranged" as well as "shrill and unstable." In response, Franken joked that he had trademarked the word "funny", and that Fox had infringed his intellectual property rights by characterizing him as "unfunny." The publicity resulting from the lawsuit propelled Franken's yet-to-be-released book to #1 on Amazon.com.

On August 22, 2003, U.S. District Judge Denny Chin denied Fox's request for an injunction to block the publication of Franken's book, characterizing the network's claim as "wholly without merit, both factually and legally." During the judge's questioning, spectators in the court's gallery frequently laughed at Fox's case. Franken later joked, "Usually when you say someone was literally laughed out of court, you mean they were figuratively laughed out of court, but Fox was literally laughed out of court." Three days later, Fox filed to dismiss its lawsuit.

Franken describes the legal battle in a paperback-only chapter of Lies entitled "I Win".

== Reception ==
In a largely favorable review of Franken's book in the Washington newspaper The Hill, reviewer Mary Lynn F. Jones wrote: "Franken's tendency to mix fact with fiction [also] left me wondering sometimes what was true and what wasn't." As an example, she cited a passage in Franken's book in which he wrote that former Bush foreign policy advisor Richard Armitage "bolted" from a Senate hearing and "[knocked] over veteran reporter Helen Thomas, breaking her hip and jaw". The paperback version has a footnote saying, "The Helen Thomas thing is a joke."

=== Recognition ===
The audiobook version was awarded the 2004 Grammy Award for Best Spoken Word Album.

== Editions ==
- ISBN 0-525-94764-7 (hardcover, 2003)
- ISBN 0-452-28521-6

== See also ==
- Media bias in the United States
- Republican Jesus
