= J. Paul Oetken =

American judge (born 1965)

Paul Oetken

Judge of the United States District Court for the Southern District of New York
- Incumbent
- Assumed office July 20, 2011
- Appointed by: Barack Obama
- Preceded by: Denny Chin

Personal details
- Born: James Paul Oetken; 1965 (age 60–61) Louisville, Kentucky, U.S.
- Spouse: Makky Pratayot (m. 2014)
- Education: University of Iowa (BA); Yale University (JD)

James Paul Oetken (/ˈɛtkɪn/ EHT-kin; born 1965), known professionally as J. Paul Oetken, is a United States district judge of the United States District Court for the Southern District of New York. He is the first openly gay man to be confirmed as an Article III judge.

== Early life and education ==
Oetken was born in 1965, in Louisville, Kentucky. He was valedictorian and class president at Regis High School in Cedar Rapids, Iowa. He earned a Bachelor of Arts degree from the University of Iowa in 1988, and a Juris Doctor from Yale Law School in 1991. Oetken served as a law clerk for Judge Richard Cudahy of the United States Court of Appeals for the Seventh Circuit from 1991 to 1992. Then, he clerked for Judge Louis F. Oberdorfer of the United States District Court for the District of Columbia from 1992 to 1993. Lastly, he clerked for Associate Justice Harry Blackmun of the United States Supreme Court from 1993 to 1994.

== Career ==
During the mid-1990s, Oetken worked as an associate with the law firm of Jenner & Block. In 1997, he joined the Office of Legal Counsel in the United States Department of Justice as an attorney-advisor, where he worked until becoming an associate counsel to the president of the United States in the office of the White House Counsel in 1999. He held that job until President Bill Clinton left office in 2001. From 2001 until 2003, Oetken worked as an associate at the law firm of Debevoise & Plimpton, including as counsel in 2003 and 2004. In 2004, Oetken joined Cablevision Systems Corporation as its associate general counsel, until 2011 when he left to join the federal bench.

=== Federal judicial service ===
On January 26, 2011, President Barack Obama nominated Oetken to serve on the United States District Court for the Southern District of New York to replace Judge Denny Chin, who was elevated to the United States Court of Appeals for the Second Circuit. New York Senator Charles Schumer recommended Oetken to the post. Schumer recommended Oetken a year after he recommended former Assistant United States Attorney Daniel S. Alter, also openly gay, whom the White House declined to nominate after concluding, because of statements that had been attributed to Alter, that his nomination was unlikely to survive the 60-vote threshold needed to overcome a filibuster in the Senate. Schumer stated that diversity was a consideration in his recommendations for federal judgeships, and that he was "shocked to learn" that no openly gay men had served on the federal bench. The Senate confirmed Oetken on July 18, 2011, by an 80–13 vote. He received his commission on July 20, 2011. At the time of his confirmation, Oetken was the second openly gay Article III judge in the country, after Deborah Batts, and the first openly gay male federal judge.

== Personal life ==
Oetken lives with his husband, Makky Pratayot, in Manhattan. They were married on September 6, 2014, at the Jane by Judge Alison Nathan.

== See also ==
- Joe Biden Supreme Court candidates
- List of law clerks for the second seat of the Supreme Court of the United States
- List of LGBT jurists in the United States
- Lev Parnas

Legal offices
Preceded by Denny Chin	Judge of the United States District Court for the Southern District of New York; 2011–present	Incumbent
