= Katherine Lanpher =

American journalist

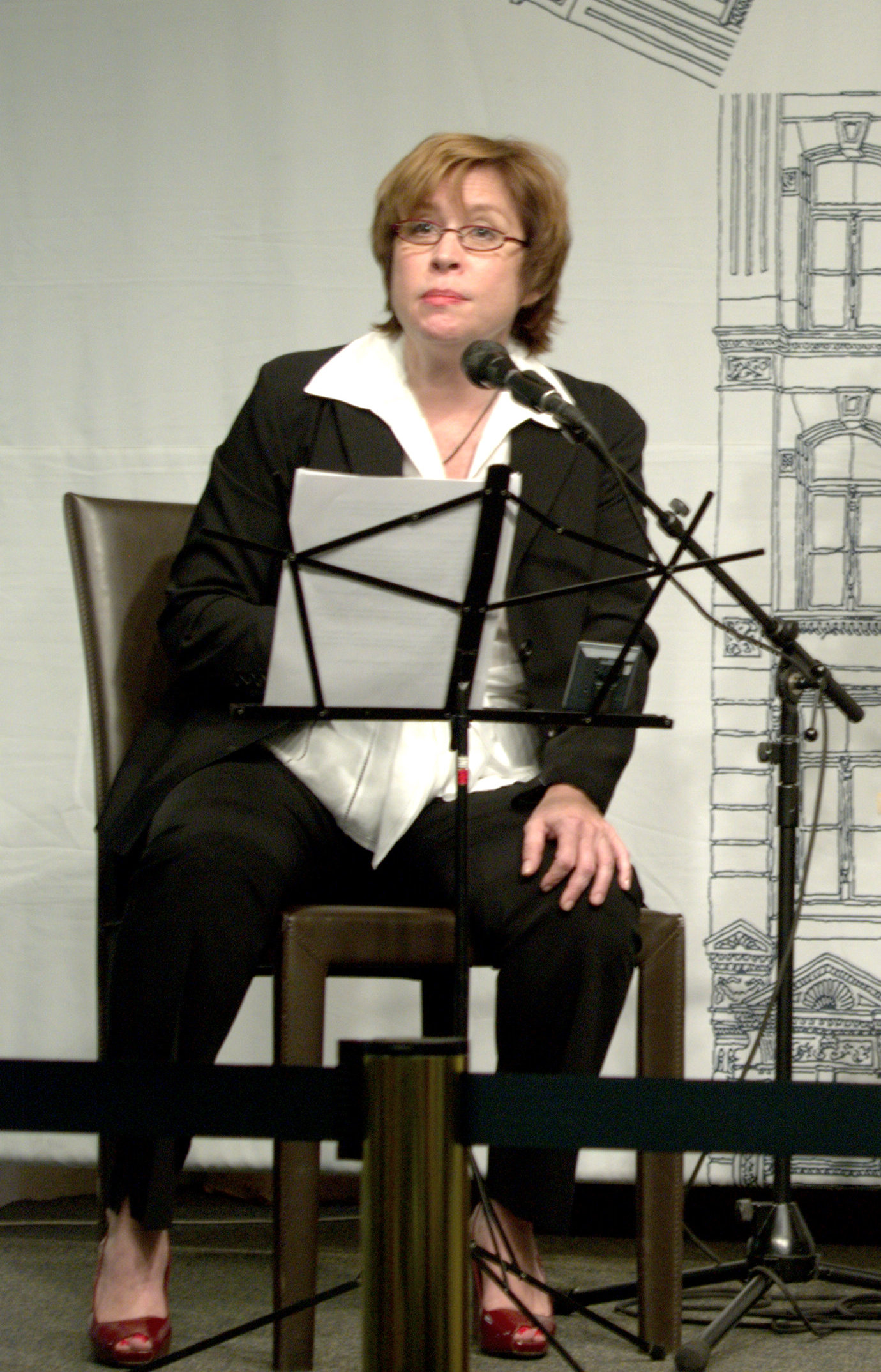
- Lanpher in New York City, 2009.
- Born: 1959 (age 66–67); Moline, Illinois
- Education: Northwestern University, University of Chicago
- Occupations: Writer; journalist; broadcaster; podcaster
- Notable credit(s): St. Paul Pioneer Press columnist, co-host of The Al Franken Show, author of Leap Days: Chronicles of a Midlife Move

Katherine Lanpher (born 1959) is an American writer, journalist, broadcaster, and podcaster, who came to national prominence as the co-host of the Air America Radio program The Al Franken Show in 2004 and 2005.

== Early life and education ==
Katherine Lanpher was born in 1959. Lanpher graduated with a degree in journalism from Northwestern University and with a master's degree in American Cultural History from the University of Chicago.

== Career ==
Lanpher started her career with internships at the Muskegon Chronicle, the Detroit Free Press and the Chicago Sun-Times. Lanpher worked for the St. Paul Pioneer Press for sixteen years (the last six as a columnist), then left to host Minnesota Public Radio's Midmorning program from August 1998 until January 20, 2004.

Lanpher moved to New York City in 2004 to co-host the Air America Radio flagship program The O'Franken Factor She left the show on October 7, 2005, to write a memoir concerning her move to New York City, where she currently resides. Her memoir is entitled Leap Days: Chronicles of a Midlife Move (ISBN 0821258303) and was published on October 10, 2006, by Springboard Press.

On January 4, 2007, More magazine announced that Lanpher would host an hour-long weekly broadcast on XM Satellite Radio called More Time; it debuted January 16 on XM's "Take Five" channel. The announcement said the broadcast would "celebrate the lifestyles of 40+ women with coverage of real women, health, fashion, beauty, travel, entertainment and more. The show ended on or before XM's merger with Sirius Radio.

Since July 2008, Lanpher has been a contributor to WNYC's The Takeaway.

=== Podcasts ===
Since 2006, Lanpher has hosted the monthly "Upstairs at the Square" for Barnes & Noble, currently available as a podcast and since March 2008 as part of the Barnes & Noble Studio. In 2009, Lanpher became the host of TIME Financial Toolkit, a Time magazine podcast in which she talks to "TIME business and economics reporters to sort through the headlines, forecasts, news and numbers."
