= Rush Limbaugh Is a Big Fat Idiot and Other Observations =

Satirical book on American politics by Al Franken

- First edition
- Author: Al Franken
- Language: English
- Subject: American politics
- Genre: American liberalism
- Publisher: Delacorte Press
- Publication date: 1996
- Publication place: United States
- Pages: 271
- ISBN: 0-385-31474-4
- OCLC: 33359983
- Dewey Decimal: 973.929/0207 20
- LC Class: E885 .F73 1996
- Followed by: Lies and the Lying Liars Who Tell Them: A Fair and Balanced Look at the Right

Rush Limbaugh Is a Big Fat Idiot and Other Observations (ISBN 0-385-31474-4) is a 1996 American book by Al Franken. It is satirically critical of 1990s right-wing political figures such as Pat Buchanan, Bob Dole, Phil Gramm, Newt Gingrich, and particularly radio host Rush Limbaugh. Franken often makes his points through humor, including the use of graphs with his handwriting superimposed over them.

The book ranked #1 on the New York Times Best Seller list, February 25, 1996. and sold nearly 1 million copies.

Franken has said that he chose to make the book's title an ad hominem attack as "an ironic comment on the fact that Rush makes ad hominem attacks all the time". Franken cited, for example, Limbaugh's attack on Chelsea Clinton, whom Limbaugh had described as "the White House dog". Franken said his motivation for writing the book was the rise of Newt Gingrich, who used Limbaugh as "his mouthpiece".

The audiobook version won the 1997 Grammy Award for Best Spoken Comedy Album.
