= Al Franken =

American comedian and politician (born 1951)

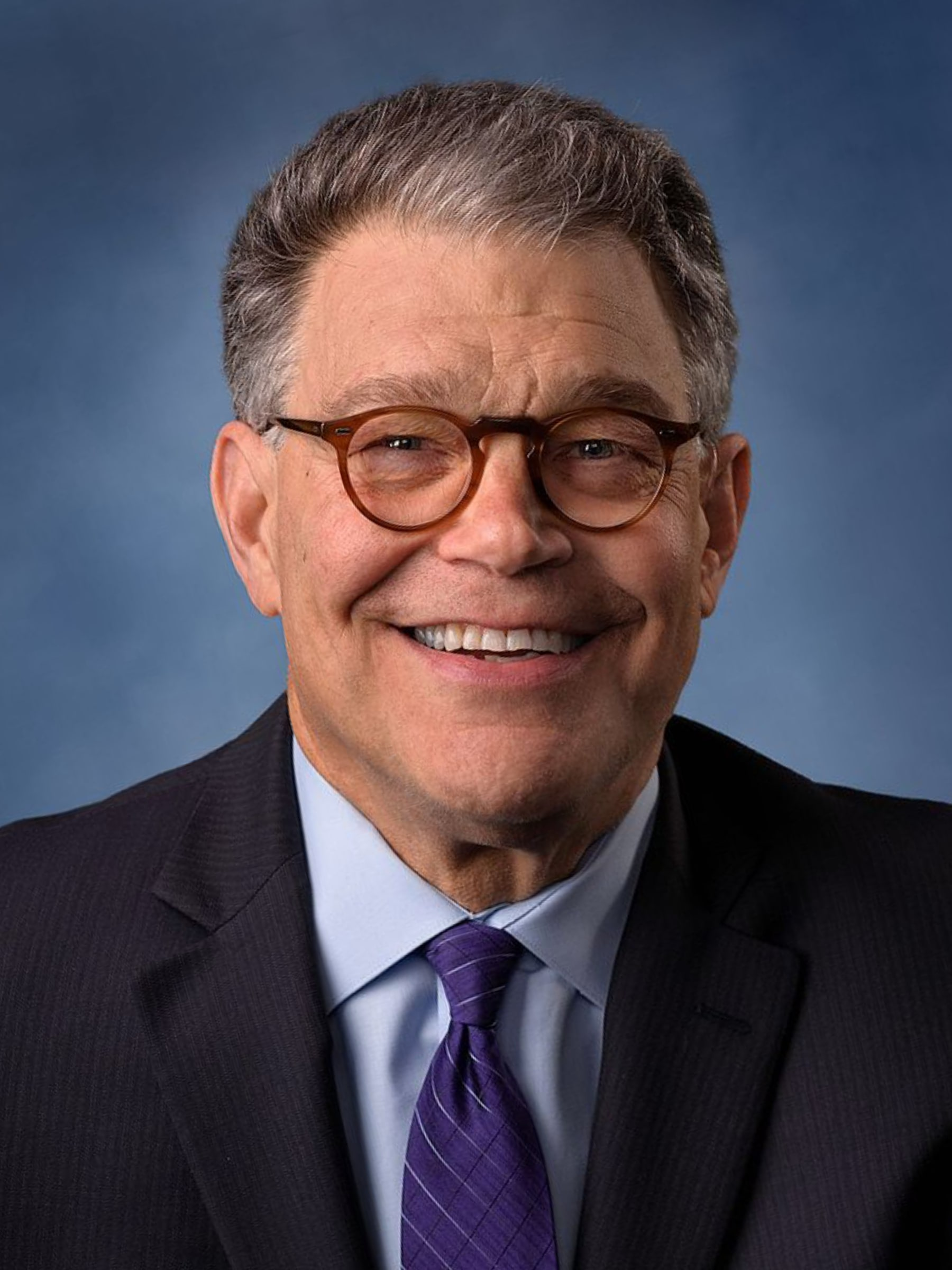
- Official portrait, 2015

United States Senator from Minnesota
- In office July 7, 2009 – January 2, 2018 (Note: Franken was elected to the term beginning January 3, 2009, but did not take his seat until July 7, 2009, because of a recount and a subsequent election challenge.)
- Preceded by: Norm Coleman
- Succeeded by: Tina Smith

Personal details
- Born: Alan Stuart Franken; May 21, 1951 (age 75) New York City, New York, U.S.
- Party: Democratic (DFL)
- Spouse: Franni Bryson (m. 1975)
- Children: 2
- Education: Harvard University (BA)
- Franken's voice Franken reading "Operation Chickenhawk", a chapter from his book Rush Limbaugh Is a Big Fat Idiot and Other Observations.

Alan Stuart Franken (born May 21, 1951) is an American politician, comedian, screenwriter, and actor who served from 2009 until his resignation in 2018 as a United States senator from Minnesota. A member of the Democratic Party, he worked as an entertainer before entering politics, appearing on television and in film.

Franken gained fame as a writer and performer on the NBC sketch comedy series Saturday Night Live. He first worked on the series as a writer from 1975 to 1980, and returned from 1985 to 1995 as a writer and, briefly, a cast member. Afterward, Franken became a liberal political activist, hosting a radio show and writing satirical books scrutinizing the American right.

Though initially dismissed as a novelty candidate due to his background in comedy, Franken was elected to the United States Senate in 2008, defeating incumbent Republican Senator Norm Coleman by 312 votes out of nearly three million cast (a margin of just over 0.01%) in one of the closest elections in Senate history. Franken was reelected in 2014 with 53.2% of the vote. In January 2018, he resigned after allegations of sexual misconduct were made against him. He later said he regrets that decision.

In September 2019, Franken announced he would be hosting The Al Franken Show on Saturday mornings on SiriusXM radio. It covers global affairs, politics, and entertainment.

== Early life and education ==
Franken was born in New York City to Joseph Philip Franken, a printing salesman, and Phoebe Geraldine Franken (née Kunst), a real estate agent. His paternal grandparents emigrated from Germany; his maternal grandfather came from Grodno, Russian Empire; and his maternal grandmother's parents were also from the Russian Empire. Phoebe was from Allentown, Pennsylvania. Both of his parents were Jews, and Franken was raised in a Reform Jewish home and attended Temple Israel in Minneapolis. He has an older brother, Owen (b. circa 1946), who is a photojournalist, and his cousin Bob is a journalist for MSNBC.

The Frankens moved to Albert Lea, Minnesota, when Al was four years old. His father opened a quilting factory, but it failed after two years. The family then moved to St. Louis Park, Minnesota, a suburb of Minneapolis. Franken graduated from The Blake School in 1969, where he was a member of the wrestling team. He attended Harvard College, where he majored in political science, graduating cum laude with a Bachelor of Arts in 1973. As a student, Franken wrote comedy and idolized comedians Dick Gregory and Lenny Bruce because they did acts about hypocrisy and corruption while making the audience laugh.

Franken began performing in high school, where he and his longtime friend and writing partner Tom Davis were known for their comedy. The duo first performed on stage at Minneapolis's Brave New Workshop theater specializing in political satire. They soon found themselves in what was described as "a life of near-total failure on the fringes of show business in Los Angeles".

== Saturday Night Live ==
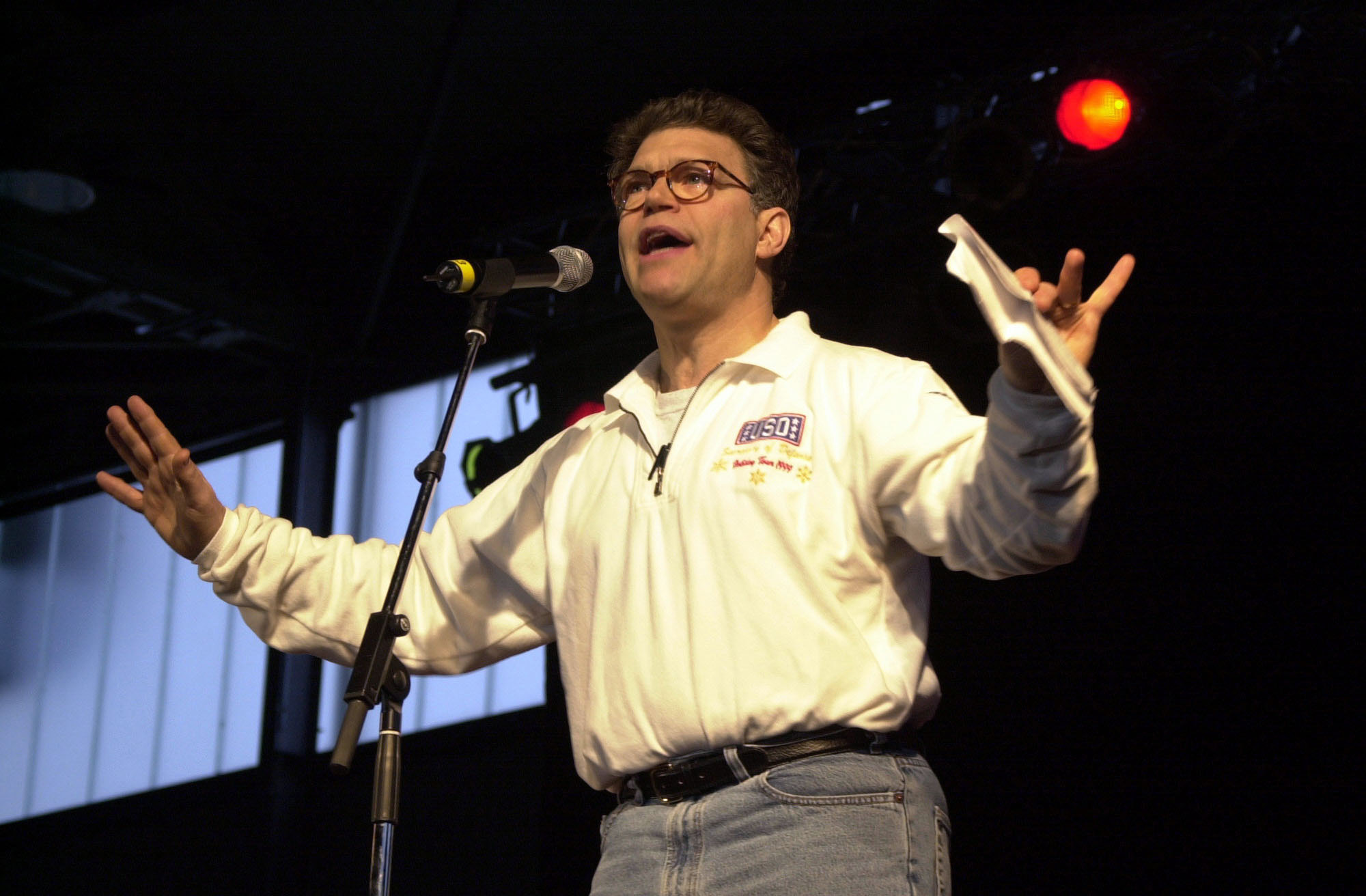
Franken entertaining troops at Ramstein Air Base in December 2000

Franken and Tom Davis were recruited as two of the original writers and occasional performers on Saturday Night Live (SNL) (1975–1980, 1985–1995). In SNL's first season, the two apprentice writers shared a salary of $350 per week. Franken received 15 Emmy nominations and five Emmy awards for his television writing and producing, while creating such characters as self-help guru Stuart Smalley. Another routine proclaimed the 1980s the Al Franken Decade. Franken and Davis wrote the script of the 1986 comedy film One More Saturday Night, appearing in it as rock singers in a band called Bad Mouth. They also had minor roles in All You Need Is Cash and the film Trading Places, starring Eddie Murphy and Dan Aykroyd. In the early 80s, Franken, Davis, and Jim Downey wrote a feature film parody of 1984 called 1985 for Lorne Michaels to produce under his deal with MGM, but the movie was deemed too expensive and never produced.

On Weekend Update near the end of season 5, Franken delivered a commentary called "A Limo for a Lame-O". He mocked controversial NBC president Fred Silverman as "a total unequivocal failure" and displayed a chart showing the poor ratings of NBC programs. As a result of this sketch, Silverman declined Lorne Michaels's recommendation for Franken to succeed him as the producer, and Franken left the show when Michaels did, at the end of the 1979–1980 season. Franken returned to the show in 1985 as a writer and occasional performer. He has acknowledged using cocaine and other illegal drugs while working in television and stated that he stopped after John Belushi died of an overdose. In 1995, Franken left the show in protest over losing the role of Weekend Update anchor to Norm Macdonald.

During an interview on the Howard Stern Show, comedian and actor Dan Aykroyd confirmed that Franken wrote the famous line "Jane, you ignorant slut" from the Point/Counterpoint segment during Aykroyd's tenure at SNL.

In 1995, Franken wrote and starred in the film Stuart Saves His Family, which was based on his SNL character Stuart Smalley. The film was a critical and commercial failure and Franken became depressed as a result. Despite its aggregate rating of 30% on Rotten Tomatoes, the film received favorable reviews from The Washington Post and Gene Siskel.

== Post-SNL activities ==
Franken is the author of four books that made The New York Times Best Seller list. His 1996 book Rush Limbaugh Is a Big Fat Idiot and Other Observations topped the New York Times list; the audiobook, which was read by Franken, won a Grammy Award. Another Grammy was awarded for Franken's 2003 Lies and the Lying Liars Who Tell Them: A Fair and Balanced Look at the Right, a satirical book on American politics and conservatism. The book's title incorporated the Fox News slogan "Fair and Balanced", and had a cover photo of Fox News commentator Bill O'Reilly; that August, Fox News sued claiming infringement of its registered trademark phrase. A federal judge found the lawsuit "wholly without merit". The incident focused media attention on Franken's book and, according to him, greatly increased its sales. The publicity resulting from the lawsuit propelled Franken's yet-to-be-released book to number 1 on Amazon.com.

Franken signed a one-year contract in early 2004 to host a talk show for Air America Radio's flagship program with co-host Katherine Lanpher, who remained with the show until October 2005. The network was launched on March 31, 2004. Originally named The O'Franken Factor as a pun on right-wing talk show The O'Reilly Factor, but later renamed The Al Franken Show on July 12, 2004, the show aired three hours a day, five days a week for three years. Its stated goal was to put more progressive views on the public airwaves to counter what Franken perceived as the dominance of conservative syndicated commentary on the radio: "I'm doing this because I want to use my energies to get Bush unelected", he told a New York Times reporter in 2004. Franken's last radio show on Air America Radio was on February 14, 2007, at the end of which he announced his candidacy for the United States Senate.

Franken also co-wrote the film When a Man Loves a Woman, co-created and starred in the NBC sitcom LateLine, and appeared in the 2004 remake of The Manchurian Candidate.

In 2003, Franken served as a Fellow at Harvard Kennedy School's Joan Shorenstein Center on the Press, Politics and Public Policy. Since 2005 he has been a contributor to The Huffington Post.

Franken toured Iraq several times with the United Service Organizations (USO). On March 25, 2009, he was presented with the USO Metro Merit Award for his ten years of involvement with the organization.

== Political activism ==
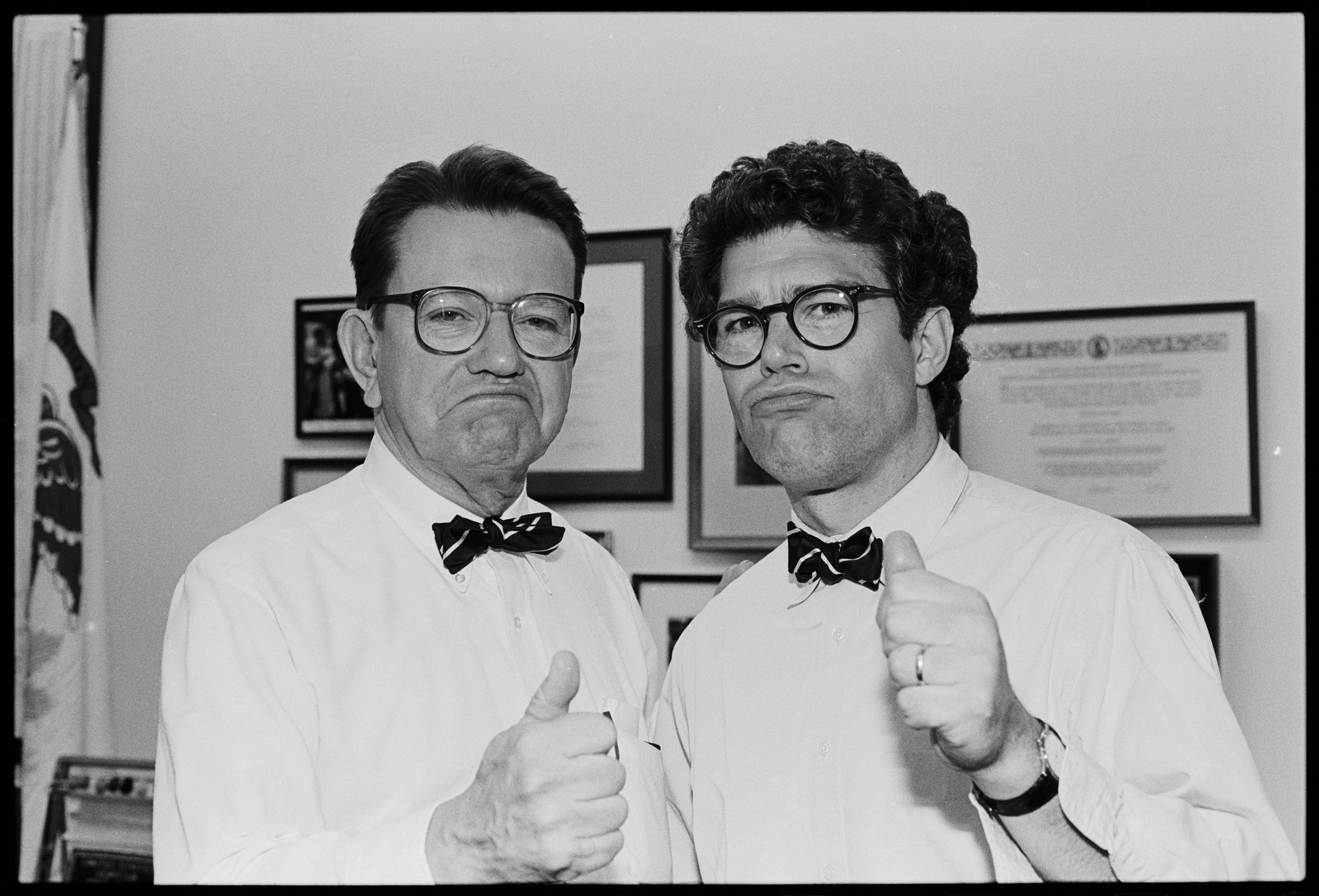
Franken with Senator Paul Simon in 1991

According to an article by Richard Corliss published in Time magazine, "In a way, Franken has been running for office since the late '70s." Corliss also hinted at Franken's "possibly ironic role as a relentless self-promoter" in proclaiming the 1980s "The Al Franken Decade" and saying, "Vote for me, Al Franken. You'll be glad you did!" In 1999 Franken released a parody book, Why Not Me?, detailing his hypothetical campaign for president in 2000. He had been a strong supporter of Minnesota Senator Paul Wellstone, who died in a plane crash shortly before the 2002 election. Wellstone was a mentor and political and personal role model for Franken, who stated his hopes of following in Wellstone's footsteps. Senator Norm Coleman's comment that he was a "99 percent improvement" over Wellstone was an impetus for Franken's run for the Senate.

Franken said he learned that 21% of Americans received most of their news from talk radio, an almost exclusively conservative medium. "I didn't want to sit on the sidelines, and I believed Air America could make a difference", he said. In November 2003 Franken talked about moving back to his home state of Minnesota to run for the Senate. At the time the seat once held by Wellstone was occupied by Republican Norm Coleman. At a 2004 Democratic presidential campaign event, Franken tackled a man who was allegedly threatening other attendees and heckling Governor Howard Dean. In 2005 Franken announced his move to Minnesota: "I can tell you honestly, I don't know if I'm going to run, but I'm doing the stuff I need to do in order to do it." In late 2005 he started his own political action committee, Midwest Values PAC. By early 2007 the PAC had raised more than $1 million.

Franken was the subject of the 2006 documentary film Al Franken: God Spoke, which The New York Times called "an investigation of the phenomenon of ideological celebrity".

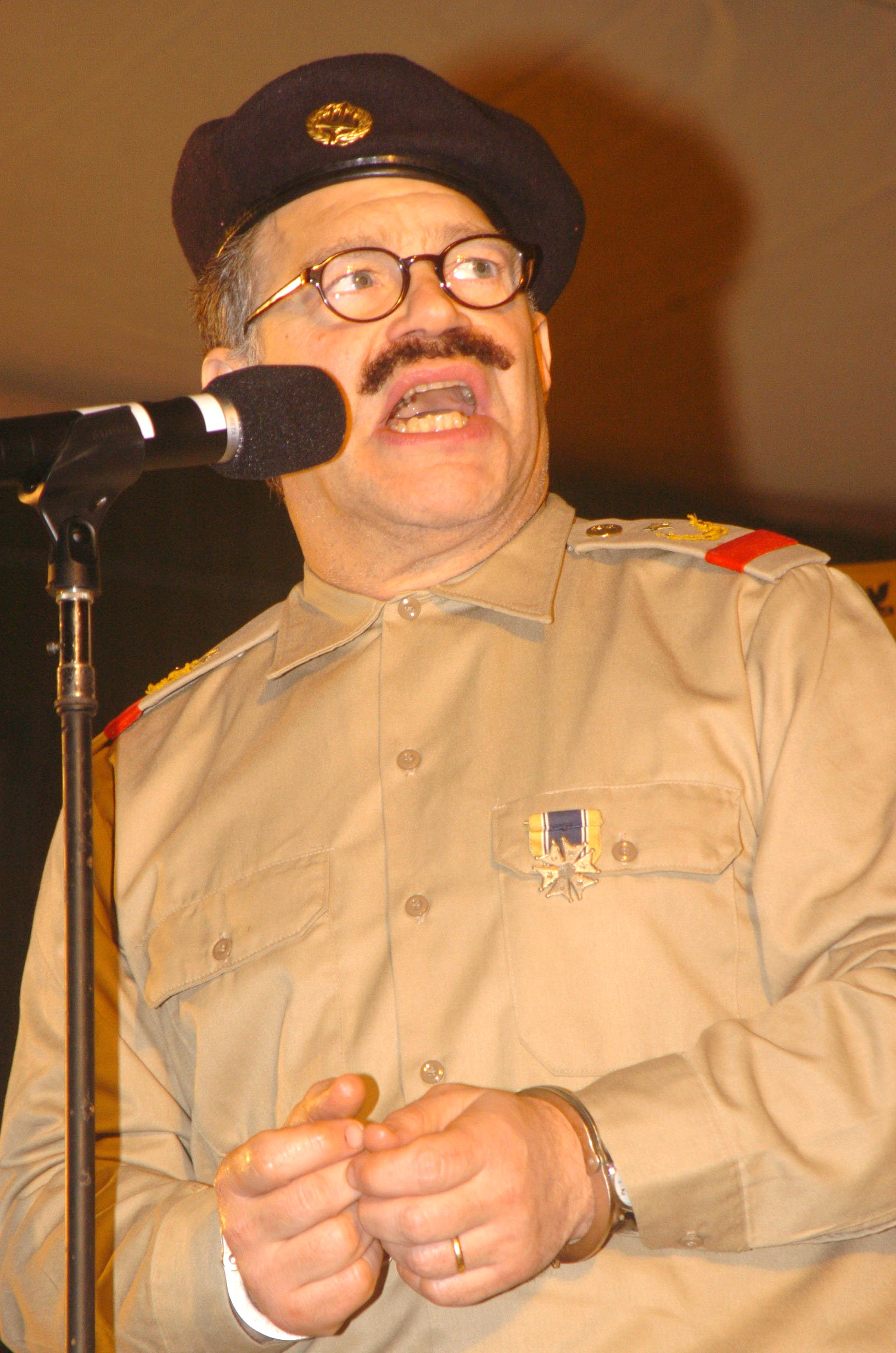
Franken playing Saddam Hussein while entertaining service members in Iraq (2005)

Franken initially supported the Iraq War, but opposed the 2007 troop surge. In an interview with MSNBC's Joe Scarborough, he said that he "believed Colin Powell", whose presentation at the United Nations convinced him that the war was necessary, but had since come to believe that "we were misled into the war" and urged the Democratic-controlled Congress to refuse to pass appropriations bills to fund the war if they did not include timetables for leaving Iraq. In an interview with Josh Marshall, Franken said of the Democrats, "I think we've gotta make President George W. Bush say, 'OK, I'm cutting off funding because I won't agree to a timetable.'"

In 2004, Franken favored transitioning to a universal health care system, with the provision that every child in America would receive health care coverage immediately. In 2014, he objected to efforts to privatize Social Security or cut benefits, favoring raising the cap on wages to which Social Security taxes apply. On his 2008 campaign website, he voiced support for cutting subsidies for oil companies, increasing money available for college students, and cutting interest rates on student loans.

During the 2008 election, New York state officials asserted that Al Franken Inc. had failed to carry required workers' compensation insurance for employees who assisted him with his comedy and public speaking from 2002 to 2005. Franken paid a $25,000 fine to the state of New York upon being advised his corporation was out of compliance with the state's workers' compensation laws. At the same time, the California Franchise Tax Board reported that the same corporation owed more than $4,743 in taxes, fines, and associated penalties in the state of California for 2003 through 2007, because the corporation did not file tax returns in the state for those years. A Franken representative said that it followed the advice of an accountant who believed when the corporation stopped doing business in California that no further filing was required. Franken subsequently paid $70,000 in back income taxes in 17 states dating back to 2003, mostly from his speeches and other paid appearances. Franken said he paid the income tax in his state of residence, and he would seek retroactive credit for paying the taxes in the wrong state.

== U.S. Senate ==
=== Elections ===
==== 2008 election ====
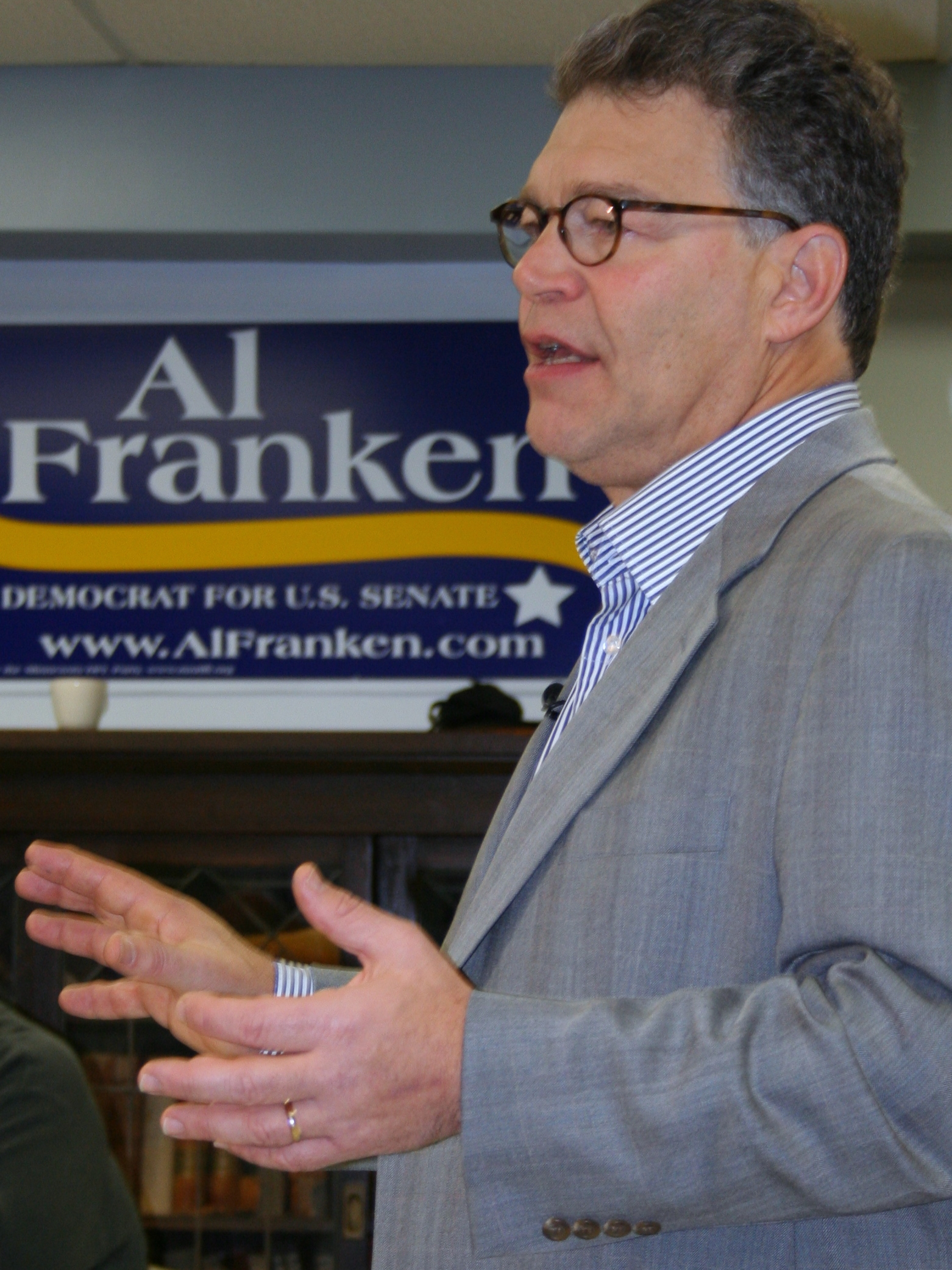
Franken campaigning for the U.S. Senate in 2008

On January 29, 2007, Franken announced his departure from Air America Radio, and on the day of his final show, February 14, he formally announced his candidacy for the United States Senate from Minnesota in 2008. Challenging him for the Democratic–Farmer–Labor Party endorsement was Jack Nelson-Pallmeyer, a professor, author, and activist; trial lawyer Mike Ciresi; and attorney and human rights activist Jim Cohen, who dropped out of the race early. Franken won the nomination with 65% of the vote.

On July 8, 2007, Franken's campaign stated that it expected to announce that he had raised more money than his Republican opponent, Norm Coleman, during the second quarter of the year, taking in $1.9 million to Coleman's $1.6 million, although in early July 2007, Coleman's $3.8 million cash on hand exceeded Franken's $2 million.

In May 2008, the Minnesota Republican Party released a letter about an article Franken had written for Playboy magazine in 2000 titled "Porn-O-Rama!" The letter, signed by six prominent GOP women, including a state senator and state representative, called on Franken to apologize for what they called a "demeaning and degrading" article. His campaign spokesman responded, "Al had a long career as a satirist. But he understands the difference between what you say as a satirist and what you do as a senator. And as a Senator, Norm Coleman has disrespected the people of Minnesota by putting the Exxons and Halliburtons ahead of working families. And there's nothing funny about that."

On June 7, 2008, Franken was endorsed by the DFL. In a July 2008 interview with CNN, he was endorsed by Ben Stein, an entertainer, speechwriter, lawyer and author known for his conservative views, who generally supported Republican candidates. Stein said of Franken, "He is my pal, and he is a really, really capable smart guy. I don't agree with all of his positions, but he is a very impressive guy, and I think he should be in the Senate."

During his campaign, Franken was criticized for advising SNL creator Lorne Michaels on a political sketch ridiculing Senator John McCain's ads attacking Barack Obama in the 2008 presidential election. Coleman's campaign reacted, saying, "Once again, he proves he's more interested in entertainment than service, and ridiculing those with whom he disagrees."

Preliminary reports on election night, November 4, were that Coleman was leading by over 700 votes, but the official results, certified on November 18, 2008, had Coleman leading by only 215 votes. Because the two candidates were separated by less than 0.5 percent of the votes cast, the Minnesota Secretary of State, Mark Ritchie authorized the automatic recount provided for in Minnesota election law. In the recount, ballots and certifying materials were examined by hand, and candidates could file challenges to the legality of ballots or materials for inclusion or exclusion. On January 5, 2009, the Minnesota State Canvassing Board certified the recounted vote totals, with Franken ahead by 225 votes.

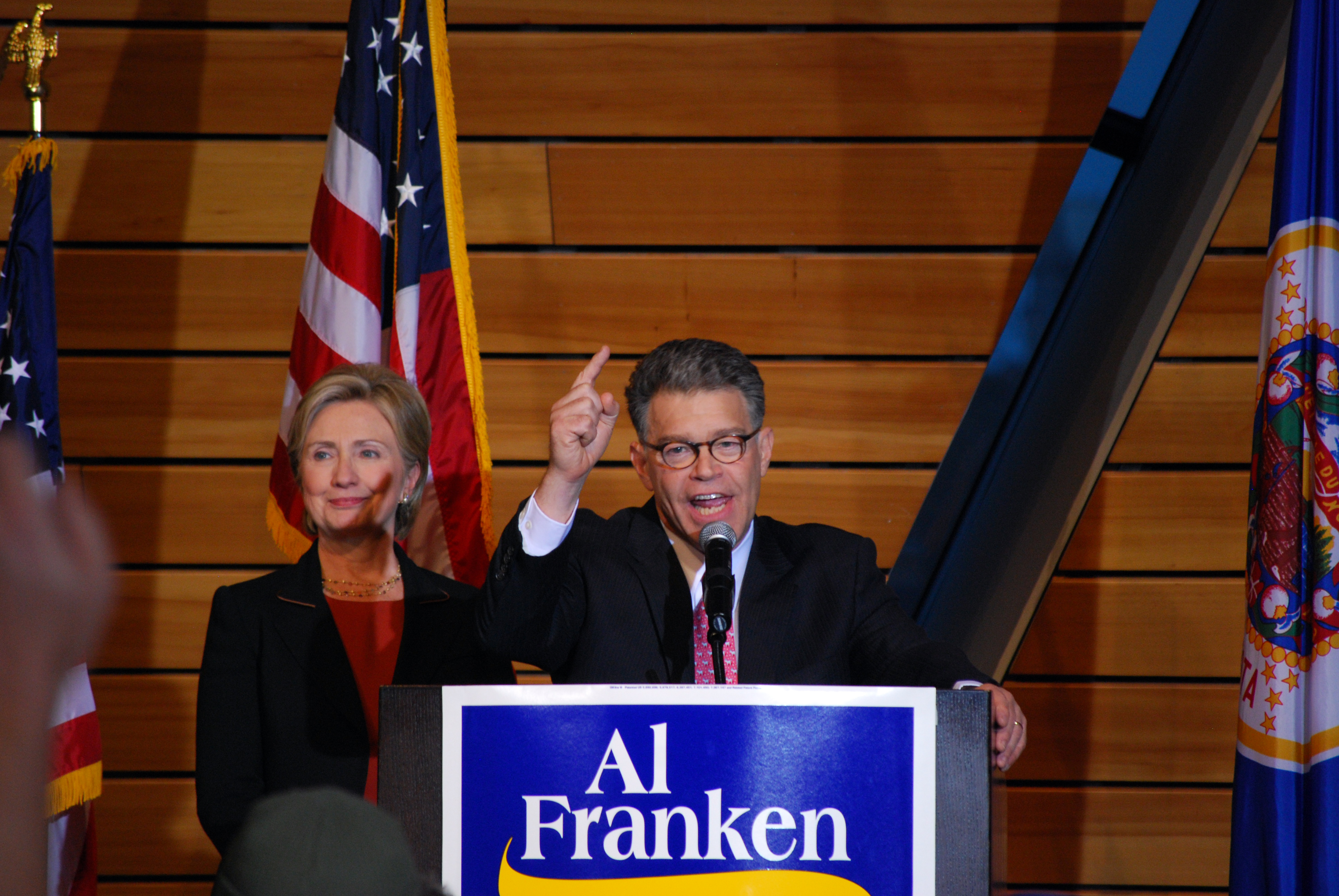
Franken at an election rally with Hillary Clinton in October 2008

On January 6, 2009, Coleman's campaign filed an election contest which led to a trial before a three-judge panel. The trial ended on April 7, when the panel ruled that 351 of 387 disputed absentee ballots were incorrectly rejected and ordered them counted. Counting those ballots raised Franken's lead to 312 votes. Coleman appealed to the Minnesota Supreme Court on April 20. On April 24 the Minnesota Supreme Court agreed to hear the case. Oral arguments were conducted on June 1.

On June 30, 2009, the Minnesota Supreme Court unanimously rejected Coleman's appeal and said that Franken was entitled to be certified as the winner. Shortly after the court's decision, Coleman conceded. Governor Tim Pawlenty signed Franken's election certificate that evening.

==== 2014 election ====
Franken was reelected to a second term in 2014. He won the August 12 primary election, in which he was challenged by Sandra Henningsgard, with 94.5% of the vote. He won the general election against the Republican nominee, Mike McFadden with 53.2% of the vote.

=== Tenure ===
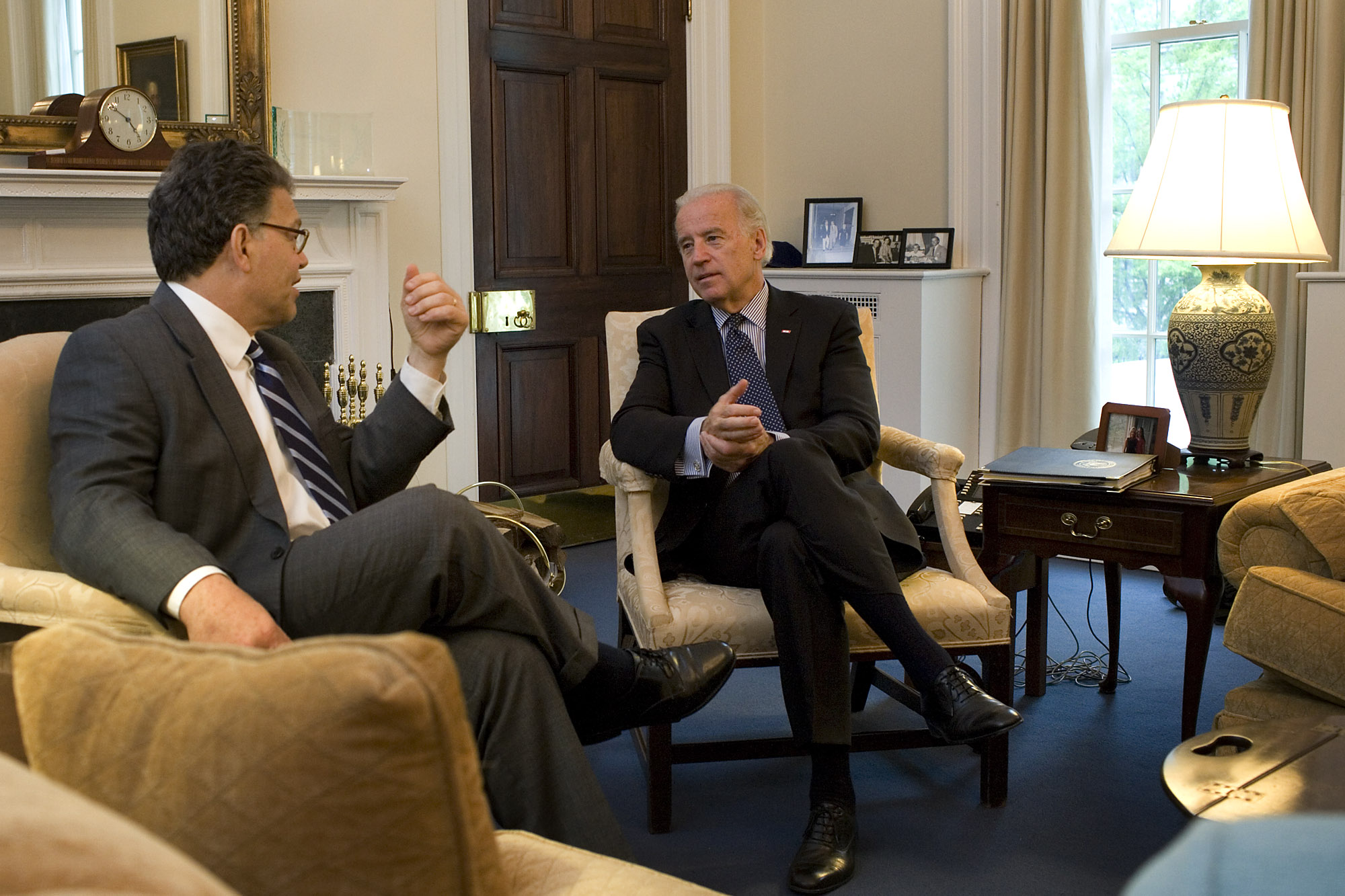
Franken meeting with Vice President Joe Biden in May 2009

Franken was sworn into the Senate on July 7, 2009, 246 days after the election. He took the oath of office with the Bible of late Minnesota Senator Paul Wellstone, whose old seat Senate leaders set aside for Franken.

On August 6, 2009, Franken presided over the confirmation vote of Sonia Sotomayor to be an Associate Justice of the United States Supreme Court. On August 5, 2010, Franken presided over the confirmation vote of Elena Kagan. His first piece of legislation, the Service Dogs for Veterans Act, which he wrote jointly with Republican Senator Johnny Isakson, passed the Senate by unanimous consent. It established a program with the United States Department of Veterans Affairs to pair disabled veterans with service dogs.

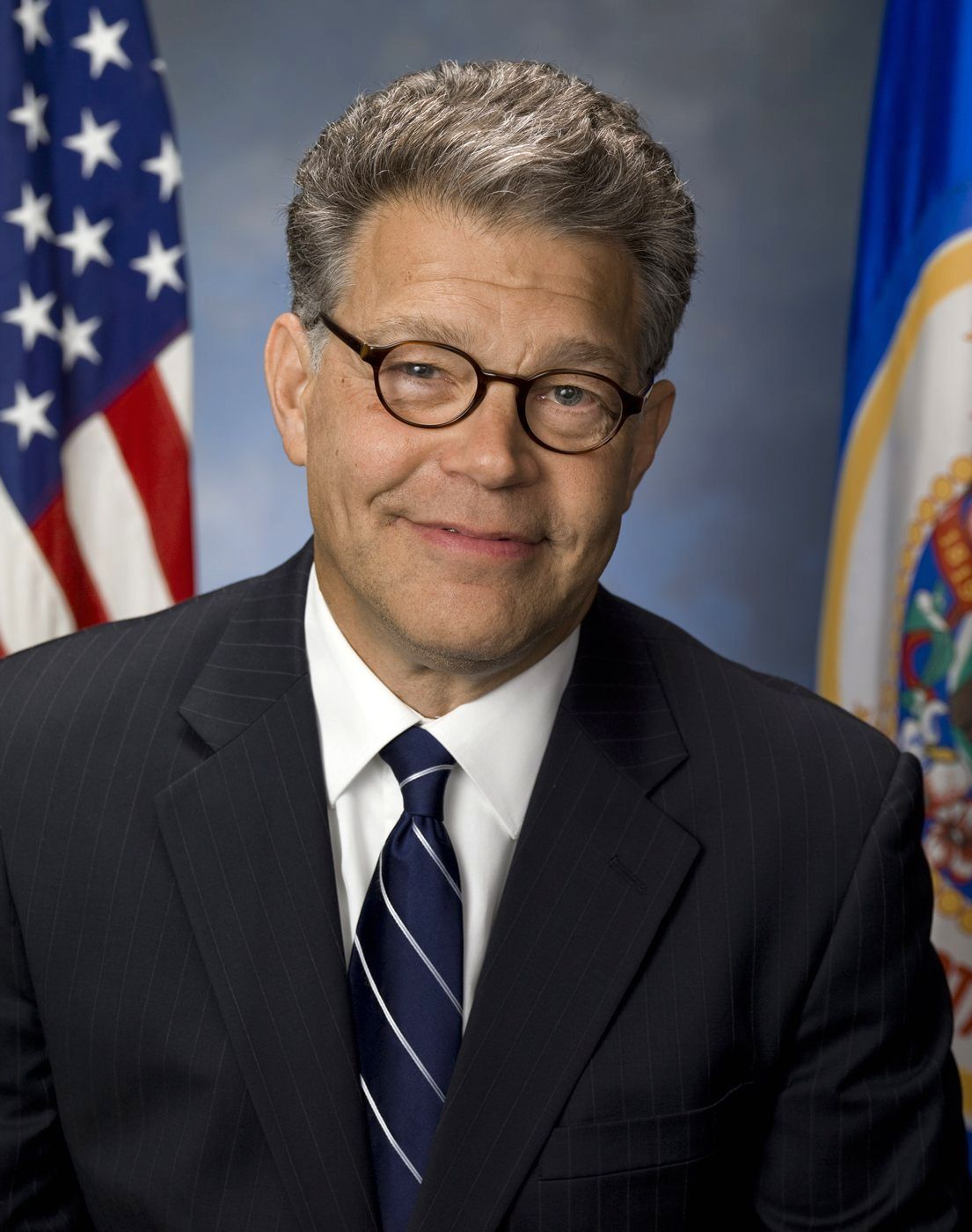
Franken during the 111th Congress

A video of Franken at the Minnesota State Fair on September 2, 2009, engaging in a discussion with a group of Tea Party protesters on health care reform, began circulating on the Internet and soon went viral. The discussion was noted for its civility, in contrast to the explosive character of several other discussions between members of the 111th Congress and their constituents that had occurred over the summer.

During the debate on health care reform, Franken was one of the strongest supporters of a single-payer system. He authored an amendment to the Patient Protection and Affordable Care Act called the Medical Loss Ratio, which required that insurance companies spend at least 80% of premiums on actual health care costs, and 85% for large group plans. On September 30, 2013, Franken voted to remove a provision that would repeal Obamacare's medical device tax from a government funding bill, saying that though he supported the provision, he disagreed with its being used as a condition for preventing the 2013 federal government shutdown.

Citing the case of Jamie Leigh Jones, Franken introduced a limit to the arbitration policy of the 2010 Defense Appropriations bill that withheld defense contracts from companies that restrict their employees from taking workplace sexual assault, battery, and discrimination cases to court. It passed the Senate in November 2010, 68 to 30, in a roll-call vote.

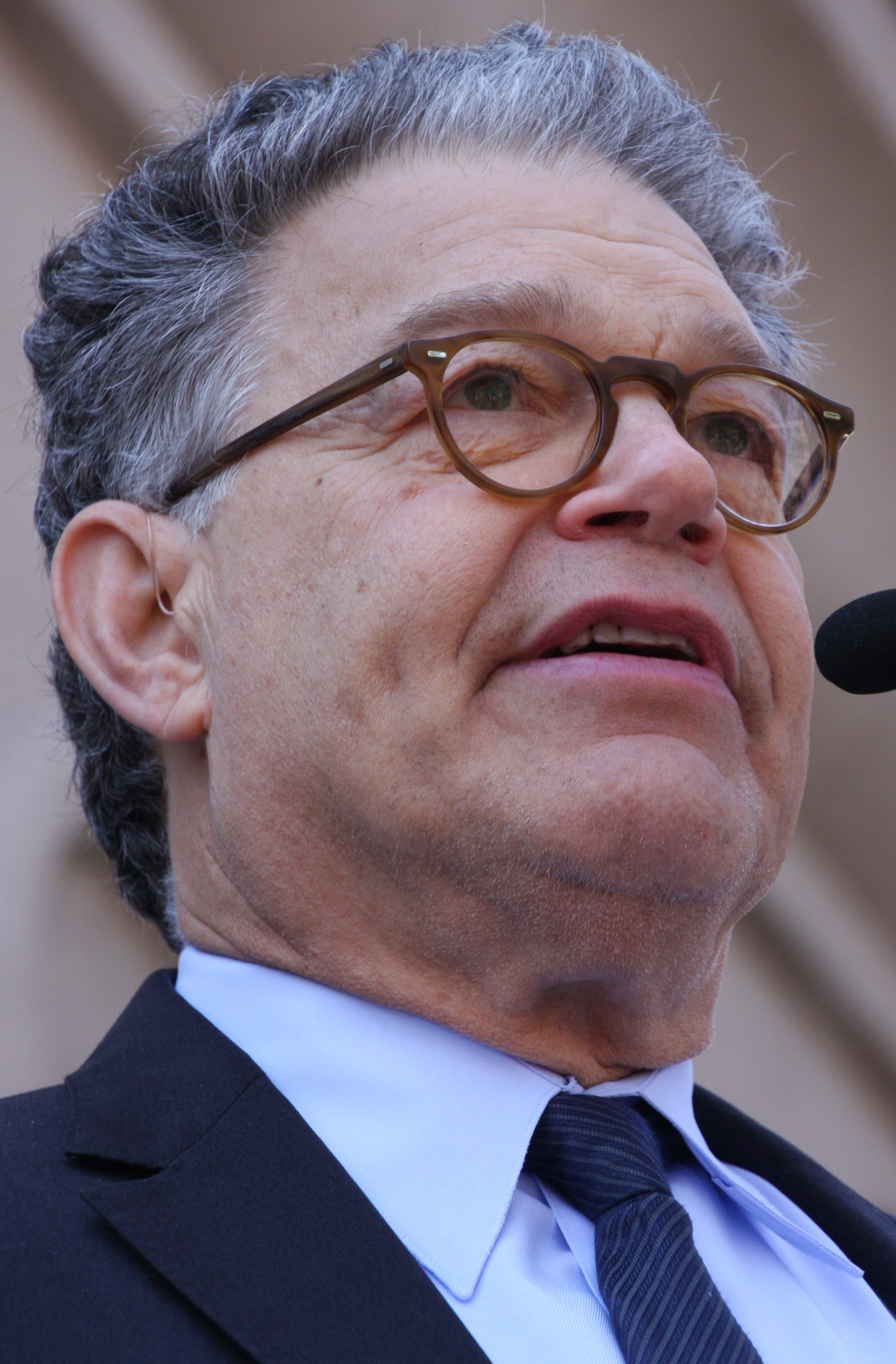
Franken in 2017

In May 2010, Franken proposed a financial-reform amendment that created a board to select which credit rating agency would evaluate a given security. At the time, any company issuing a security could select the company that evaluated the security. The amendment passed, but the financial industry lobbied to have it removed from the final bill. Negotiations between the Senate and House, whose version of financial reform did not include such a provision, resulted in the amendment's being watered down to require only a series of studies being done on the issue for two years. After the studies, if the Securities and Exchange Commission had not implemented another solution to the conflict-of-interest problem, Franken's solution would go into effect.

In August 2010, Franken made faces and hand gestures and rolled his eyes while Senate Minority Leader Mitch McConnell delivered a speech in opposition to the confirmation of Elena Kagan to the U.S. Supreme Court. McConnell responded, "This isn't Saturday Night Live, Al." After Kagan's confirmation, Franken delivered a handwritten apology to McConnell and issued a public statement saying that McConnell had a right "to give his speech with the presiding officer just listening respectfully".

The National Journal reported in 2013 that Franken supported the National Security Agency's data mining programs, believing they had saved lives, and that "I can assure you, this is not about spying on the American people."

In 2013, Franken received the Stewart B. McKinney Award for his work fighting homelessness.

When Franken declared his intention to seek reelection in 2014, his seat was thought to be a top target for the Republicans because of his very slim margin of victory in 2008. But Politico reported that his high approval rating, his large campaign fund, and the Republicans' struggle to find a top-tier candidate meant he was a "heavy favorite" to win reelection, and Franken won the race comfortably.

In 2015, during Loretta Lynch's confirmation hearings, Franken asked her about the Computer Fraud and Abuse Act, reiterating concern for the aggressive prosecution of Aaron Swartz in United States v. Swartz.

The Associated Press noted in 2013 that, contrary to expectations, Franken did not seek out the media spotlight: "He rarely talks to the Washington press corps, has shed his comedic persona and focused on policy, working to be taken seriously." In interviews he expressed his desire to be known for a focus on constituency work, keeping his head down, and working hard.

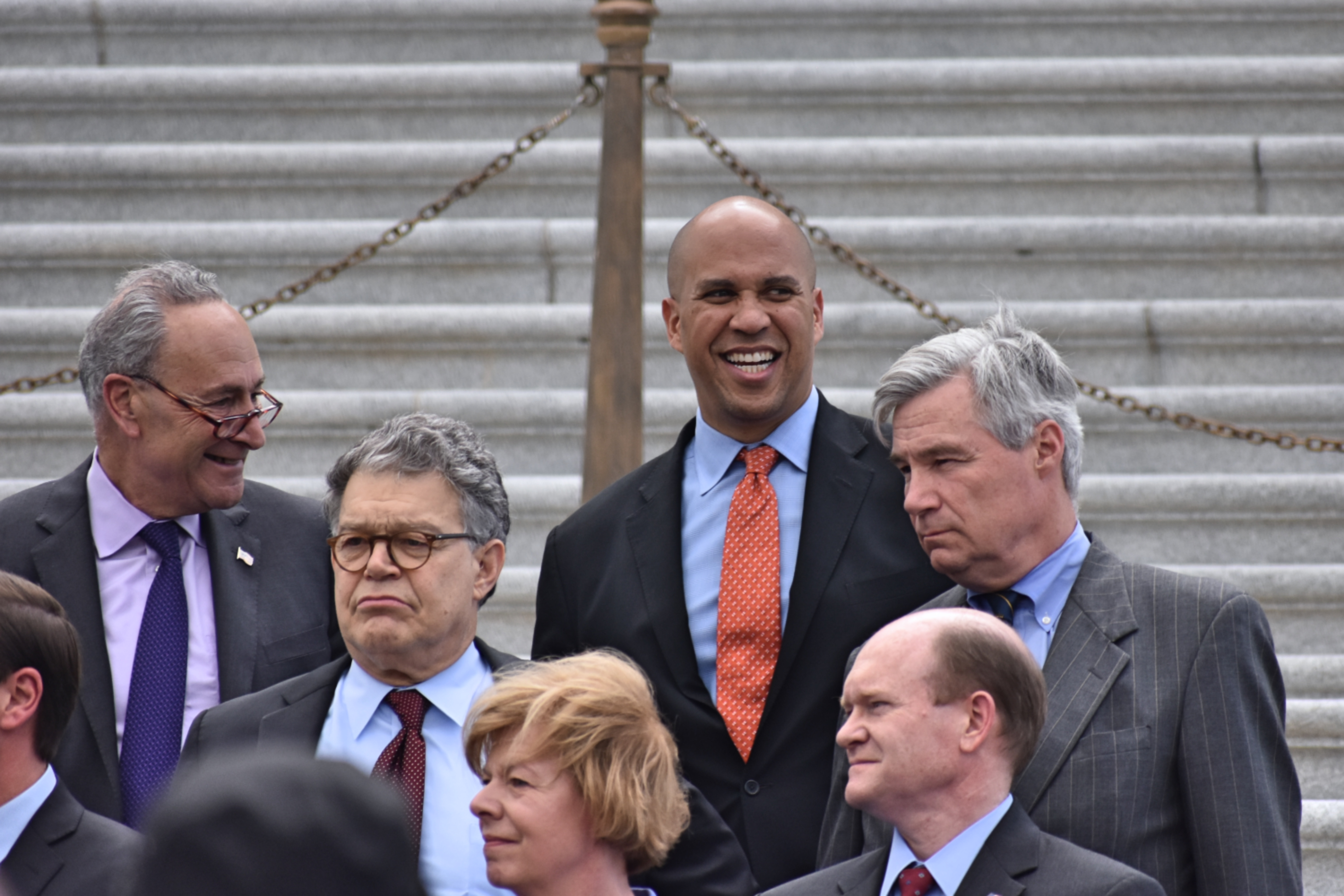
Franken in July 2017 (second from the left)

Franken was an effective fundraiser for the Democrats. By late 2015, his political action committee had raised more than $5 million in donations. In 2016, his PAC raised $3.3 million. According to The Star Tribune, Franken was able to "draw crowds and donations across the country".

Franken condemned the genocide of the Rohingya Muslim minority in Myanmar and called for a stronger response to the crisis.

In September 2016, in advance of UN Security Council resolution 2334 condemning Israeli settlements in the occupied Palestinian territories, Franken signed an AIPAC-sponsored letter urging Obama to veto "one-sided" resolutions against Israel. Franken supported an Anti-Boycott Act, which would make it legal for U.S. states to refuse to do business with contractors that engage in boycotts against Israel.

In July 2017 Franken voted in favor of the Countering America's Adversaries Through Sanctions Act that placed sanctions on Iran, Russia, and North Korea.

=== Sexual misconduct allegations ===
On November 16, 2017, radio broadcaster and model Leeann Tweeden alleged in a blog post and an interview with her radio station, 790 KABC, that Franken kissed her on a 2006 USO tour during a rehearsal for a skit. She wrote, "I said 'OK' so he would stop badgering me. We did the line leading up to the kiss and then he came at me, put his hand on the back of my head, mashed his lips against mine and aggressively stuck his tongue in my mouth." She said she pushed him away, feeling "disgusted and violated". Roger Stone circulated news of the allegations to right-wing media.

Franken holding his hands above Leeann Tweeden's breasts in 2006

During the 2006 tour, Franken was photographed holding his hands above Tweeden's breasts while she was asleep wearing body armor and a helmet. In Franken's defense, CNBC's John Harwood said, "That pic was obviously a joke, not groping, just like LeeAnn Tweeden wrapping her leg around Robin Williams and smacking his butt; entertainment for soldiers deployed overseas is raunchy like that." Harwood was referring to video taken of Tweeden "humping" the married Williams on a similar 2004 USO tour.

In response, Franken said, "I certainly don't remember the rehearsal for the skit in the same way, but I send my sincerest apologies to Leeann.... As to the photo, it was clearly intended to be funny but wasn't. I shouldn't have done it." A few hours later, Franken issued a longer apology, which Tweeden accepted.

In the days that followed, seven additional women came forward with allegations of inappropriate behavior during photo ops. Lindsay Menz accused Franken of touching her clothed "upper" buttocks while they posed for a photo at the Minnesota State Fair in 2010. Two anonymous women made similar complaints related to events during political events. Franken apologized, saying, "I've met tens of thousands of people and taken thousands of photographs, often in crowded and chaotic situations. I'm a warm person; I hug people. I've learned from recent stories that in some of those encounters, I crossed a line for some women—and I know that any number is too many." Another anonymous woman said that after she was a guest on Franken's radio show in 2006, Franken leaned in toward her face during a handshake and gave her "a wet, open-mouthed kiss" on the cheek when she turned her face aside. The same day, Stephanie Kemplin, an army veteran, told CNN that Franken held the side of her breast for 5 to 10 seconds "and never moved his hand" while posing for a photograph with her during a 2003 USO tour in Iraq.

Senate Majority Leader Mitch McConnell and Minority Leader Chuck Schumer sent Tweeden's accusations to the Senate Ethics Committee for review, a decision supported by members of both parties, including Franken. On November 30 the committee announced that it was investigating allegations against him. Some liberal groups and commentators, including the Indivisible movement and Sally Kohn, called on Franken to resign. On December 6, two more accusations surfaced, one by an anonymous congressional aide about an attempted kiss at his radio show studio, and one by congressional aide Tina Dupuy, who alleged that Franken squeezed her waist at a party before he took office. More than two dozen Democratic senators, led by New York Senator Kirsten Gillibrand, called on Franken to resign before the ethics committee could review the allegations.

==== Resignation ====
Although Franken had asked to be allowed to appear before the Senate Ethics Committee to give his side of the story, on December 6 Senate Minority Leader Chuck Schumer told him he had to announce his resignation by five o'clock or he could be censured and stripped of committee assignments. On December 7, Franken announced his intention to resign his Senate seat. He called some of the accusations "simply not true" and said he remembered others "very differently". In his resignation speech he made comparisons to Republican politicians, saying he was "aware of the irony" that President Trump remained in office despite the comments Trump made in the Access Hollywood tape released a month before his election, and that the Republican Party supported Roy Moore's Senate campaign despite the many allegations of harassment and molestation against Moore. Franken resigned on January 2, 2018, and Minnesota governor Mark Dayton appointed the lieutenant governor, Tina Smith, to Franken's seat until a November 2018 special election, which Smith won.

==== Aftermath ====
After resigning from the Senate, Franken canceled appointments with close friends and ignored phone calls from others. "It got pretty dark, I became clinically depressed. I wasn't a hundred percent cognitively. I needed medication", he said.

Reporting in 2019 by New Yorker journalist Jane Mayer documented substantial inaccuracies in Tweeden's allegations. Seven former or current senators who called for Franken's resignation in 2017 told Mayer they regretted doing so. Patrick Leahy said calling for Franken's resignation without having all the facts was "one of the biggest mistakes I've made" as a senator. New Mexico senator Tom Udall said, "I made a mistake. I started having second thoughts shortly after he stepped down. He had the right to be heard by an independent investigative body. I've heard from people around my state, and around the country, saying that they think he got railroaded. It doesn't seem fair. I'm a lawyer. I really believe in due process." Former Senate Majority Leader Harry Reid said, "It's terrible what happened to him. It was unfair. It took the legs out from under him. He was a very fine senator."

Accusations that Franken was unfairly pressured to resign were described as a liability to Gillibrand's presidential campaign in mid-2019. In a 2018 Politico article, Franken supporters accused Gillibrand of doing damage that Republicans could not have done, given Franken's effectiveness in the Senate. Prominent Democratic fundraiser Susie Tompkins Buell said that the episode "stained [Gillibrand's] reputation as a fair player. I do hear people refer to Kirsten Gillibrand as 'opportunistic' and shrewd at the expense of others to advance herself, and it seems to have been demonstrated in her rapid treatment of her colleague Al Franken. I heard her referred to as 'She would eat her own,' and she seems to have demonstrated that. I know [Gillibrand] thought she was doing the right thing, but I think she will be remembered by this rush to judgment. I have heard [that] some of her women colleagues regret joining her."

In 2019, Franken said that he was sorry that he made some women feel uncomfortable, and that while he was still trying to understand what he did wrong, he felt that differentiating dissimilar kinds of behavior is important. "The idea that anybody who accuses someone of something is always right—that's not the case. That isn't reality," he said.

In September 2019, a ninth accuser told New York magazine that in 2006 Franken touched her buttock in a photo line at an event for Patty Murray. The unnamed woman, described as a "former staffer who served on Democratic campaigns and works at a large progressive organization", said she had not come forward because she feared it would be held against her in her career. In response, Franken told New York, "Two years ago, I would have sworn that I'd never done anything to make anyone feel uncomfortable, but it's clear that I must have been doing something. As I've said before, I feel terrible that anyone came away from an interaction with me feeling bad."

In a February 9, 2022, interview with Washington Post Live, Franken said he regretted resigning from the Senate and might run for public office again.

=== Committee assignments ===
In the Senate, Franken served on the following committees:

- Committee on Energy and Natural Resources
  - Subcommittee on Energy
  - Subcommittee on Public Lands, Forests and Mining
  - Subcommittee on Water and Power
- Committee on Health, Education, Labor, and Pensions
  - Subcommittee on Children and Families
  - Subcommittee on Employment and Workplace Safety (Ranking Member)
- Committee on Indian Affairs
- Committee on the Judiciary
  - Subcommittee on Administrative Oversight and the Courts
  - Subcommittee on Antitrust, Competition Policy and Consumer Rights
  - Subcommittee on the Constitution, Civil Rights and Human Rights
  - Subcommittee on Privacy, Technology, and the Law (Ranking Member)

== Post-Senate career ==
After his resignation, Franken went into a period of self-imposed isolation and, in May 2019, started The Al Franken Podcast. Around the same time, Franken went on tour with a non-comedic show that he did from a podium and with notes. In the fall of 2021, his first post-quarantine theater show took place in Northampton, Massachusetts, in front of a friendly audience. The solo show, called The Only Former US Senator Currently on Tour Tour, continued into 2022. In March 2023, Franken guest-hosted The Daily Show after Trevor Noah's departure. In 2025, in his first acting role in 27 years, Franken plays a U.S. senator in the Netflix comedy mystery The Residence.

== Personal life ==
Franken met his wife, Franni Bryson, during his first year at Harvard. In 2005 they moved to Minneapolis, Minnesota. They have a daughter, a son, and four grandchildren. Their daughter, Thomasin, has degrees from Harvard and the French Culinary Institute; as of 2011 she was the director of extended learning at DC Prep, an organization in Washington, D.C., that manages charter schools. Their son, Joseph, works in the finance industry. Franken is a second cousin of the actor Steve Franken, known for his appearances in the television series The Many Loves of Dobie Gillis.

In the summer of 2021, Franken moved back to New York City, settling on the Upper West Side of Manhattan.

== Bibliography ==
- I'm Good Enough, I'm Smart Enough, and Doggone It, People Like Me!: Daily Affirmations By Stuart Smalley (Random House Publishing Group, 1992) ISBN 9780440504702
- Rush Limbaugh Is a Big Fat Idiot and Other Observations (Delacorte Press, 1996) ISBN 0-385-31474-4
- Why Not Me?: The Inside Story of the Making and Unmaking of the Franken Presidency (Delacorte Press, 1999) ISBN 0-385-31809-X
- Oh, the Things I Know!: A Guide to Success, or Failing That, Happiness (Plume Books, 2003) ISBN 0-452-28450-3
- Lies and the Lying Liars Who Tell Them: A Fair and Balanced Look at the Right (Dutton Books, 2003) ISBN 0-525-94764-7
- The Truth (With Jokes) (Dutton Books, 2005) ISBN 0-525-94906-2
- Al Franken, Giant of the Senate (Grand Central Publishing, 2017) ISBN 1455540412

== Filmography ==
Year	Work	Writer	Actor	Cameo	Notes
1975–1980	Saturday Night Live	Yes	Yes		Writer: 1975–1980; Featured player: 1979–80
1976	Tunnel Vision		Yes		Role: Al
1977	The Paul Simon Special	Yes			
1978	All You Need is Cash		Yes		Role: Extra
1981	Grateful Dead: Dead Ahead	Yes	Yes		Concert video Role: Host
1981	Steve Martin's Best Show Ever	Yes			
1981	Bob and Ray, Jane, Laraine and Gilda	Yes			
1983	The Coneheads	Yes			
1983	Trading Places		Yes		Role: Baggage handler
1984	Franken and Davis at Stockton State	Yes			
1984	The New Show	Yes			
1985–1995	Saturday Night Live	Yes	Yes		Writer: 1985–1995; Producer: 1985–86; Writing Supervisor: 1988–1990; Co-producer: 1990–1992; Featured player: 1988–1995
1986	One More Saturday Night	Yes	Yes		Role: Paul Flum
1993	Coneheads	Yes			
1994	When a Man Loves a Woman	Yes			
1995	Stuart Saves His Family	Yes	Yes		Role: Stuart Smalley
1997	3rd Rock from the Sun		Yes		Episode: "Dick the Vote"
1997	The Larry Sanders Show			Yes	Episode: "The Roast"
1998–1999	LateLine	Yes	Yes	Yes	
1998	From the Earth to the Moon		Yes		TV miniseries Role: Jerome Wiesner
2001	Harvard Man			Yes	
2004	Outfoxed		Yes		Role: Air America host
2004	The Manchurian Candidate			Yes	
2004–2007	The Al Franken Show	Yes	Yes		Host of radio talk show
2004	Tanner on Tanner			Yes	
2006	Al Franken: God Spoke			Yes	Documentary
2011	Hot Coffee			Yes	Documentary
2017	Long Strange Trip			Yes	Documentary, as himself
2020	The Al Franken Podcast	Yes	Yes		Podcast, as himself
2022	Jimmy Kimmel Live!				Guest host
2023	The Daily Show				Guest host
2025	The Residence (TV series)		Yes		Role: Aaron Filkins, senior Senator from Washington

== Electoral history ==
=== 2008 ===
2008 Minnesota U.S. Senate election
Primary election
Party	Candidate	Votes	%
Democratic (DFL)	Al Franken	164,136	65.34
Democratic (DFL)	Priscilla Lord	74,655	29.72
Democratic (DFL)	Dick Franson	3,923	1.56
Democratic (DFL)	Bob Larson	3,152	1.25
Democratic (DFL)	Rob Fitzgerald	3,095	1.23
Democratic (DFL)	Ole Savior	1,227	0.49
Democratic (DFL)	Alve Erickson	1,017	0.40
Total votes		251,205	100%
General election
Democratic (DFL)	Al Franken	1,212,629	41.994
Republican	Norm Coleman (incumbent)	1,212,317	41.983
Independence	Dean Barkley	437,505	15.151
Libertarian	Charles Aldrich	13,923	0.482
Constitution	James Niemackl	8,907	0.308
Write-in		2,365	0.082
Margin of victory		312	0.011
Total votes		2,887,646	100%
Democratic (DFL) gain from Republican			

=== 2014 ===
2014 Minnesota U.S. Senate election
Primary election
Party	Candidate	Votes	%
Democratic (DFL)	Al Franken	182,720	94.50
Democratic (DFL)	Sandra Henningsgard	10,627	5.50
Total votes		193,347	100%
General election
Democratic (DFL)	Al Franken (incumbent)	1,053,205	53.15
Republican	Mike McFadden	850,227	42.91
Independence	Steve Carlson	47,530	2.40
Libertarian	Heather Johnson	29,685	1.50
Write-in		881	0.04
Margin of victory		202,978	10.24
Total votes		1,981,528	100%
Democratic (DFL) hold			

== See also ==
- Saturday Night Live cast members
- List of Harvard University politicians
- List of Jewish members of the United States Congress

== Explanatory notes ==
Media offices
Preceded by Andrew Smith	Head Writer of Saturday Night Live; 1985–1986; Served alongside: Tom Davis	Succeeded by Jim Downey
Preceded by Bob Tischler	Head Writer of Saturday Night Live; 1985–1986; Served alongside: Tom Davis	Succeeded by Jim Downey
Party political offices
Preceded by Walter Mondale	Democratic nominee for U.S. Senator from Minnesota (Class 2); 2008, 2014	Succeeded by Tina Smith
U.S. Senate
Preceded by Norm Coleman	U.S. Senator (Class 2) from Minnesota; 2009–2018; Served alongside: Amy Klobuchar	Succeeded by Tina Smith
U.S. order of precedence (ceremonial)
Preceded by Pete Wilson as Former U.S. Senator	Order of precedence of the United States	Succeeded by John Ensign as Former U.S. Senator
