= List of The Daily Show episodes (2007) =

- No. of episodes: 138

Release
- Original network: Comedy Central

Season chronology
- ← Previous; 2006 episodes Next → 2008 episodes

This is a list of episodes for The Daily Show with Jon Stewart in 2007.

== 2007 ==
=== January ===
Date	Guest	Promotion
January 8	Louis C.K.	Louis C.K.: Shameless
January 9	Harry Frankfurt	On Truth
January 10	Fmr. Gov. Mike Huckabee	From Hope to Higher Ground: 12 Stops to Restoring America's Greatness
January 11	Peter O'Toole	Venus
January 15	Josh Bernstein	Digging for the Truth
January 16	Michael Oren	Power, Faith, and Fantasy
January 17	Jerry Rice	Go Long: My Journey Beyond the Game and the Fame
January 18	Robin Wright Penn	Breaking and Entering
January 22	Gen. Rupert Smith	The Utility of Force
January 23	Terry McAuliffe	What A Party! My Life Among Democrats: Presidents, Candidates, Donors, Activists, Alligators, and Other Wild Animals
January 24	Scott McClellan	none, former White House Press Secretary
January 25	Sen. Chuck Schumer	Positively American
January 29	Bill Gates	Microsoft Windows Vista
January 30	Neil deGrasse Tyson	Death By Black Hole: And Other Cosmic Quandaries
January 31	Sen. Joe Biden	Biden's 2008 Presidential Campaign

=== February ===
Date	Guest	Promotion
February 1	Sienna Miller	Factory Girl
February 5	Walter Scheib	White House Chef
February 6	Mike Rowe	Dirty Jobs
February 7	Ralph Nader	The Seventeen Traditions and An Unreasonable Man
February 8	John Mellencamp	Freedom's Road
February 12	Jeffrey Rosen	The Supreme Court: The Personalities and Rivalries That Defined America
February 13	Christopher Horner	The Politically Incorrect Guide to Global Warming and Environmentalism
February 14	Ishmael Beah	A Long Way Gone: Memoirs of a Boy Soldier
February 15	Meredith Vieira	The Today Show
February 26	Craig Newmark	Craigslist
February 27	John Amaechi	Man in the Middle
February 28	Jake Gyllenhaal	Zodiac

=== March ===
Date	Guest	Promotion
March 1	Rev. Al Sharpton	Genealogical ties to Strom Thurmond
March 1	Sam Sheridan	A Fighter's Heart: One Man's Journey Through the World of Fighting
March 5	Bob Woodruff	In an Instant: A Family's Journey of Love and Healing
March 6	Richard Jadick	On Call In Hell: A Doctor's Iraq War Story
March 7	Wynton Marsalis	From the Plantation to the Penitentiary
March 8	Dr. Sharon Moalem	Survival of the Sickest: A Medical Maverick Discovers Why We Need Disease
March 12	Sen. Christopher Dodd	2008 presidential campaign
March 13	John Waters	'Til Death Do Us Part
March 14	Zbigniew Brzezinski	Second Chance: Three Presidents and the Crisis of American Superpower
March 15	Sandra Bullock	Premonition
March 19	Stephen Prothero	Religious Literacy: What Americans Need to Know
March 20	John Bolton	
March 21	Chris Hansen	To Catch a Predator
March 22	Don Cheadle	Reign Over Me
March 26	Sen. John Kerry	This Moment on Earth: Today's New Environmentalists and Their Vision for the Future
March 27	Dennis Miller	
March 28	Gov. Bill Richardson	Between Worlds: The Making of an American Life
March 29	Philip Zimbardo	The Lucifer Effect: Understanding How Good People Turn Evil

=== April ===
Date	Guest	Promotion
April 9	Bill Bradley	The New American Story
April 10	Walter Isaacson	Einstein: His Life and Universe
April 11	Halle Berry	Perfect Stranger
April 12	Richard Preston	The Wild Trees: A Story of Passion and Daring
April 16	Andrew Card	
April 17	Sig Hansen	Deadliest Catch
April 18	Ali Allawi	The Occupation of Iraq: Winning the War, Losing the Peace
April 19	Jeremy Scahill	Blackwater: The Rise of the World's Most Powerful Mercenary Army
April 23	Matthew Cooper	
April 24	Sen. John McCain	Character Is Destiny: Inspiring Stories Every Young Person Should Know and Every Adult Should Remember
April 25	Garry Shandling	The Larry Sanders Show DVD
April 26	Richard Gere	The Hoax
April 30	Christopher Hitchens	God Is Not Great: How Religion Poisons Everything

=== May ===
Date	Guest	Promotion
May 1	Tobey Maguire	Spider-Man 3
May 2	Pierre Rehov	Suicide Killers
May 3	Ted Koppel	Off Camera: Private Thoughts Made Public
May 7	Lee Gutkind	Almost Human: Making Robots Think
May 8	George Tenet	At the Center of the Storm: My Years at the CIA
May 9	Michael Beschloss	Presidential Courage: Brave Leaders and How They Changed America 1789-1989
May 10	Reza Aslan	No god but God: The Origins, Evolution, and Future of Islam
May 14	Jeremy Paxman	On Royalty: A Very Polite Inquiry Into Some Strangely Related Families
May 15	Tim Russert	Wisdom of Our Fathers: Lessons and Letters from Daughters and Sons
May 16	Don Rickles	Rickles' Book: A Memoir
May 17	Brink Lindsey	The Age of Abundance: How Prosperity Transformed America's Politics and Culture
May 21	Zaki Chehab	Inside Hamas: The Untold Story of the Militant Islamic Movement
May 22	Margaret Spellings	
May 23	Lt. Col. Kevin Robbins	U.S. Air Force Thunderbirds
May 24	Al Gore	The Assault on Reason

=== June ===
Date	Guest	Promotion
June 4	Rep. Ron Paul	Ron Paul presidential campaign, 2008
June 5	Paul Rudd	Knocked Up
June 6	Michael Barone	Our First Revolution: The Remarkable British Upheaval That Inspired America's Founding Fathers
June 7	Eddie Izzard	Ocean's Thirteen
June 11	David Steinberg	The Book of David
June 12	Robert Shrum	No Excuses: Concessions of a Serial Campaigner
June 13	Allan Brandt	The Cigarette Century: The Rise, Fall, and Deadly Persistence of the Product That Defined America
June 14	Angelina Jolie	A Mighty Heart
June 18	Steve Carell	Evan Almighty
June 19	Brian Williams	
June 20	Fareed Zakaria	The Future of Freedom: Illiberal Democracy at Home and Abroad
June 21	Greg Bear	Quantico
June 25	Steve Vogel	The Pentagon: A History
June 26	Bruce Willis	Live Free or Die Hard
June 27	Michael Moore	Sicko
June 28	Claire Danes	Evening

=== July ===
Date	Guest	Promotion
July 16	Josh Rushing	Mission Al-Jazeera: Build a Bridge, Seek the Truth, Change the World
July 17	Christopher Walken	Hairspray
July 18	Matt Groening	The Simpsons Movie
July 19	Adam Sandler	I Now Pronounce You Chuck & Larry
July 23	Neil deGrasse Tyson	NOVA scienceNOW
July 24	Robert Pallitto	Presidential Secrecy and the Law
July 25	Rob Gifford	China Road
July 26	Robert Dallek	Nixon and Kissinger: Partners in Power
July 30	Alastair Campbell	The Blair Years: The Alastair Campbell Diaries
July 31	Lewis Gordon Pugh	Long-distance swim in the waters of the North Pole

=== August ===
Date	Guest	Promotion
August 1	Jed Babbin	In the Words of our Enemies
August 2	Matt Damon	The Bourne Ultimatum
August 7	Andy Samberg	Hot Rod
August 8	Sen. Joe Biden	Promises to Keep: On Life and Politics
August 9	Tal Ben-Shahar	Happier: Learn the Secrets to Daily Joy and Lasting Fulfillment
August 13	Bill Kristol	The Weekly Standard
August 14	Denis Leary	Rescue Me
August 15	Stephen F. Hayes	Cheney: The Untold Story of America's Most Powerful and Controversial Vice President
August 16	Sen. John McCain	Hard Call: Great Decisions and the Extraordinary People Who Made Them
August 20	Nikolas Kozloff	Hugo Chavez: Oil, Politics, and the Challenge to the U.S.
August 21	Alan Weisman	The World Without Us
August 22	Sen. Barack Obama	Barack Obama presidential campaign, 2008
August 23	Lt. Col. John Nagl	The U.S. Army/Marine Corps Counterinsurgency Field Manual

=== September ===
Date	Guest	Promotion
September 10	Jeff Garlin	I Want Someone to Eat Cheese With
September 11	Jodie Foster	The Brave One
September 12	Robert Draper	Dead Certain: The Presidency of George W. Bush
September 13	Douglas Farah	Merchant of Death: Money, Guns, Planes, and the Man Who Makes War Possible
September 18	Alan Greenspan	The Age of Turbulence
September 19	Gen. Wesley Clark	A Time to Lead: For Duty, Honor and Country
September 20	President Bill Clinton	Giving: How Each of Us Can Change the World
September 24	John Bowe	Nobodies: Modern American Slave Labor and the Dark Side of the New Global Economy
September 25	President Evo Morales	President of Bolivia
September 26	Jamie Foxx	The Kingdom
September 27	Ken Burns	The War

=== October ===
Date	Guest	Promotion
October 1	Jack Cafferty	It's Getting Ugly Out There
October 2	Chris Matthews	Life's a Campaign: What Politics Has Taught Me About Friendship, Rivalry, Reputation, and Success
October 3	Ted Koppel	Koppel on Discovery
October 4	Jack Goldsmith	The Terror Presidency
October 8	Vicente Fox	Revolution of Hope
October 9	Tiki Barber	Tiki: My Life in the Game and Beyond
October 10	Lynne Cheney	Blue Skies, No Fences
October 11	Howard Kurtz	Reality Show: Inside the Last Great Television News War
October 15	Tony Snow	
October 16	Stephen Colbert	Presidential candidacy
October 16	Meryl Streep	Rendition, Lions for Lambs
October 17	Jake Gyllenhaal	Rendition
October 18	Ben Affleck	Gone, Baby, Gone
October 29	Michael Gerson	Heroic Conservatism: Why Republicans Need to Embrace America's Ideals (And Why They Deserve to Fail If They Don't)
October 30	Valerie Plame Wilson	Fair Game: My Life as a Spy, My Betrayal by the White House
October 31	David Wright	David Wright Foundation

=== November ===
Date	Guest	Promotion
November 1	Jerry Seinfeld	Bee Movie

There were no further episodes produced in November due to the 2007–08 Writers Guild of America strike.

=== December ===
There were no episodes produced in December due to the 2007–08 Writers Guild of America strike.
