= List of The Daily Show episodes (2006) =

- No. of episodes: 161

Release
- Original network: Comedy Central

Season chronology
- ← Previous; 2005 episodes Next → 2007 episodes

This is a list of episodes for The Daily Show with Jon Stewart in 2006.

== 2006 ==
=== January ===
Date	Guest	Promotion
January 4	George Packer	The Assassins' Gate: America in Iraq
January 5	Pierce Brosnan	The Matador
January 9	James Risen	State of War: The Secret History of the CIA and the Bush Administration
January 10	Albert Brooks	Looking for Comedy in the Muslim World
January 11	Peter Bergen	The Osama bin Laden I Know: An Oral History of al Qaeda's Leader
January 12	Edward Lazarus	Closed Chambers: The Rise, Fall, and Future of the Modern Supreme Court
January 16	Eugene Jarecki	Why We Fight
January 17	L. Paul Bremer	My Year in Iraq: The Struggle to Build a Future of Hope
January 18	R. James Woolsey Jr.	"A former Director of the CIA under the Clinton administration; he is currently Vice President of Booz Allen Hamilton."
January 19	Josh Lucas	Glory Road
January 23	Fred Barnes	Rebel-in-Chief: Inside the Bold and Controversial Presidency of George W. Bush
January 24	Reza Aslan	No god but God: The Origins, Evolution, and Future of Islam
January 25	Anthony Hopkins	The World's Fastest Indian
January 26	Bernard-Henri Lévy	American Vertigo: Traveling America in the Footsteps of Tocqueville
January 30	Randy Jackson	American Idol
January 31	Charles Barkley	Who's Afraid of a Large Black Man?

=== February ===
Date	Guest	Promotion
February 1	Michael Beschloss	"A renowned presidential historian and best-selling author."
February 2	Robert O'Harrow Jr.	No Place to Hide
February 7	Torie Clarke	Lipstick on a Pig: Winning in the No-Spin Era by Someone Who Knows the Game
February 8	Harrison Ford	Firewall
February 9	Will Arnett	Arrested Development (episode hosted by Rob Corddry)
February 13	Astronaut Mike Mullane	Riding Rockets: The Outrageous Tales of a Space Shuttle Astronaut
February 14	Peter Tertzakian	A Thousand Barrels a Second
February 15	Julianne Moore	Freedomland
February 16	Ed Harris	Winter Passing
February 21	Sarah Vowell	Assassination Vacation
February 22	Matthew Fox	Lost
February 23	Roger Ebert	The Great Movies II

=== March ===
Date	Guest	Promotion
March 7	Eugene Linden	The Winds of Change: Climate, Weather, and the Destruction of Civilizations
March 8	Neil Young	Neil Young: Heart of Gold
March 9	Bruce Bartlett	Impostor : How George W. Bush Bankrupted America and Betrayed the Reagan Legacy
March 13	Eric Burns	Infamous Scribblers
March 14	Bart Ehrman	Misquoting Jesus
March 15	Natalie Portman	V for Vendetta
March 16	Vin Diesel	Find Me Guilty, and possibly Tigon Studios.
March 20	Clive Owen	Inside Man
March 21	Georges Sada	Saddam's Secrets
March 22	Senator Russ Feingold	"The Democratic junior senator who has recently called for the censure of President Bush."
March 23	Michael Mandelbaum	The Case for Golaith
March 27	Michael Gordon	Cobra II
March 28	Fareed Zakaria	The editor of Newsweek International... and host of Foreign Exchange on PBS to talk about illegal immigration to the United States, and Iraq.
March 29	Queen Latifah	Ice Age: The Meltdown
March 30	Sharon Stone	Basic Instinct 2

=== April ===
Date	Guest	Promotion
April 3	Ricky Gervais	More Flanimals
April 4	Studs Terkel	And They All Sang: Adventures of an Eclectic Disc Jockey
April 5	Tony Zinni	The Battle for Peace; N.B. this was a special episode entitled, "Race: The AfroSpanicIndioAsianization of America", which focused on race relations in America.
April 6	Josh Hartnett	Lucky Number Slevin
April 17	Jon Meacham	American Gospel : God, the Founding Fathers, and the Making of a Nation
April 18	Ryan Nerz	Eat This Book: A Year of Gorging and Glory on the Competitive Eating Circuit
April 19	Dennis Quaid	American Dreamz
April 20	Ted Kennedy	America Back on Track
April 24	Efraim Halevy	Man in the Shadows
April 25	Tom Selleck	Jesse Stone: Death in Paradise (made for TV movie)
April 26	Kimberley Strassel	"A member of the Wall Street Journal Editorial Board... [to speak] about the oil industry and the rising price of gasoline."
April 27	Robin Williams	RV

=== May ===
Date	Guest	Promotion
May 1	Matthew Continetti	The K Street Gang
May 2	Madeleine Albright	The Mighty and the Almighty
May 3	Clark Kent Ervin	Where America is Vulnerable to Attack
May 4	John Malkovich	Art School Confidential
May 8	David Remnick	Reporting
May 9	Eric Shawn	The UN Exposed
May 10	Billy Connolly	Billy Connolly - Live In New York
May 11	Francis Fukuyama	America at the Crossroads
May 15	Howard Dean	The Democratic Party
May 16	Denis Leary	Rescue Me
May 17	Ramesh Ponnuru	The Party of Death
May 18	Willie Nelson	The Tao of Willie

=== June ===
Date	Guest	Promotion
June 5	Caroline Kennedy	Profiles in Courage
June 6	William John Bennett	America: The Last Best Hope
June 7	Bonnie Hunt	Cars
June 8	Lily Tomlin	A Prairie Home Companion
June 12	Thomas Friedman	The World Is Flat
June 13	Ken Mehlman	The Republican Party
June 14	Tim Russert	Meet the Press
June 15	Louis C.K.	Lucky Louie
June 19	Calvin Trillin	A Heckuva Job
June 20	Juliet Eilperin	Fight Club Politics
June 21	Anderson Cooper	Dispatches from the Edge
June 22	Adam Sandler	Click
June 26	Lance Armstrong	ESPY Awards
June 27	Helen Thomas	Watchdogs of Democracy? : The Waning Washington Press Corps and How It Has Failed the Public (Scribner, 2006) ISBN 0-7432-6781-8
June 28	Al Gore	An Inconvenient Truth
June 29	Kevin Spacey	Superman Returns

=== July ===
Date	Guest	Promotion
July 10	Ilario Pantano	Warlord: No Better Friend, No Worse Enemy
July 11	John Dean	Conservatives without Conscience
July 12	Shawn Wayans	Little Man
July 13	Owen Wilson	You, Me and Dupree
July 17	Gordon G. Chang	Nuclear Showdown: North Korea Takes On The World; Daily Show's Tenth Anniversary (although July 22, 2006 would be the exact date)
July 18	M. Night Shyamalan	Lady in the Water
July 19	James Maguire	American Bee: The National Spelling Bee and the Culture of Word Nerds
July 20	Paul Giamatti	Lady in the Water
July 24	John McCain	
July 25	Edward Burns	The Groomsmen
July 26	Sharon Weinberger	Imaginary Weapons
July 27	Alon Ben-Meir	Professor of New York University (NYU) International Relations and Middle East Director of The World Policy Institute at The New School, to talk about 2006 Israel-Lebanon conflict
July 31	Will Ferrell	Talladega Nights: The Ballad of Ricky Bobby

=== August ===
Date	Guest	Promotion
August 1	Vali Nasr	The Shia Revival: How Conflicts within Islam Will Shape the Future
August 2	Chris Paine	Who Killed the Electric Car?
August 3	Danny DeVito	It's Always Sunny in Philadelphia
August 8	Brian Williams	NBC Nightly News
August 9	Craig Glenday	Guinness World Records
August 10	Dale Earnhardt Jr.	
August 14	Thomas E. Ricks	Fiasco: The American Military Adventure in Iraq
August 15	Samuel L. Jackson	Snakes on a Plane
August 16	Thomas Kean	Without Precedent: The Inside Story of the 9/11 Commission
August 17	Matt Dillon	Factotum
August 21	Reza Aslan	No god but God (paperback)
August 22	William Cohen	Dragon Fire
August 23	Frederick S. Lane	The Decency Wars
August 24	Martin Short	Martin Short: Fame Becomes Me

=== September ===
Date	Guest	Promotion
September 11	Maggie Gyllenhaal	Sherrybaby
September 12	Gary Hart	The Courage Of Our Convictions
September 13	Ed Gillespie	Winning Right
September 14	Norm Macdonald	Ridiculous
September 18	Bill Clinton	Clinton Global Initiative
September 19	Ben Affleck	Hollywoodland
September 20	Johnny Knoxville	Jackass Number Two
September 21	CC Goldwater	Mr. Conservative: Goldwater on Goldwater
September 25	Pat Buchanan	State of Emergency: The Third World Invasion and Conquest of America
September 26	Pervez Musharraf	In the Line of Fire: A Memoir
September 27	Al Franken	The Truth (with jokes)
September 28	Jim McGreevey	The Confession

=== October ===
Date	Guest	Promotion
October 2	Trent Lott	Herding Cats: A Life in Politics
October 3	Dennis Miller	
October 4	Ian Bremmer	The J Curve: A New Way to Understand Why Nations Rise and Fall
October 5	David Rakoff	Don't Get Too Comfortable
October 9	James Baker	Work Hard, Study ... and Keep Out of Politics!
October 10	David Cross	Freak Show
October 11	Lou Dobbs	War on the Middle Class
October 12	David Mark	Going Dirty: The Art of Negative Campaigning
October 16	Frank Rich	The Greatest Story Ever Sold
October 17	Amy Sedaris	I Like You: Hospitality Under the Influence
October 18	John Ashcroft	Never Again
October 19	Kirsten Dunst	Marie Antoinette
October 30	LeBron James	
October 31	John Mueller	Overblown

=== November ===
Date	Guest	Promotion
November 1	None	Battlefield Ohio: The Daily Show's Midwest Midterm Midtacular
November 2	Sacha Baron Cohen	Borat: Cultural Learnings of America for Make Benefit Glorious Nation of Kazakhstan
November 6	Jerry Seinfeld	Bee Movie & Seinfeld Season 7 DVD
November 7	Dan Rather	2006 Midterm Elections Coverage
November 8	Howard Dean	2006 Midterm Elections Coverage
November 9	Dustin Hoffman	Stranger than Fiction
November 13	Tina Fey	30 Rock
November 14	John Edwards	Home: The Blueprints of Our Lives
November 15	Ted Koppel	Iran - The Most Dangerous Nation (Discovery Channel documentary)
November 16	Muhammad Yunus	Banker to the Poor
November 27	Rahm Emanuel	The Plan: Big Ideas for America
November 28	Tom Waits	Orphans: Brawlers, Bawlers & Bastards
November 29	George Clooney	The Good German
November 30	Tenacious D	Tenacious D in The Pick of Destiny

=== December ===
Date	Guest	Promotion
December 4	Nathan Lane	Butley (Broadway Play)
December 5	John Danforth	Faith and Politics
December 6	Eve Herold	Stem Cell Wars (ISBN 1-4039-7499-3)
December 7	Ed Viesturs	No Shortcuts to the Top (ISBN 0-7679-2470-3)
December 11	Lincoln Chafee	
December 12	Fareed Zakaria	
December 13	Ricky Gervais	Night at the Museum
December 14	Rajiv Chandrasekaran	Imperial Life in the Emerald City: Inside Iraq's Green Zone (ISBN 1-4000-4487-1)
December 18	Tom Vilsack	
December 19	Bill Kristol	
December 20	Ben Stiller	Night at the Museum
