= List of The Daily Show episodes (2005) =

- No. of episodes: 159

Release
- Original network: Comedy Central

Season chronology
- ← Previous; 2004 episodes Next → 2006 episodes

This is a list of episodes for The Daily Show with Jon Stewart in 2005.

== 2005 ==
=== January ===
Date	Guest	Promotion
January 4	Paul Giamatti	Sideways
January 5	Don Cheadle	Hotel Rwanda
January 6	Howard Zinn	Voices of a People's History of the United States (ISBN 1-58322-647-8)
January 10	John Grisham	The Broker
January 11	Samuel L. Jackson	Coach Carter
January 12	Dennis Quaid	In Good Company
January 13	Annette Bening	Being Julia
January 17	Brian Ross	None
January 18	Jim Wallis	God's Politics: Why the Right Gets It Wrong and the Left Doesn't Get It (ISBN 0-06-055828-8)
January 19	Michael Beschloss	None
January 20	Sen. Joe Lieberman	(via satellite)
January 24	Richard Viguerie	America's Right Turn: How Conservatives Used New and Alternative Media to Take Power (ISBN 1-56625-252-0)
January 25	Seymour Hersh	The New Yorker
January 26	John Leguizamo	Assault on Precinct 13
January 27	Christine Todd Whitman	It's My Party, Too: Taking Back the Republican Party... And Bringing the Country Together Again (ISBN 1-59420-040-8)
January 31	Fareed Zakaria	None

=== February ===
Date	Guest	Promotion
February 1	Paula Abdul	American Idol
February 2	Anderson Cooper	Anderson Cooper 360
February 3	Joe Klein	None
February 14	Redmond O'Hanlon	Trawler (ISBN 1-4000-4275-5)
February 15	Eric Idle	The Greedy Bastard Diary: A Comic Tour of America (ISBN 0-06-075864-3)
February 16	Alan Cumming	Son of the Mask
February 17	Mark P. Mills	The Bottomless Well: The Twilight of Fuel, the Virtue of Waste, and Why We Will Never Run Out of Energy (ISBN 0-465-03116-1)
February 22	Rachel Weisz	Constantine
February 23	Peter Jennings	Peter Jennings' Reporting UFO's: Seeing is Believing
February 24	Christina Ricci	Cursed
February 28	Ben Nelson	None

=== March ===
Date	Guest	Promotion
March 1	Nancy Soderberg	The Superpower Myth: The Use and Misuse of American Might (ISBN 0-471-78964-X)
March 2	The Rock	Be Cool
March 3	Ari Fleischer	Taking Heat: The President, the Press, and My Years in the White House
March 7	Melissa Boyle Mahle	Denial and Deception: An Insider's View of the CIA from Iran-Contra to 9/11
March 8	Brian Williams	NBC Nightly News with Brian Williams
March 9	Bruce Willis	Hostage
March 10	Paul Krugman	None
March 14	Harry Frankfurt	On Bullshit
March 15	Tom Fenton	Bad News: The Decline of Reporting, the Business of News, and the Danger to Us All
March 16	Al Green	Everything's OK
March 17	Craig Ferguson	The Late Late Show with Craig Ferguson
March 21	Sandra Bullock	Miss Congeniality 2: Armed and Fabulous
March 22	Catherine Keener	The Ballad of Jack and Rose
March 23	Ozzy Osbourne	The Osbournes, Prince of Darkness
March 24	RZA	The Wu-Tang Manual

=== April ===
Date	Guest	Promotion
April 4	Reggie Miller	None
April 5	Thomas L. Friedman	The World Is Flat
April 6	Matthew McConaughey	Sahara
April 7	Drew Barrymore	Fever Pitch
April 11	Byron York	The Vast Left Wing Conspiracy (ISBN 1-4000-8238-2)
April 12	Bob Dole	One Soldier's Story: A Memoir (ISBN 0-06-076341-8)
April 13	John Avlon	Independent Nation (ISBN 1-4000-5024-3)
April 14	David Duchovny	House of D
April 18	Robert Reich	Reason (ISBN 1-4000-4221-6)
April 19	Sarah Vowell	Assassination Vacation (ISBN 0-7432-6003-1)
April 20	Dennis Miller	None, but clip shown from Dennis Miller Live
April 21	Reza Aslan	No god but God (ISBN 1-4000-6213-6)
April 25	Floyd Abrams	Speaking Freely (ISBN 0-670-03375-8)
April 26	Ice Cube	XXX: State of the Union
April 27	Christina Hoff Sommers	One Nation Under Therapy (ISBN 0-312-30443-9)
April 28	Steven Levitt	Freakonomics

=== May ===
Date	Guest	Promotion
May 2	Zell Miller	A Deficit of Decency (ISBN 0-9745376-3-2)
May 3	Christiane Amanpour	None
May 4	Martin Short	Jiminy Glick in Lalawood
May 5	Tom Ridge	None
May 9	Kathleen Turner	Who's Afraid of Virginia Woolf?
May 10	Wanda Sykes	Monster-in-Law
May 11	Al Roker	Big Shoes: In Celebration of Dads and Fatherhood (ISBN 1-4013-0171-1)
May 12	Tracey Ullman	Tracey Ullman: Live and Exposed
May 31	Gerald Posner	Secrets of the Kingdom: The Inside Story of the Secret Saudi-U.S. Connection (ISBN 1-4000-6291-8)

=== June ===
Date	Guest	Promotion
June 1	Bo Bice	"Inside Your Heaven"/"Vehicle" single
June 2	Russell Crowe	Cinderella Man
June 6	Newt Gingrich	Never Call Retreat: Lee and Grant: The Final Victory (ISBN 0-312-34298-5)
June 7	Steven Johnson	Everything Bad Is Good For You: How Today's Popular Culture Is Actually Making Us Smarter (ISBN 1-57322-307-7)
June 8	Colin Powell	None
June 9	Matt Lauer	
June 13	Larry Diamond	Squandered Victory (ISBN 0-8050-7868-1)
June 14	Will Ferrell	Bewitched
June 15	Flynt Leverett	Inheriting Syria: Bashar's Trial by Fire (ISBN 0-8157-5204-0)
June 16	Kenneth Timmerman	Countdown to Crisis: The Coming Nuclear Showdown with Iran (ISBN 1-4000-5368-4)
June 20	Ringo Starr	Choose Love
June 21	Dwight Yoakam	Blame the Vain
June 22	Bill Moyers	Moyers on America (ISBN 1-4000-9536-0)
June 23	Howard Dean	None
June 27	Hanna Rosin	"God and Country" article in The New Yorker
June 28	Morgan Spurlock	30 Days and Don't Eat This Book: Fast Food and the Supersizing of America (ISBN 0-399-15260-1)

=== July ===
Date	Guest	Promotion
July 11	Marci Hamilton	God vs. the Gavel: Religion and the Rule of Law (ISBN 0-521-85304-4)
July 12	Matt Taibbi	Spanking the Donkey: Dispatches from the Dumb Season (ISBN 1-56584-891-8)
July 13	Bernard Goldberg	100 People Who Are Screwing Up America
July 14	Michael Isikoff	None
July 18	Bob Woodward, Carl Bernstein	The Secret Man: The Story of Watergate's Deep Throat (ISBN 0-7432-8715-0)
July 19	Billy Bob Thornton	Bad News Bears
July 20	Robert F. Kennedy Jr.	Natural Resources Defense Council
July 21	Fareed Zakaria	None
July 25	Sen. Rick Santorum	It Takes a Family: Conservatism and the Common Good (ISBN 1-932236-29-5)
July 26	Diane Lane	Must Love Dogs
July 27	Bob Costas	Costas Now
July 28	Maggie Gyllenhaal	Happy Endings

=== August ===
Date	Guest	Promotion
August 2	Sen. Joe Biden	None
August 3	John Crawford	The Last True Story I'll Ever Tell: An Accidental Soldier's Account of the War in Iraq (ISBN 1-57322-314-X)
August 4	Miles O'Brien	American Morning
August 8	Paul Rudd	The 40-Year-Old Virgin
August 9	Kate Hudson	The Skeleton Key
August 10	John Hockenberry	
August 11	André Benjamin	Four Brothers
August 15	Steve Carell	The 40-Year-Old Virgin (also confirmed his resignation from TDS)
August 16	Seymour Hersh	Chain of Command: The Road from 9/11 to Abu Ghraib (ISBN 0-06-095537-6)
August 17	John Irving	Until I Find You: A Novel (ISBN 1-4000-6383-3)
August 18	John H. Richardson, Jr.	My Father the Spy: An Investigative Memoir (ISBN 0-06-051035-8)
August 22	Chris Wallace	
August 23	Rachel Weisz	The Constant Gardener
August 24	Sen. Trent Lott	Herding Cats: A Life in Politics (ISBN 0-06-059931-6)
August 25	Christopher Hitchens	Thomas Jefferson: Author of America (ISBN 0-06-059896-4)

=== September ===
Date	Guest	Promotion
September 6	Dr. Marc Siegel	False Alarm: The Truth About the Epidemic of Fear (ISBN 0-471-67869-4)
September 7	Samuel L. Jackson	The Man
September 8	Brian Williams	NBC Nightly News with Brian Williams
September 12	Chris Mooney	The Republican War on Science (ISBN 0-465-04675-4)
September 13	Kurt Vonnegut	A Man Without a Country
September 14	Dr. Edward J. Larson, Dr. William A. Dembski, Ellie Crystal	Panel Discussion on Evolution
September 15	Gwyneth Paltrow	Proof
September 20	Alan Alda	Never Have Your Dog Stuffed (ISBN 1-4000-6409-0)
September 21	Ricky Gervais	Extras
September 22	George Clooney	Good Night, and Good Luck
September 26	Dr. Irwin Redlener	The Children's Help Fund
September 27	Viggo Mortensen	A History of Violence
September 28	Jeff Garlin	Curb Your Enthusiasm
September 29	Sen. Chuck Schumer	

=== October ===
Date	Guest	Promotion
October 3	David Rakoff	Don't Get Too Comfortable (ISBN 0-385-51036-5)
October 4	Cameron Diaz	In Her Shoes
October 5	Sen. John Edwards	
October 6	Philip Seymour Hoffman	Capote
October 17	Dolly Parton	Those Were The Days
October 18	Bill O'Reilly	The O'Reilly Factor for Kids: A Survival Guide for America's Families (ISBN 0-06-054424-4)
October 19	Louis Freeh	My FBI
October 20	Dwayne "The Rock" Johnson	Doom
October 24	William Kristol	The Weekly Standard
October 25	Al Franken	The Truth (with jokes)
October 26	Doris Kearns Goodwin	Team of Rivals: The Political Genius of Abraham Lincoln
October 27	Janis Karpinski	One Woman's Army: The Commanding General of Abu Ghraib Tells Her Story
October 31	D.L. Hughley	Weekends at the D.L.

=== November ===
Date	Guest	Promotion
November 1	Sen. Barbara Boxer	A Time to Run
November 2	Mike Wallace	Between You and Me: A Memoir
November 3	Robert Ray	None
November 7	Sen. Barack Obama	Dreams from My Father: A Story of Race and Inheritance
November 8	Sen. John McCain	Character Is Destiny: Inspiring Stories Every Young Person Should Know and Every Adult Should Remember
November 9	Keira Knightley	Pride and Prejudice
November 10	Chris Elliott	The Shroud of the Thwacker
November 14	Martha Stewart	The Apprentice: Martha Stewart
November 15	Rosario Dawson	Rent
November 16	John Hodgman	The Areas of My Expertise
November 17	Richard Clarke	The Scorpion's Gate
November 28	Adrien Brody	King Kong
November 29	Peggy Noonan	John Paul the Great: Remembering a Spiritual Father (ISBN 0-670-03748-6)
November 30	Rep. Nancy Pelosi	None

=== December ===
Date	Guest	Promotion
December 1	The White Stripes	Get Behind Me Satan
December 5	Jimmy Carter	Our Endangered Values: America's Moral Crisis
December 6	Michelle Yeoh	Memoirs of a Geisha
December 7	David McCullough	1776
December 8	Ken Auletta	The New Yorker
December 13	Howard Stern	The Howard Stern Show
December 14	Tom Brokaw	Tom Brokaw Reports: To War and Back
December 15	Sarah Jessica Parker	The Family Stone
