= James Pinkerton =

American writer and political analyst

James P. Pinkerton
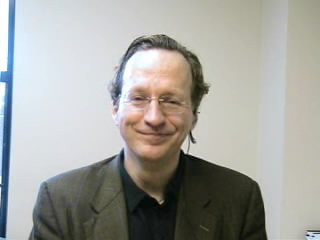
- Born: March 11, 1958 (age 68)
- Other name: Jim Pinkerton
- Education: Stanford University (1980)
- Occupations: Journalist, author, pundit
- Notable credit(s): Columnist for Newsday; regular panelist on the Fox News program Fox News Watch; contributor to The Huffington Post; frequent guest on BloggingHeads.tv
- Website: jamesppinkerton.blogspot.com

James "Jim" P. Pinkerton (born March 11, 1958) is an American columnist, author, and political analyst.

== Career ==
A graduate of Evanston Township High School (1975) and Stanford University (1980), he served on the White House staff under both Ronald Reagan and George H. W. Bush and on each of their presidential campaigns from 1980 to 1992. In January 2008, he became a senior adviser to the Mike Huckabee 2008 presidential campaign.

== After Washington ==
Since his time in government Pinkerton has become a columnist for Newsday and a Fox News Channel Contributor (1996 to present). He is a former panelist (1998–2013) on the Fox News program Fox News Watch, and a frequent contributor to Breitbart as well as an occasional contributor to The Huffington Post, National Review, and other publications. In the past, he was a senior fellow at both the Free Enterprise Fund and the New America Foundation, a lecturer at the Graduate School of Political Management at The George Washington University, a member of the Board of Advisors at the National Federation of Republican Assemblies, and a contributing editor of The American Conservative and USA Today. He frequently appears on Bloggingheads.tv, often in video discussions with journalist David Corn and other media personalities. He is now the editor of CureStrategy.org.

In 2011, he became the co-chair of the RATE Coalition, a bi-partisan group of 35 companies and associations dedicated to corporate tax reform.

Although he is a Republican with views broadly in sync with the GOP, he has sometimes divergent ideas: For example, in a Bloggingheads discussion with economist Glenn Loury, Pinkerton described his political ideology as "Hamiltonian". He favors a robust US industrial policy that would stimulate industry and calls himself a "big government libertarian".

Pinkerton moderated the 2008 Libertarian presidential debate in Denver.

Leaked emails obtained by BuzzFeed News showed that former Donald Trump Campaign Manager and then Breitbart Executive Chairman, Steve Bannon, sent Pinkerton an article due to be published on far-right website on the taxonomy of the alt-right.

== Personal life ==
On June 7, 2008, Pinkerton married Elizabeth Dial.

Pinkerton is 6 feet, 9 inches tall.
