= List of The Daily Show episodes (2003) =

- No. of episodes: 162

Release
- Original network: Comedy Central

Season chronology
- ← Previous; 2002 episodes Next → 2004 episodes

This is a list of episodes for The Daily Show with Jon Stewart in 2003.

== 2003 ==
=== January ===
2003 Ep. No.	Date	Guest	Promotion
1	January 7	Cameron Diaz	Gangs of New York
2	January 8	Ray Liotta	Narc
3	January 9	Philip Seymour Hoffman	Owning Mahowny
4	January 13	Kathy Bates	About Schmidt
5	January 14	Michael Moore	Bowling for Columbine
6	January 15	Dave Chappelle	Chappelle's Show
7	January 16	Joseph Lieberman	
8	January 20	Merv Griffin	
9	January 21	Simon Cowell	American Idol
10	January 22	John C. Reilly	The Hours
11	January 23	Jimmy Kimmel	Jimmy Kimmel Live!
12	January 27	Rosie Perez	Frankie and Johnny in the Clair de Lune
13	January 28	Sam Rockwell	
14	January 29	Jeff Greenfield	
15	January 30	Laurence Fishburne	Biker Boyz

=== February ===
2003 Ep. No.	Date	Guest	Promotion
16	February 3	Doug Wilson	
17	February 4	Kate Hudson	How to Lose a Guy in 10 Days
18	February 5	Arianna Huffington	Pigs at the Trough
19	February 6	David Frum	The Right Man: The Surprise Presidency of George W. Bush
20	February 10	Joe Klein	The Natural: Bill Clinton's Misunderstood Presidency
21	February 11	Bebe Neuwirth	How to Lose a Guy in 10 Days
22	February 12	Michael Clarke Duncan	Daredevil
23	February 13	Ben Affleck	Daredevil
24	February 18	Steve Kroft	60 Minutes
25	February 19	Jeff Daniels	Gods and Generals
26	February 20	Luke Wilson	Old School

=== March ===
2003 Ep. No.	Date	Guest	Promotion
27	March 3	Eric Idle	The Rutland Isles
28	March 4	Walter Isaacson	
29	March 5	Adrien Brody	The Pianist
30	March 6	David Cross (show hosted by Stephen Colbert)	Shut Up You Fucking Baby
31	March 10	Les Gelb	
32	March 11	Colin Quinn	Tough Crowd With Colin Quinn
33	March 12	Dick Gephardt	
34	March 13	Tom Cavanagh	Ed
35	March 17	Eric Alterman	What Liberal Media?
36	March 18	Jason Lee	Dreamcatcher
37	March 19	John Hulsman	
38	March 20	Eddie Griffin	DysFunktional Family
39	March 24	Jim Kelly (managing editor of Time magazine (2001–2005))	
40	March 25	Connie Nielsen	Basic
41	March 26	Ringo Starr	Ringorama
42	March 27	Hilary Swank	The Core
43	March 31	Chris Rock	Head of State

=== April ===
2003 Ep. No.	Date	Guest	Promotion
44	April 1	Anthony Swofford	Jarhead
45	April 2	Kelly Preston	What a Girl Wants
46	April 3	Colin Farrell	Phone Booth
47	April 7	Martha Burk	NCWO
48	April 8	Susan Sarandon	Ice Bound
49	April 9	Ambassador David Scheffer	
50	April 10	Dennis Miller	The Raw Feed (HBO special)
51	April 21	Patrick Stewart	X2
52	April 22	Rachel Weisz	Confidence
53	April 23	Richard Lewis	
54	April 24	Fareed Zakaria	The Future Of Freedom
55	April 28	Dr Sanjay Gupta	CNN
56	April 29	Julia Louis-Dreyfus	Watching Ellie
57	April 30	John Malkovich	The Dancer Upstairs

=== May ===
2003 Ep. No.	Date	Guest	Promotion
58	May 1	Famke Janssen	X2
59	May 5	Chris Matthews	The Chris Matthews Show
60	May 6	Caroline Kennedy	A Patriot's Handbook
61	May 7	Graham Norton	So Graham Norton
62	May 8	Paul Rudd	The Shape of Things
63	May 12	Randy Jackson	American Idol
64	May 13	Joshua Jackson	Dawson's Creek
65	May 14	Diane Ravitch	The Language Police
66	May 15	Michael Kinsley	Slate
67	May 26	Iraq - A Look Baq (or how we learned to stop reporting and love the war)	
68	May 27	William Kristol	The Weekly Standard
69	May 28	Lisa Ling	National Geographic Ultimate Explorer
70	May 29	David Halberstam	The Teammates

=== June ===
2003 Ep. No.	Date	Guest	Promotion
71	June 2	Bill Hemmer	American Morning CNN
72	June 3	Eddie Izzard	Sexie
73	June 4	Madeleine Albright	Former Secretary of State
74	June 5	Tyrese Gibson	2 Fast 2 Furious
75	June 8	Looking Beyond The Show	
76	June 9	Guy Pearce	The Hard Word
77	June 10	Newt Gingrich	Gettysburg
78	June 11	Sidney Blumenthal	The Clinton Wars
79	June 12	Ludacris	2 Fast 2 Furious
80	June 16	Harrison Ford	Hollywood Homicide
81	June 17	Lewis Lapham	Harper's Magazine
82	June 18	Kelly Clarkson	From Justin to Kelly
83	June 19	Ron Livingston	Sex and the City

=== July ===
2003 Ep. No,	Date	Guest	Promotion
84	July 8	Tony Snow	
85	July 9	Erica Jong	Sappho's Leap
86	July 10	Carson Daly	
87	July 14	Angelina Jolie	Lara Croft Tomb Raider: The Cradle of Life
88	July 15	Gary Hart	
89	July 16	Rowan Atkinson	Johnny English
90	July 17	Martin Lawrence	Bad Boys II
91	July 21	Gabrielle Union	Bad Boys II
92	July 22	Scott Glenn	Buffalo Soldiers
93	July 23	Dick Morris	Off with Their Heads : Traitors, Crooks & Obstructionists in American Politics, Media & Business
94	July 24	Joseph C. Wilson	
95	July 28	Paul Teutul Sr., Paul Teutul Jr.	American Chopper
96	July 29	Brian Williams	
97	July 30	Alyson Hannigan	American Wedding
98	July 31	Soledad O'Brien	American Morning

=== August ===
2003 Ep. No.	Date	Guest	Promotion
99	August 4	Denis Leary	The Secret Lives of Dentists
100	August 5	John Popper	Truth Be Told
101	August 6	Robert Duvall	Open Range
102	August 7	Tracey Ullman	Tracey Ullman in Trailer Tales (HBO Special)
103	August 11	Samuel L. Jackson	S.W.A.T.
104	August 12	Kim Cattrall	Sex and the City
105	August 13	Paul Giamatti	American Splendor
106	August 14	Again, A Look Back	Stephen Colbert's Clip show from 2002, used to preempt due to the northeast blackout of 2003
107	August 18	Jim Hightower	Thieves in High Places: They've Stolen Our Country—And It's Time to Take It Back
108	August 19	Cynthia Nixon	Sex and the City
109	August 20	Will Shortz	Will Shortz's Crossword Puzzles
110	August 21	Dennis Kucinich	None

=== September ===
2003 Ep. No.	Date	Guest	Promotion
111	September 1	I'm a Correspondent, Please Don't Fire Me!	Rob Corddry and Ed Helms clip show
112	September 9	Al Franken	Lies and the Lying Liars Who Tell Them: A Fair and Balanced Look at the Right ISBN 0-525-94764-7
113	September 10	Kate Beckinsale	Underworld
114	September 11	No Guest	
115	September 15	Sen. John Edwards, Cuba Gooding, Jr.	(Edwards' presidential candidacy announcement); The Fighting Temptations
116	September 16	Madeleine Albright	Madam Secretary
117	September 17	Charlie Sheen	Two and a Half Men
118	September 18	Christina Ricci	Anything Else
119	September 23	Michael Caine	Secondhand Lions
120	September 24	Ben Stiller	Duplex
121	September 25	Jonah Goldberg	None
122	September 29	Jack Black	School of Rock
123	September 30	Joe Scarborough	Scarborough Country

=== October ===
2003 Ep. No.	Date	Guest	Promotion
124	October 1	Vivica A. Fox	Kill Bill: Volume 1
125	October 2	Rob Lowe	The Lyon's Den
126	October 6	Michael Moore	Dude, Where's My Country?
127	October 7	Ronny Cox, Marc Singer, Robert Amstler, Arianna Huffington	(Re-Decision 2003 Special)
128	October 8	Sen. Hillary Clinton	Living History
129	October 9	Tim Robbins	Mystic River
130	October 20	Henry Kissinger	Crisis: The Anatomy of Two Major Foreign Policy Crises
131	October 21	Angelina Jolie	Beyond Borders
132	October 22	Walter Isaacson	Benjamin Franklin: An American Life
133	October 23	Anthony Hopkins	The Human Stain
134	October 27	Ted Danson	Becker
135	October 28	Wanda Sykes	Wanda at Large
136	October 29	Norm Macdonald	A Minute with Stan Hooper
137	October 30	Neal Pollack	Never Mind the Pollacks

=== November ===
2003 Ep. No.	Date	Guest	Promotion
138	November 3	Kyle MacLachlan	The Caretaker
139	November 4	Michael Beschloss	The Conquerors: Roosevelt, Truman and the Destruction of Hitler's Germany, 1941-1945 (ISBN 0-684-81027-1)
140	November 5	Bob Newhart	Elf
141	November 6	Colin Firth	Love Actually
142	November 10	Will Ferrell	Elf
143	November 11	Peter Dinklage	The Station Agent
144	November 12	Wyclef Jean	The Preacher's Son
145	November 13	Brendan Fraser	Looney Tunes: Back in Action
146	November 17	Heidi Klum	Victoria's Secret Fashion Show
147	November 18	Bernard Goldberg	Arrogance: Rescuing America From the Media Elite ISBN 0-446-53191-X
148	November 19	James Spader	The Practice
149	November 20	Billy Bob Thornton	Bad Santa
150	November 24	Who are the Daily Show? Special	N/A

=== December ===
2003 Ep. No	Date	Guest	Promotion
151	December 1	Adam Goldberg	The Hebrew Hammer
152	December 2	Sen. Tom Daschle	Like No Other Time (ISBN 1-4000-4955-5)
153	December 3	Sean Hannity, Alan Colmes	Hannity & Colmes
154	December 4	Alec Baldwin	The Cooler
155	December 8	Eva Mendes	Stuck On You
156	December 9	Steve Buscemi	Big Fish
157	December 10	Sen. Zell Miller	A National Party No More: The Conscience of a Conservative Democrat (ISBN 0-9745376-1-6)
158	December 11	Gen. Wesley Clark	Winning Modern Wars (ISBN 1-58648-218-1)
159	December 15	Maggie Gyllenhaal	Mona Lisa Smile
160	December 16	Ben Affleck	Paycheck
161	December 17	Julia Stiles	Mona Lisa Smile
162	December 18	Natalie Portman	Cold Mountain
