= Infamous Scribblers =

2006 nonfiction history book

Infamous Scribblers: The Founding Fathers and the Rowdy Beginnings of American Journalism
- 2007 cover
- Author: Eric Burns
- Language: English
- Subject: Journalism in the early US
- Genre: Nonfiction history
- Publisher: PublicAffairs
- Publication date: 2006
- Publication place: United States
- Pages: 467 (1st ed.)
- ISBN: 978-1-58648-334-0
- OCLC: 191695793
- Dewey Decimal: 071/.309033
- LC Class: PN4861 .B87 2006

Infamous Scribblers: The Founding Fathers and the Rowdy Beginnings of American Journalism is a book by Eric Burns, a journalist and historian, about the American press in the country's early history. The first edition of Infamous Scribblers was published in 2006. Another edition was printed in 2007.

== Background ==
When Infamous Scribblers was written and published, Eric Burns was a media critic and host of Fox News Watch on Fox News, having previously worked for NBC.

George Washington used the phrase "infamous scribblers" to describe the journalists of his day.

== Overview ==
The book describes the history of early American newspapers in the colonial period, the American Revolution, and the early Republic. Burns credits journalism for shaping the early country's ideals and politics. He argues that partisan reporting and sensationalism are very old practices in the American media: they originated in and were at their worst in the era he explores. Most of the book is about the history of the journalists themselves, narrated in a lively style, within which historical analysis is woven.

== Reception ==
The Claremont Review of Books called the book both entertaining and thoughtful. Reviewer Richard Brookhiser appreciated Burns's background as a journalist for helping him recognize and record important facts.

According to Roger Mellen writing for H-Net, Infamous Scribblers is a usable source that "does not quite meet the standards of a scholarly study". He noted the author's occasional unfamiliarity with the subject, which leads to factual errors, and problems with the book's sources. He also wrote that Burns, when he describes the early American news media as blatantly biased, fails to recognize nuances pointed out by other historians. Nevertheless, he praised the book's writing style, proclaiming Infamous Scribblers an "interesting and useful" book and a "pleasurable introduction" to the topic of early American journalism.

Publishers Weekly considered the book entertaining, mentioning the author's enthusiasm and the mixture of familiar and little-known stories, but also commented that Burns's assertions feel exaggerated at times.

The Boston Globe remarked that Burns is a "capable student", but repetitive anecdotes are "short on deep analysis".

Infamous Scribblers is "a quick, illuminating history", according to Kirkus Reviews, that suffers from a sometimes lacking style and problems in its use of quotes—ultimately "[i]mportant, informative, amusing, surprising and even cautionary", but it is "a pity it's not more gracefully told."

== See also ==
- History of American journalism
- History of American newspapers
- Eric Burns
