= Fox News Watch =

1997–2013 American TV news program

- Former logo of Fox News Watch
- Genre: Current events Debate show
- Presented by: Jon Scott
- Starring: Howard Kurtz; Jim Pinkerton; Cal Thomas; Ellis Henican; Judith Miller; Kirsten Powers
- Country of origin: United States
- Original language: English

Production
- Production location: New York City
- Camera setup: Multi-camera
- Running time: 60 minutes

Original release
- Network: Fox News Channel
- Release: 1997 – August 31, 2013

Fox News Watch was an Sunday morning show on Fox News Channel hosted by Jon Scott which discussed the week in review, mainly American media coverage of current events. The show ended on August 31, 2013. News Watch was then replaced by the hour-long news program, MediaBuzz.

== Format ==
Fox News Watch featured a panel composed of two conservatives and two liberals, moderated by Scott. Similar in premise to CNN's Reliable Sources, the panel discussed how the media portrayed certain news stories from the previous week. Panelists also discussed the overall condition of the American news media, such as the newspapers, cable news networks, broadcast networks, and other popular news outlets.

== Departures ==
On February 2, 2008, then-host Eric Burns announced that Neal Gabler had left the show to work for PBS. It was also announced that Jim Pinkerton had left the show to work for former Arkansas Governor Mike Huckabee.

Burns' contract was not renewed and expired in Spring 2008, reportedly saying in an interview that, "Fox News has told me that my contract will be terminated within the next 2 months, perhaps sooner. I was given no reason. It certainly has nothing to do with ratings; the last episode of Fox News Watch was the second highest-rated weekend show on all 3 cable news networks, and the program has almost been in the top 4 or 5. I have no theory, none, why they are getting rid of me. Although I heard rumors, I have never heard reasons." Fox News responded by saying Burns' contract was a contributor agreement rather than a talent agreement. Burns was replaced by Jon Scott.

The final Fox News Watch program aired on August 31, 2013, with Reliable Sources host Howard Kurtz moving to Fox News and the new show MediaBuzz.

== Personalities ==
=== Hosts ===
- Eric Breindel (1997–1998)
- Eric Burns (1998–2008)
- E. D. Hill (2008)
- Jon Scott (2008–2013)
- Rick Folbaum (2009–2013)

=== Panelists ===
- Alan Colmes
- Cal Thomas
- Rich Lowry
- Jim Pinkerton
- Judith Miller (2008–2013)
- Ellis Henican

=== Former panelists ===
- Neal Gabler (2002–2008)
- Laura Flanders (1997–1998)
- Jeff Cohen (1997–2002)
- Jane Hall (1997–2009)

== Reception and criticism ==
Left-wing media critics and bloggers argued that Fox News Watch perpetuated the myth of liberal bias in the mainstream media, while ignoring conservative bias by Fox News. Fox News Watch has been accused of ignoring or dismissing controversies concerning Fox News' parent company, News Corporation, such as when an outtake was leaked online showing the program's panelists refusing to discuss News Corp's phone hacking scandal. However, the issue was later discussed in-depth (and without further refusal) during a broadcast on July 16, 2011.
