= How Sex Works =

2009 non-fiction work by Sharon Moalem

How Sex Works Why We Look, Smell, Taste, Feel, and Act the Way We Do
- Author: Sharon Moalem
- Language: English
- Subject: Science
- Genre: Non-fiction
- Publisher: Harper
- Publication date: April 28, 2009
- Publication place: United States
- Media type: Hardback & paperback
- Pages: 288 pp (hardback edition)
- ISBN: 9780061479656 (hardback)
- Preceded by: Survival of the Sickest: The Surprising Connections Between Disease and Longevity

How Sex Works: Why We Look, Smell, Taste, Feel, and Act the Way We Do is a 2009 book by evolutionary biologist and New York Times bestselling author Sharon Moalem, published by HarperCollins. The book examines the scientific reasons people are attracted to one another, including the evolutionary underpinnings of sexual attraction, monogamy, and sexual orientation.

== Overview ==
How Sex Works uses evolutionary biology to explore human sexuality, and how sexuality can influence society in terms of human relations and belief systems. The author examines the physiological purpose behind how sensory data is interpreted by the human body and its effect on human sexuality. Moalem argues that menstruation, fertility, penis size, orgasm, ejaculation and contraception all have traces back to the "survival of the fittest" and the human desire to find a healthy partner for reproduction. The book covers other evolutionary factors influencing sexual attraction including pheremones, genetic makeup, immune system compatibility and ovulation.

The book uses various examples to illustrate the author's central point, including:

- Body scents are linked to strength of immune systems, signaling potential mates on the viability of producing healthy offspring.
- Brazilian waxes have become more desirable as our subconscious attempts to eradicate pubic lice.
- Men watching pornography which includes men in the scene (along with a woman) can lead to increased sperm production due to the perceived competition.
- Women are more likely to fantasize about men who are not their partners during ovulation, more likely to lead to fraternal twins.
- Men are attracted to women with low waist-to-hip ratio (hourglass shape) because fatty acids stored in hip fat aid brain development in fetuses and lead to smarter children.

== Criticism ==
Kirkus Reviews called the book "provocative and entertaining", describing it as "a volume stuffed with information that avoids getting bogged down in difficult medical terms or complex biological concepts."
