= List of The Daily Show episodes (2004) =

- No. of episodes: 161

Release
- Original network: Comedy Central

Season chronology
- ← Previous; 2003 episodes Next → 2005 episodes

This is a list of episodes for The Daily Show with Jon Stewart in 2004.

== 2004 ==
=== January ===
Date	Guest	Promotion
January 6	Tom Brokaw	A Long Way From Home
January 7	Elijah Wood	The Lord of the Rings: The Return of the King
January 8	Charlize Theron	Monster
January 12	Richard Lewis	Curb Your Enthusiasm
January 13	Catherine Weitz	NASA
January 14	Carol Moseley-Braun	Presidential candidate
January 15	Joe Biden	
January 19	Philip Seymour Hoffman	Along Came Polly
January 20	Jeff Garlin	Curb Your Enthusiasm
January 21	Sen. John McCain	None
January 22	Erika Christensen	The Perfect Score
January 26	Ken Auletta	None
January 27	Richard Perle	An End to Evil: How to Win the War on Terror (ISBN 1-4000-6194-6)
January 28	Christine Todd Whitman	
January 29	Kelsey Grammer	Frasier

=== February ===
Date	Guest	Promotion
February 2	Randy Jackson	American Idol; What's Up Dawg?: How to Become a Superstar in the Music Business (ISBN 1-4013-0774-4)
February 3	Donald Trump	The Apprentice
February 4	Bob Dole	None
February 5	Noah Wyle	ER
February 9	Charles Lewis	The Buying of the President 2004 (ISBN 0-06-054853-3)
February 10	Dave Chappelle	Chappelle's Show
February 11	Paul Rudd	Friends
February 12	Drew Barrymore	50 First Dates
February 23	Tyra Banks	America's Next Top Model
February 24	John Podhoretz	Bush Country
February 25	Norah Jones	Feels like Home
February 26	Samuel L. Jackson	Twisted

=== March ===
Date	Guest	Promotion
March 1	Edie Falco	The Sopranos
March 2	Mark Ebner	Hollywood, Interrupted: Insanity Chic in Babylon - The Case Against Celebrity (ISBN 0-471-70624-8)
March 3	Rudolph Giuliani	None
March 4	Willem Dafoe	The Reckoning
March 8	Val Kilmer	Spartan
March 9	Ed Gillespie	None
March 10	George Carlin	Jersey Girl
March 11	Paula Zahn	Paula Zahn Now
March 15	Sen. Charles Schumer	None
March 16	John Stossel	Give Me a Break: How I Exposed Hucksters, Cheats, and Scam Artists and Became the Scourge of the Liberal Media... (ISBN 0-06-052914-8)
March 17	Mekhi Phifer	Dawn of the Dead
March 18	Ethan Hawke	Taking Lives
March 22	Wynton Marsalis	
March 23	Tom Hanks	The Ladykillers
March 24	Jamie Foxx	Redemption: The Stan Tookie Williams Story
March 25	Al Franken	The O'Franken Factor (later renamed The Al Franken Show)
March 29	Jennifer Beals	The L Word
March 30	Richard A. Clarke	Against All Enemies: Inside America's War on Terror (ISBN 0-7432-6024-4)
March 31	Karen Hughes	Ten Minutes from Normal (ISBN 0-670-03305-7)

=== April ===
Date	Guest	Promotion
April 1	Johnny Knoxville	Walking Tall
April 5	Jerry Seinfeld	American Express commercials
April 6	Matthew Perry and Bruce Willis	The Whole Ten Yards
April 7	Tim Robbins	Embedded
April 8	Jason Bateman	Arrested Development
April 19	Melissa Etheridge	Lucky
April 20	Mark Ruffalo	13 Going on 30
April 21	John Gibson	Hating America: The New World Sport (ISBN 0-06-058010-0)
April 22	Arianna Huffington	Fanatics and Fools: The Game Plan for Winning Back America (ISBN 1-4013-5213-8)
April 26	Bob Kerrey	None
April 27	Rebecca Romijn	Godsend
April 28	Fareed Zakaria	The Future of Freedom: Illiberal Democracy at Home and Abroad (ISBN 0-393-04764-4)
April 29	Bob Woodward	Plan of Attack (ISBN 0-7432-5547-X)

=== May ===
Date	Guest	Promotion
May 3	Janeane Garofalo	The Majority Report
May 4	Joseph C. Wilson	The Politics of Truth: Inside the Lies that Led to War and Betrayed My Wife's CIA Identity: A Diplomat's Memoir (ISBN 0-7867-1378-X)
May 5	Kareem Abdul-Jabbar	Brothers In Arms: The Epic Story of the 761st Tank Battalion, WWII's Forgotten Heroes (ISBN 0-385-50338-5)
May 6	Andy Richter	New York Minute
May 10	Sen. John McCain	Why Courage Matters: The Way to a Braver Life (ISBN 1-4000-6030-3)
May 11	Tim Russert	Big Russ and Me: Father and Son—Lessons of Life (ISBN 1-4013-5208-1)
May 12	Ken Mehlman	None
May 13	William Kristol	None

=== June ===
Date	Guest	Promotion
June 1	David Cross	It's Not Funny
June 2	Thomas Friedman	None
June 3	Mario Cuomo	Why Lincoln Matters: Today More Than Ever (ISBN 0-15-100999-6)
June 7	Donna Brazile	None
June 8	David Brooks	
June 9	Morgan Spurlock	Super Size Me
June 10	Jennifer Love Hewitt	Garfield: The Movie
June 14	Stanley Tucci	The Terminal
June 15	Hassan Ibrahim	Al Jazeera
June 16	Robert Reich	
June 17	Graham Norton	The Graham Norton Effect
June 21	Stephen F. Hayes	The Connection: How al Qaeda's Collaboration with Saddam Hussein Has Endangered America (ISBN 0-06-074673-4)
June 22	Ashley Judd	De-Lovely
June 23	Kevin Kline	De-Lovely
June 24	Michael Moore	Fahrenheit 9/11
June 28	Terry McAuliffe	None
June 29	Edward Conlon	Blue Blood (ISBN 1-57322-266-6)
June 30	Calvin Trillin	Obliviously On He Sails: The Bush Administration in Rhyme (ISBN 1-4000-6288-8)

=== July ===
Date	Guest	Promotion
July 6	Ralph Nader (show hosted by Stephen Colbert)	The Good Fight: Declare Your Independence and Close the Democracy Gap (ISBN 0-06-075604-7); Presidential candidate
July 7	Will Ferrell	Anchorman: The Legend of Ron Burgundy
July 8	Christina Applegate	Anchorman: The Legend of Ron Burgundy
July 12	Wolf Blitzer	None
July 13	Michael Isikoff	None
July 14	Sarah Vowell	The Partly Cloudy Patriot
July 15	Sacha Baron Cohen	Da Ali G Show
July 27	Gov. Bill Richardson	2004 Democratic National Convention
July 28	Sen. Joe Biden	2004 Democratic National Convention
July 29	None	2004 Democratic National Convention
July 30	None	2004 Democratic National Convention

=== August ===
Date	Guest	Promotion
August 2	Rep. Henry Bonilla	None
August 3	Spike Lee	She Hate Me
August 4	Aaron Eckhart	Suspect Zero
August 5	Natalie Portman	Garden State
August 9	Bill Clinton	My Life (ISBN 0-375-41457-6)
August 10	Maureen Dowd	Bushworld: Enter at Your Own Risk (ISBN 0-399-15258-X)
August 11	Tom Cruise	Collateral
August 12	Bryan Keefer	None
August 17	Norm Coleman	None
August 18	Burt Reynolds	Without a Paddle
August 19	Seth Green	Without a Paddle
August 23	Robert Smith	None
August 24	John Kerry	Democratic Party Presidential candidate
August 25	Ed Gillespie	None
August 30	(None)	Special: Midway to the Election Spectacular
August 31	Ted Koppel	2004 Republican National Convention

=== September ===
Date	Guest	Promotion
September 1	Dan Bartlett	2004 Republican National Convention
September 2	Sen. John McCain	2004 Republican National Convention
September 3	Chris Matthews	2004 Republican National Convention
September 13	Drew Barrymore	The Best Place To Start
September 14	Pat Buchanan	Where the Right Went Wrong: How Neoconservatives Subverted the Reagan Revolution and Hijacked the Bush Presidency (ISBN 0-312-34115-6)
September 15	Alec Baldwin	The Last Shot
September 16	Gwyneth Paltrow	Sky Captain and the World of Tomorrow
September 21	Richard Clarke	Against All Enemies: Inside America's War on Terror (Paperback) (ISBN 0-7432-6045-7)
September 22	Gov. Marc Racicot	None
September 23	Matthew Broderick	The Last Shot
September 27	Rosie Perez	Reckless
September 28	Ralph Reed	Christian Coalition
September 29	Seymour Hersh	Chain of Command: The Road from 9/11 to Abu Ghraib
September 30	Wesley Clark, Rudolph Giuliani	(Post-debate commentary on the first presidential debate of 2004)

=== October ===
Date	Guest	Promotion
October 4	Bishop Desmond Tutu	None
October 5	Billy Bob Thornton	Friday Night Lights
October 6	Bob Schieffer	Moderator for the third presidential debate of 2004
October 7	Bill O'Reilly	None
October 18	Ed Koch	Eddie, Harold's Little Brother (ISBN 0-399-24210-4)
October 19	Marisa Tomei	Alfie
October 20	Fareed Zakaria	None
October 21	Billy Crudup	Stage Beauty
October 25	Madeleine Albright	None
October 26	Bob Kerrey	None
October 27	Jesse Jackson	None
October 28	John Zogby	None

=== November ===
Date	Guest	Promotion
November 1	Chris Wallace	Character: Profiles in Presidential Courage (ISBN 1-59071-038-X)
November 2	William Weld & Al Sharpton	None
November 3	Sen. Charles Schumer	None
November 4	William Kristol	None
November 9	Richard Branson	The Rebel Billionaire
November 10	Tom Wolfe	I Am Charlotte Simmons
November 11	Kenneth Pollack	The Persian Puzzle: The Conflict Between Iran and American (ISBN 1400063159
November 15	Kay Bailey Hutchison	American Heroines: The Spirited Women Who Shaped Our Country (ISBN 0-06-056635-3)
November 16	Tom Brokaw	None
November 17	Thomas Frank	What's the Matter with Kansas? (ISBN 0-8050-7339-6)
November 18	Woody Harrelson	After the Sunset
November 29	Jude Law	Closer
November 30	Brian Williams	Stewart: "Heir to the NBC throne"

=== December ===
Date	Guest	Promotion
December 1	Christopher Hitchens	Love, Poverty, and War: Journeys and Essays (ISBN 1-56025-580-3)
December 2	Stephen King	Faithful: Two Diehard Boston Red Sox Fans Chronicle the Historic 2004 Season (ISBN 0-7432-6752-4)
December 6	Isabella Rossellini	Legend of Earthsea on Sci Fi Channel
December 7	Paul O'Neill	None
December 8	Seth Mnookin	Hard News : The Scandals at The New York Times and Their Meaning for American Media (ISBN 1-4000-6244-6)
December 9	Kate Bosworth	Beyond the Sea
December 13	Kevin Spacey	Beyond the Sea
December 14	Dore Gold	Tower of Babble: How the United Nations Has Fueled Global Chaos (ISBN 1-4000-5475-3)
December 15	Billy Connolly	Lemony Snicket's A Series of Unfortunate Events
December 16	Katie Couric	The Blue Ribbon Day (ISBN 0-385-50142-0)
