= Jane Hall (journalist) =

- Born: Abilene, Texas, U.S.
- Education: University of Texas at Austin (BA in English), Columbia University Graduate School of Journalism (MA)
- Occupations: Journalist, media commentator, academic
- Employer(s): Fox News Channel (until 2009), American University
- Known for: Fox News Watch, The O'Reilly Factor, Reliable Sources, The American Forum

Jane Hall is an American journalist and academic. She was one of four regular pundits on the Fox News Channel program Fox News Watch and frequently appeared on The O'Reilly Factor, usually having clashes with the host. She was a Fox News Channel contributor. She left Fox News in 2009.

Hall is also an associate professor in the School of Communication at American University.

Hall also has been editor-in-chief of the business magazine View, a staff writer at TV Guide and an associate editor at People magazine. She has published articles for Columbia Journalism Review and The Harvard Journal of Press and Politics.

Hall is interviewed frequently on TV and radio, including The NewsHour with Jim Lehrer, Charlie Rose, CBS This Morning and National Public Radio. She has moderated panels on issues in journalism at Columbia University and the Center for Communications in New York.. Hall is frequently on CNN's media show, "Reliable Sources," and is the moderator of The American Forum series on WAMU, the NPR station in Washington DC.

Hall is a native of Abilene, Texas. She attended Mills College in Oakland, California, and received a Bachelor of Arts degree in English from the University of Texas at Austin. She is a member of Phi Beta Kappa and also holds a master's degree in journalism from the Columbia University Graduate School of Journalism in New York City.
