= Michael Beschloss =

American historian and author

- Beschloss in 2026 at Politics and Prose
- Born: Michael Richard Beschloss; November 30, 1955 (age 70); Chicago, Illinois, U.S.
- Education: Williams College (BA); Harvard University (MBA)
- Occupation: Historian
- Spouse: Afsaneh Mashayekhi
- Children: 2
- Writing career
- Subject: United States presidency

Michael Richard Beschloss (born November 30, 1955) is an American historian specializing in the United States presidency. He is the author of nine books on the presidency.

== Early life ==
Beschloss was born in Chicago, grew up in Flossmoor, Illinois which is south of Chicago, to Ruth and Morris Beschloss, who was a Jewish refugee from Nazi Germany. Beschloss was a student at Eaglebrook School in Deerfield, Massachusetts; Phillips Academy in Andover, Massachusetts; Williams College in Williamstown, Massachusetts; and Harvard University. He majored in political science, studying under James MacGregor Burns at Williams College from which he graduated with Highest Honors, and earned an MBA at Harvard Business School, originally intending to write about history while he held a position as an executive at a foundation.

== Career ==
Beschloss has been a frequent commentator on the PBS NewsHour and is an NBC News presidential historian. He is a trustee of the White House Historical Association and the National Archives Foundation. He sits on the board of the Smithsonian's National Museum of American History and has been a trustee of the Thomas Jefferson Foundation (Monticello), the Urban Institute, the University of Virginia's Miller Center of Public Affairs and the PEN/Faulkner Foundation.

He also sat on the advisory board to the Abraham Lincoln Bicentennial Commission and was a member of the President's Commission on White House Fellowships. He held appointments in history at the Smithsonian Institution, as a senior associate member at St. Antony's College (University of Oxford), a visiting scholar at the Harvard University Russian Research Center, a Senior Fellow of the Annenberg Foundation, and a Montgomery Fellow and Dorsett Fellow at Dartmouth College. Since 2014, he has been chair of the annual Robert F. Kennedy Book Awards. He has appeared on The Daily Show in 2003, 2005, 2006, 2007, and 2010. He was portrayed by Chris Kattan on NBC's Saturday Night Live on February 14, 1998.

Beschloss has had a X account, @BeschlossDC, since October 2012. Time included his account in their "Best Twitter Feeds of 2013". He has contributed columns on history with the title HistorySource to The New York Times. He is also the editor of Washington by Meg Greenfield (2001) and Essays in Honor of James MacGregor Burns (with Thomas Cronin) in 1988.

== Awards ==
Beschloss received a 2005 News and Documentary Emmy Award for being the host of Discovery Channel's Decisions That Shook the World, the category was "Outstanding Individual Achievement in a Craft: Research". He has received the Williams College Bicentennial Medal, Illinois' Order of Lincoln (the state's highest honor), the Harry S. Truman Public Service Award, the Ambassador Book Award, the Rutgers University Living History Award, the New York State Archives History Award, the Founders Award of the Historical Society of Pennsylvania, and the Phillips Academy Andover Alumni Award of Distinction. He has received honorary doctorates from Lafayette College, Williams College, St. Mary's College of Maryland, Saint Peter's College, Governors State University and Allegheny College.

Beschloss was inducted as a Laureate of The Lincoln Academy of Illinois and awarded the Order of Lincoln (the state's highest honor) by the governor in 2004 in the area of Communications and Education. In October 2022, Beschloss received the National Archives' annual Records of Achievement Award. In 2019, he received The Lincoln Forum's Richard Nelson Current Award of Achievement.

== Personal life ==
He has two sons with his Iranian-born wife Afsaneh Mashayekhi Beschloss. Afsaneh is president and CEO of the Rock Creek Group, a Washington D.C. investment firm. They are advisory board members of Resources for Inner City Children. Beschloss' brother Steven is also a writer and journalist.

== Bibliography ==
- Kennedy and Roosevelt: The Uneasy Alliance (1980); started as Beschloss's senior honors thesis at Williams College
- Mayday: Eisenhower, Khrushchev and the U-2 Affair (1986)
- Eisenhower: A Centennial Life (1990)
- The Crisis Years: Kennedy and Khrushchev, 1960–1963 (1991)
- The Conquerors: Roosevelt, Truman and the Destruction of Hitler's Germany, 1941–1945 (2002)
- Presidential Courage: Brave Leaders and How They Changed America, 1789–1989 (2007)
- Presidents of War: The Epic Story, from 1807 to Modern Times (2018)

Co-authored books

- At the Highest Levels: The Inside Story of the End of the Cold War (1993); with Strobe Talbott.

Edited Books

- Taking Charge: The Johnson White House Tapes, 1963–1964 (1997)
- Reaching for Glory: Lyndon Johnson's Secret White House Tapes, 1964–1965 (2001),

Edited transcriptions of Lyndon B. Johnson's conversations, as captured by his taping system, with historical annotation and commentary. A third Johnson volume is forthcoming.

- Jacqueline Kennedy: Historic Conversations on Life with John F. Kennedy (2011)

== Reception ==
President Bill Clinton told People in December 1997 that the first audiobook he ever listened to was Taking Charge by Michael Beschloss. In Bob Woodward's Plan of Attack, President George W. Bush is quoted as telling the author Elie Wiesel in February 2003, "I read your views on Auschwitz in Michael Beschloss' book", referring to The Conquerors. Bush refers to Beschloss' book Presidential Courage in his 2010 memoir Decision Points.

John Frankenheimer's last film, Path to War (HBO, 2002), starring Donald Sutherland and Michael Gambon, was based in part on Beschloss' two books about Lyndon B. Johnson.
