= Do Not Ask What Good We Do =

2012 book by Robert Draper

Do Not Ask What Good We Do: Inside the U.S. House of Representatives
- Cover of Do Not Ask What Good We Do
- Author: Robert Draper
- Language: English
- Publisher: Free Press
- Publication date: April 24, 2012
- Publication place: United States
- Pages: 352
- ISBN: 978-1451642087

Do Not Ask What Good We Do: Inside the U.S. House of Representatives is a 2012 book by the author Robert Draper and published by Free Press. It details the activities of Republicans and Democrats in the United States House of Representatives and the Senate during the first term of Barack Obama's presidency. The book was republished under the title When the Tea Party Came to Town.

== Background ==
In order to research the activities and politics within the House of Representatives, Draper "embedded with new and senior House members" that had been elected in the 2010 election. A majority of those he spoke with and listened to were Republicans, especially among the 87 new legislators.

The title of the book, Do Not Ask What Good We Do, is taken from a sentence in a letter from Fisher Ames to Thomas Dwight, dated May 30, 1796: "Do not ask what good we do : that is not a fair question, in these days of faction."

== Content ==
=== Republicans ===
The prologue to the book details how, on the night of Obama's inauguration, a group of around 15 Republican Representatives and Senators met in the Caucus Room, a "high-end D.C. establishment", to discuss methods to "win back political power" and to "put the brakes on Obama's legislative platform". Those attending the meeting included Eric Cantor, Jeb Hensarling, Pete Hoekstra, Dan Lungren, Kevin McCarthy, Paul Ryan, and Pete Sessions as the House Representatives and Tom Coburn, Bob Corker, Jim DeMint, John Ensign, and Jon Kyl from the Senate. Newt Gingrich and Frank Luntz, both "non-lawmakers," were also in attendance. Luntz was the organizer of the meeting.

Multiple suggestions were put forward on how to direct their focus, with Kyl suggesting the group go after "Timothy Geithner for failing to pay Social Security and Medicare taxes while at the International Monetary Fund". In the same vein, Gingrich pointed out that "Charlie Rangel had a similar tax problem." Draper quotes in his book the four points that were decided upon in the meeting. The first was for Kyl to focus on Geithner, the second was to oppose any economic policies put forth by Obama, the third was to utilize attack ads against "vulnerable Democrats" on radio and television, and the fourth and final decision was to form a majority in the House in 2010 and the Senate and presidency in 2012.

From an interview with Representative Renee Ellmers, Draper discussed how the new "freshman" class of House Republicans from the 2010 midterm election caused a significant amount of conflict between themselves and party leaders, such as House Speaker John Boehner. Some of the Republican leaders even "feared the divisiveness could lead to mutiny" within the party.

=== Democrats ===
The book quotes former Representative Anthony Weiner from September 2009 about advising Obama on Medicare and suggesting that the Affordable Care Act should be presented as an expansion of the already existing single payer system. Juliet Lapidos of The New York Times noted that this might have worked better than Obama's other attempts to expand Medicare, as it would have merely been adding to the already existing healthcare structure. Furthermore, the public has stated since in polls that certain provisions of the Affordable Care Act are agreeable.

Draper discusses how, in July 2011, when Obama was seeking a "grand bargain" that included tax increases and other benefits in order to obtain Republican agreement, a number of Democrats became opposed to the idea. Led by Nancy Pelosi, a group of House Democrats had a closed caucus meeting where it was decided that they would oppose any attempt to cut Medicare and Social Security, even if the bill was put forward by Obama. However, the idea of a bargain died before coming to a vote.

== Critical reception ==
Michael Crowley for The New York Times described the book as an "engaging and often funny chronicle of the year in the House of Representatives following the Tea Party-powered 2010 elections." Jim Cullen of History News Network noted that the book was written "in the vein of [a] Bob Woodward instant, insider history", but adds that, since the subject of the book is the gridlock in Congress where nothing ends up happening, the book becomes a "competent if not especially riveting reading" because of the subject itself.
