= Robert Draper =

American journalist (born 1959)

- Draper in 2026 at Politics and Prose
- Born: November 15, 1959 (age 66)
- Education: University of Texas at Austin
- Occupations: Journalist, author
- Spouse(s): Kirsten Powers (engaged, 2016)
- Writing career
- Genre: Non-fiction
- Notable works: Dead Certain: The Presidency of George W. Bush; Do Not Ask What Good We Do: Inside the U.S. House of Representatives

Robert Draper (born November 15, 1959) is an American journalist, and author of Do Not Ask What Good We Do: Inside the U.S. House of Representatives. He is a journalist at The New York Times. Previously, he worked for Texas Monthly and GQ.

== Background and education ==
Draper attended Westchester High School in Houston, Texas. He is the grandson of Leon Jaworski, who served as a special prosecutor during the Watergate scandal. Draper was active in high school debate. He attended the University of Texas at Austin where he majored in the Plan II Honors program and wrote for the university newspaper The Daily Texan.

== Career ==
=== Journalism career ===
After graduation from the University of Texas at Austin, Draper wrote for the Austin Chronicle.

In 1991, Draper joined the staff of the Texas Monthly where he worked along with Gregory Curtis, Jim Shahin, Joe Nick Patoski, Gary Cartwright, Evan Smith and the periodical publisher Michael Levy. In July 1992, Draper publishes his interview in Texas Monthly on Cormac McCarthy, who at that time became known for his novel All the Pretty Horses. In September 1996, Draper had relocated to Venice where he worked for four months for the Hadrian's Walls.

He was an editor of GQ magazine.

In 2007, Draper became a contributing writer to National Geographic and in 2008 joined The New York Times Magazine. As a writer for The New York Times, Draper had an exclusive interview with Wendy Davis, prior to her even becoming a politician. He moved to a staff position at the Times in 2022.

As a journalist and editor he had met many known people, including novelists such as Stephen Harrigan, Mary Karr and Carol Dawson.

In 2019, Draper and Cédric Gerbehaye, a Belgian photographer, had traveled to Bolivia, to write about lithium.

=== Writing career ===
Draper's career as a writer dates back to 1990 when he wrote his first novel Armbrister. Back then, Kathy Robbins was his literary agent, who promised to find him a publisher, but failed to do so. During the same year. Draper had written Rolling Stone Magazine: The Uncensored History, which was read by Julia Null, wife of Evan Smith, and was published by Doubleday the same year. In 1994, Draper moved to Palacios, Texas for three months, where he wrote another novel, Under Mistletoe which, just like his Armbrister didn't get published.

Draper's literary success became apparent when he became an author of Dead Certain: The Presidency of George W. Bush, a chronicle of the Bush administration from 2001 to 2007. The New York Times reviewed the book, writing that it gives "the reader an intimate sense of the president’s personality and how it informs his decision making." He has also written a novel Hadrian's Walls, published in 1999, which The New York Times called "deft and occasionally ingenious."

In April 2012, Draper published Do Not Ask What Good We Do: Inside the U.S. House of Representatives, which the Huffington Post described as "much-discussed and heavily-reported." Writing in the Wall Street Journal, ABC News senior political correspondent Jonathan Karl called the book "a refreshingly balanced account that captures the drama of one of Congress's most combative and maddeningly frustrating years in memory."

== Personal life ==
Draper was married to Meg Littleton in the late 1990s and early 2000s.

On November 16, 2016, fellow journalist Kirsten Powers announced her engagement to Draper.

== Bibliography ==
=== Books ===
- Draper, Robert (1990). Rolling Stone Magazine: The Uncensored History. New York: Doubleday. ISBN 9780385260602.
- Hadrian's walls, Knopf, 1999, ISBN 9780375403699
- Draper, Robert (2008). Dead Certain: The Presidency of George W. Bush. Free Press. ISBN 978-0-7432-7729-7.
- Draper, Robert (2012). Do Not Ask What Good We Do: Inside the U.S. House of Representatives. Free Press. ISBN 978-1-4516-4208-7. 331 p.
- Draper, Robert (2013). When the Tea Party Came to Town: Inside the U.S. House of Representatives' Most Combative, Dysfunctional, and Infuriating Term in Modern History. Simon & Schuster. ISBN 978-1-4516-4209-4. 352 p.
- Draper, Robert; Yader, David (2015). Pope Francis and the New Vatican. National Geographic. ISBN 978-1-4262-1582-7. 246 p.
- Draper, Robert (2020). To Start a War: How the Bush Administration Took America into Iraq. Penguin Press. ISBN 978-0-5255-6104-0. 496 p.
- Draper, Robert (2022). Weapons of Mass Delusion: When the Republican Party Lost Its Mind. Penguin Press. ISBN 978-0-5933-0014-5. 400 p.

=== Essays and reporting ===
- Draper, Robert (March 21, 2016). "The go-between: the Mexican actress who dazzled El Chapo". A Reporter at Large. The New Yorker. Vol. 92, no. 6. pp. 66–75. Kate del Castillo.
- Draper, Robert (December 29, 2025). "'I Was Just So Naïve': Inside Marjorie Taylor Greene's Break With Trump". The New York Times Magazine.
