= Dead Certain =

Book by Robert Draper

- Author: Robert Draper
- Language: English
- Publisher: Free Press
- Publication date: Sep 4, 2007
- Publication place: United States
- Media type: Hardcover
- Pages: 480
- ISBN: 0-7432-7728-7
- OCLC: 145379548
- Dewey Decimal: 973.931092 22
- LC Class: E902 .D73 2007

Dead Certain: The Presidency of George W. Bush is a 2007 book by Robert Draper. The book tells the story of the George W. Bush administration from 2001 to 2007.

Draper wanted to tell the story of the Bush White House with an inside perspective. To this end, and in preparation for writing the book, Draper had six one-on-one interviews with President Bush. He also personally interviewed Laura Bush, Dick Cheney, Donald Rumsfeld, Condoleezza Rice, Karl Rove, and about 200 other individuals.

Quote from Jon Stewart on The Daily Show regarding the book in an appearance by Robert Draper on September 12, 2007:

"It is the most unvarnished, natural, seemingly unaffected view of this President. Uh, he was either disarmed by you, or didn't think you were writing this stuff down.

Quote from Roger Ebert on Bush's plans after the presidency:

"President George W. Bush confided [in Draper] some of his plans for retirement. Bush told Draper: "I'll give some speeches to replenish the ol' coffers – I don't know what my dad gets; it's more than $50,000-$75,000 per speech – Clinton's making a lot of money." In another interview, Bush noted Clinton's recent work with the U.N. and said that after he retired, "You won't catch me hanging around the U.N."
