= Survival of the Sickest (book) =

2007 book by Sharon Moalem

Survival of the Sickest: The Surprising Connections Between Disease and Longevity
- Author: Sharon Moalem; Peter Satonick
- Original title: Survival of the Sickest: A Medical Maverick Discovers Why We Need Disease
- Language: English
- Subject: Science
- Genre: Non-fiction
- Published: February 6, 2007; William Morrow
- Publication place: United States
- Media type: Hardback & Paperback
- Pages: 288 pp (hardback edition)
- ISBN: 0-06-088965-9 (Hardback)
- Followed by: How Sex Works: Why We Look, Smell, Taste, Feel, and Act the Way We Do

Survival of the Sickest: The Surprising Connections Between Disease and Longevity is a 2007 New York Times Bestselling science book by Sharon Moalem, an evolutionary biologist and neurogeneticist, and Jonathan Prince, senior advisor and speechwriter for the Clinton administration. It was originally titled, Survival of the Sickest: A Medical Maverick Discovers Why We Need Disease.

== Overview ==
The book is a collection of case studies, which use scientific and historical data to support the individual proposed hypotheses, and the overall argument for a connection between some illnesses and increased longevity. Or, how many of the medical conditions that are diseases were the result of evolutionary changes that gave our ancestors a "leg up in the survival sweepstakes."

It contains 266 pages all leading up to part 3.

- Chapter 1: Hemochromatosis, bloodletting, and human iron consumption
- Chapter 2: Diabetes, climate change, and brown fat
- Chapter 3: Sunlight, vitamin D, cholesterol, and the physiological makeup of race
- Chapter 4: Vegetables, fava beans, and the spread of malaria
- Chapter 5: The virulence of bacteria, Guinea worms, and parasitic diseases
- Chapter 6: Mutating DNA and “jumping” genes
- Chapter 7: Genetic suppression and childhood obesity
- Chapter 8: Cancer cells and childbirth

Moalem includes an introduction in which he describes how and why he became interested in the medical sciences. The 2008 paperback edition contains a section entitled "P.S. Insights, Interviews, & More...". Moalem includes recommendations of related books.

== Reception ==
Survival of the Sickest debuted on the New York Times' bestselling book list and was featured on NBC's Today Show, Comedy Central's The Daily Show with Jon Stewart, and NPR's The Diane Rehm Show.
