= Eric Burns =

American historian

- Born: August 29, 1945 (age 81); Ambridge, Pennsylvania
- Education: Westminster College
- Occupations: Broadcast journalist, author

Eric Burns (born August 29, 1945) is an American author, playwright, media critic, and former broadcast journalist.

== Early life ==
Burns was born and raised in Ambridge, Pennsylvania, a small steel town approximately 15 miles northwest of Pittsburgh on the Ohio River. He is a graduate of Ambridge Area High School and of Westminster College in Pennsylvania.

== Television career ==
Burns began his television career at WQED, the PBS station in Pittsburgh, hosting a cultural affairs program in the studio adjacent to the studio in which Mister Rogers' Neighborhood was produced. Burns and Rogers went on to develop a close friendship, with the latter becoming a kind of mentor to the former. When Rogers died, the obituary that Burns broadcast stated that "no one has ever put television to nobler, more societally beneficial use than Fred Rogers."

After Pittsburgh, Burns went on to make stops in Parkersburg, West Virginia, where he was an anchorman and news director; and Minneapolis, where he was a reporter and anchorman. His work in Minneapolis caught the attention of NBC News executives in New York, and after a year and a half at station KMSP, Burns was hired as a national correspondent for NBC in 1976. Assigned first to the network's Chicago bureau, he was then moved to New York, with occasional overseas postings in Europe and northern Africa. He appeared regularly on NBC Nightly News and on Today.

Burns was fired in 2008 after 10 years of hosting Fox News Watch on the Fox News Channel. The New York Times said Burns acted as "the ringmaster for a relatively even-handed roundtable discussion about the media." Vanity Fair magazine once called Fox News Watch one of only two programs on the network worth watching.

On March 9, 2015, Eric, as a former Fox News Watch host, told CNN's Brian Stelter, “I’m saying that the people who watch Fox News are cult-ish," and that because of "their audience loyalty, ... O’Reilly, as the head of the cult, is not held to the same standards as Brian Williams.”

== Literary career ==
Burns is an author who has written fifteen books, two of which won the highest award given by the American Library Association for volumes published by a university press. Named as the "Best of the Best" were The Spirits of America: A Social History of Alcohol, and its companion-piece, The Smoke of the Gods: A Social History of Tobacco. Burns is the only non-academic ever to win the award twice.

Those two books, and his biggest-seller, Infamous Scribblers: The Founding Fathers and the Rowdy Beginnings of American Journalism, which was a selection of both the Book of the Month Club and the History Book Club, are among five of Burns's book to have been "adopted" by various college curricula for courses in journalism, American history, and American Studies. Infamous Scribblers is considered the definitive work on journalism during the colonial era. (Burns appeared on "The Daily Show" to promote" Infamous Scribblers. The interview is available by Googling "Jon Stewart/Eric Burns.)

More recently, Burns published "1920": The Year That Made the Decade Roar." It was named by Kirkus one of the best non-fiction books of 2015.

Burns has also written for a number of magazines, including Reader's Digest, The Weekly Standard, Family Circle, Spy, and the pre-Rupert Murdoch version of TV Guide. In addition, he has written for the Los Angeles Times, New York Post, and The Huffington Post, among other print outlets.

Burns is also a playwright. His first play, Mid-Strut opened in February 2012 at the Pittsburgh Playhouse, attracting three weeks of sold-out audiences and a favorable NPR review.

== Recognition ==
- Recipient of two Emmy Awards, one for a feature story he did for his segment on NBC's The Today Show, and the other for media criticism.

In the February, 1984 issue of the Washington Journalism Review (since become the American Journalism Review), Burns was cited as one of the best writers in the history of broadcast journalism, joining such luminaries as Edward R. Murrow, Charles Kuralt and David Brinkley. He was the youngest person so named to the honor.

- His script on the 50th anniversary of Charles Lindbergh's solo crossing of the Atlantic was reprinted in the first few editions of the journalism text Writing News for Broadcast, published by the Columbia University Press. "Burns writes with style," said author Charles Bliss Jr. "You know an artist is at work from the first line."
- The Spirits of America: A Social History of Alcohol was named one of the best academic press books of 2003 by the American Library Association. The Smoke of the Gods: A Social History of Tobacco won the same award in 2007.
- "1920: The Year That Made the Decade Roar" was named by Kirkus one of the best non-fiction books of 2015.
- In March 2015, C-SPAN devoted three hours to a program called "In-Depth With Eric Burns," an interview about his entire literary life. It is available online.

== Bibliography ==
- Broadcast Blues: Dispatches from the Twenty-Year War Between a Television Reporter and His Medium. New York: HarperCollins. 1993. ISBN 0060190329.
- The Joy of Books: Confessions of a Lifelong Reader. Amherst, N.Y.: Prometheus Books. 1995. ISBN 1573920045.
- The Autograph: A Modern Fable of a Father and Daughter. Illustrated by Diane Hays. Amherst, N.Y.: Prometheus Books. 1997. ISBN 157392167X.
- The Spirits of America: A Social History of Alcohol. Philadelphia: Temple University Press. 2004. ISBN 1592132146.
- Infamous Scribblers: The Founding Fathers and the Rowdy Beginnings of American Journalism. New York: PublicAffairs. 2006. ISBN 9781586483340.
- The Smoke of the Gods: A Social History of Tobacco. Philadelphia: Temple University Press. 2007. ISBN 978-1592134809.
- Virtue, Valor and Vanity: The Founding Fathers and the Pursuit of Fame. New York: Arcade Publishing. 2007. ISBN 9781559708586.
- All the News Unfit to Print: How Things Were... and How They Were Reported. Hoboken, N.J.: John Wiley & Sons. 2009. ISBN 9780470405239.
- Invasion of the Mind Snatchers: Television's Conquest of America in the Fifties. Philadelphia: Temple University Press. 2010. ISBN 9781439902882.
- 1920: The Year That Made the Decade Roar. New York: Pegasus Books. 2015. ISBN 9781605987729.
- The Golden Lad: The Haunting Story of Quentin and Theodore Roosevelt. New York: Pegasus Books. 2016. ISBN 9781605989518.
- Someone to Watch over Me: A Portrait of Eleanor Roosevelt and the Tortured Father Who Shaped Her Life. New York: Pegasus Books. 2017. ISBN 9781681773285.
- Mid-Strut: A Novel. AuthorHouse: Bloomington, Indiana. 2018. ISBN 9781546234654
- The Politics of Fame. Rutgers University Press: New Brunswick, N.J. 2018. ISBN 9781978800618
- 1957: The Year that Launched the American Future. Lanham, Maryland: Rowman & Littlefield. 2020. ISBN 978-1-5381-3995-0.
