= Kirsten Powers =

American author and columnist (born 1967)

- Born: Kirsten Anne Powers; December 14, 1967 (age 58)
- Education: University of Maryland
- Occupations: Columnist and political analyst
- Political party: Democratic
- Spouse: Robert Draper

Kirsten Anne Powers (born December 14, 1967) is an American author, liberal columnist and political analyst. She has been a columnist for USA Today and a political analyst at CNN and Fox News. The Washington Post called her "bright-eyed, sharp-tongued, [and] gamely combative."

Prior to joining CNN in 2016, Powers worked at Fox News as a political analyst and contributor, where she appeared regularly across the channel as a liberal journalist. Powers was previously a columnist for the New York Post, and later The Daily Beast, which she left to join USA Today.

Powers began her career as a staff assistant with the Clinton-Gore presidential transition team in 1992, followed by an appointment as Deputy Assistant U.S. Trade Representative for Public Affairs in the Clinton administration from 1993 to 1998. She subsequently worked in various roles, including press secretary, communications consultant and party consultant.

== Early life and education ==
Powers' parents were archaeologists, with Irish-American heritage. She credits her interest in politics and debate with being "expected to state and defend my positions on the issues of the day every night at dinner".

She graduated from Monroe Catholic High School in Fairbanks, Alaska, in 1986 and the University of Maryland and attended Georgetown University Law Center for a year and a half.

== Career ==
Powers served in the Clinton administration as the deputy assistant U.S. trade representative for public affairs.

She left to become the vice president for international communications at America Online. After AOL's merger with Time Warner, she became a vice president at the AOL-Time Warner Foundation.

Powers has worked in New York State Democratic politics for many years. She was a consultant of the New York State Democratic Committee, the press secretary for the Andrew Cuomo for Governor campaign, and communications director on the mayoral campaign of C. Virginia Fields. She also worked on the "Vote No on 3" campaign, which overwhelmingly defeated New York City Mayor Michael Bloomberg's ballot initiative to eliminate party primaries. Powers also was press secretary for Donnie Fowler's unsuccessful bid to be Democratic National Committee (DNC) chair. She has consulted for a variety of non-profit organizations, including Human Rights First and the National Council for Research on Women (NCRW).

In 2015, she authored The Silencing: How the Left is Killing Free Speech, which was published by Regnery Press.

In July 2017, Powers criticized CNN's decision to not identify a controversial Reddit user, asking in a USA Today article: "What about the people he routinely dehumanizes and degrades online?" But, she wrote, she ultimately supported CNN's decision to not identify the user because they determined his safety might have been jeopardized. Powers also wrote on Twitter that "people do not have a 'right' to stay anonymous so they can spew their racist, misogynist, homophobic garbage".

In January 2019 Powers was criticized and, in her own words, "harassed" on Twitter, after she blamed Covington Catholic High School students for "disrespecting an Indigenous elder" during a highly publicized confrontation that occurred at the Lincoln Memorial on January 18, 2019. The following month she wrote a column for USA Today in which she said: "I recently took a hiatus from social media to reflect on what role I might be playing in our increasingly toxic public square. I was not proud of what I found."

In July 2023, she announced that she was leaving her position as a political analyst with CNN after seven years with the network.

== Political positions ==
Powers supports universal health care. Thus, she initially supported President Barack Obama's health care reform, but later became critical of its implementation. She later opined: "A lot of people who have really been screwed over by the law [and] are left without insurance or with extremely expensive insurance", and agreed with a Ron Fournier headline in National Journal, "Why I'm getting tired of defending Obamacare."

In 2009, Powers urged the Obama administration to repeal "Don't ask, don't tell" as "refusing the service of people like Lt. Daniel Choi[...]an Arabic linguist — a specialty in enormously short supply — who deployed to Iraq and was willing to deploy again" harmed national security. A year earlier, she had accused the Republican Party of using homophobia for political gain.

Powers opposed the Fairness Doctrine, and a constitutional amendment to ban flag burning. She also supports comprehensive immigration reform and providing a path to citizenship for illegal aliens, and favors gun control. She also supports closing Guantanamo Bay, and transferring its prisoners to federal prisons.

In 2011, Powers criticized Americans' lack of concern about the Muslim Brotherhood rising to power in Egypt as "naivete". Her concern partly derived from her then-husband Marty Makary being of Coptic origin.

Powers described her ideal foreign policy as one of limited engagement, in which the U.S. refrained from intervening in tenuous situations it may not be able to control, or even understand. She even went on to state that she is not an isolationist. Powers was critical of Obama's foreign policy, going so far as to say to Bill O'Reilly: "Yeah, he should have given it [the Nobel Peace prize] back a long time ago, actually. But, you know, for the drone war, for the escalating the war in Afghanistan, having all these people die unnecessarily, plenty of civilians have been killed by his drone war, including children." In a separate interview she further stated, "I've been so disappointed with Obama on his foreign policy, and it's compounded with the way the national Democrats have enabled it, especially after the way they behaved about Bush. It's more like institutional Democrats, who have rallied around assassinating an American citizen, Anwar al-Awlaki, the drone war, escalating the war in Afghanistan, which is a complete disaster, the civil liberties — things that if Bush were doing them, everybody would be hysterical. To me it's shown that they're not that serious about human rights and issues they've been aligned with."

Powers has written opinion pieces against elective late-term abortions. However, in May 2019, she expressed regret for writing those pieces. She clarified that "[d]octors, not the government, should be helping women decide what to do in these situations", such as pregnancies that endanger the woman's life. She added that she "care[s] about all lives, and that includes the lives of women contemplating abortion".

In February 2019, Powers publicly apologized for having been "too judgmental and condemning" in her statements on social media and in the press. She stated that, when criticizing others for poor behavior, she had not properly acknowledged "the humanity of everyone involved". She stated, "People should not be treated as disposable and banished in perpetuity with no path to restoration with society." She also apologized for the tone of her 2015 book The Silencing: How the Left is Killing Free Speech, writing that it was "too dismissive of real concerns by traumatized people and groups who feel marginalized and ignored".

== Personal life ==
Powers was raised as an Episcopalian but spent much of her early adult life as an atheist. In her mid-30s, she became an evangelical Christian. The process of conversion began when she dated a Christian man, who introduced her to the Redeemer Presbyterian Church in New York City and the teachings of its pastor, Tim Keller, and culminated in an experience on a trip to Taiwan in 2006, where she later wrote she "woke up in what felt like a strange cross between a dream and reality. Jesus came to me and said, 'Here I am.'"

Powers has called her conversion "a bit of a mind bender" due to her political beliefs and former atheism, and prefers the term "orthodox Christian" over "evangelical" to describe herself, given the cultural baggage around the latter term. She has said that the biggest impact her new-found faith had on her political beliefs was that she came to "view everyone as God's child, and that means everyone deserves grace and respect".

On October 10, 2015, Powers was received into the Catholic Church.

On November 16, 2016, Powers announced her engagement to fellow journalist Robert Draper. They have since purchased land near Lecce, Italy, and relocated to southern Italy.
