= Sharon Moalem =

American geneticist

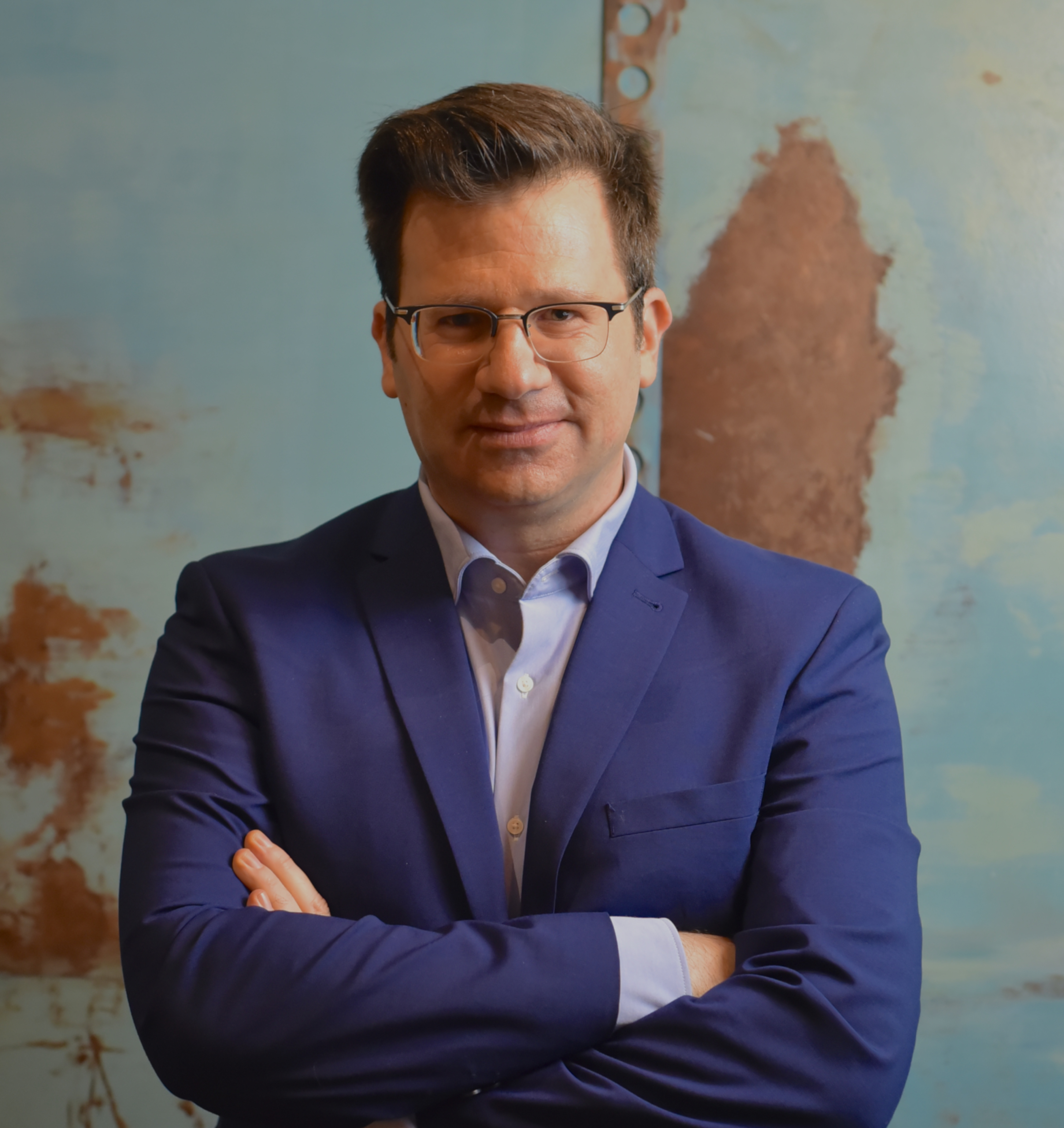
- Born: Montréal, Canada
- Education: University of Guelph; University of Toronto; Mount Sinai School of Medicine
- Occupations: Physician, scientist, author
- Writing career
- Genre: non-fiction
- Notable works: Survival of the Sickest; How Sex Works; Inheritance; The Better Half
- Website: sharonmoalem.com

Sharon Moalem is a Canadian–American physician, scientist, and author. Dr. Moalem is an expert in the fields of rare diseases, sex differentiation, neurogenetics, biotechnology and has been described as a polymath. He is the author of the New York Times bestselling book Survival of the Sickest, as well as How Sex Works, Inheritance and The Better Half. His clinical genetics research led to the discovery of three rare genetic syndromes, hypotrichosis-lymphedema-telangiectasia-renal defect syndrome, a form of SRY-negative XX male sex reversal as well as a nephronopthisis associated ciliopathy. His research led to the discovery of a new class of antibiotics that specifically target superbug microorganisms such as Methicillin-resistant Staphylococcus aureus (MRSA). Moalem was the first to propose that the progressive neurodegeneration associated with dementia and Alzheimer's disease might be caused or exacerbated by an excessive amount of the metal iron in the brain. Moalem has cofounded two biotechnology companies and has been awarded 25 patents for his inventions in biotechnology and human health.

== Career ==
Moalem earned his Doctor of Philosophy in human physiology specializing in neurogenetics from the University of Toronto. He completed his Doctor of Medicine at Mount Sinai School of Medicine in New York City. As a college student, he worked with the king of Thailand, Bhumibol Adulyadej, to help improve the care of young children at an HIV-positive orphanage. In this capacity, Moalem worked in HIV prevention for the Population and Community Development Association (PDA) and was responsible for the operations of the Tarn Nam Jai HIV+ Orphanage in Bangkok, Thailand.

His research in neurogenetics led to the discovery of new genetic associations for familial Alzheimer's disease. He was previously the associate editor of the Journal of Alzheimer's Disease. Moalem was the first to propose that the progressive neurodegeneration associated with dementia and Alzheimer's disease, and the subsequent progression of cognitive decline may be caused by excessive amounts of iron in the brain. Although still a theory, there is growing evidence to support Moalem's hypothesis. Moalem's scientific work, based upon using rare conditions as a template to understand more common conditions, led to the discovery of Siderocillin, a new antibiotic that specifically targets so-called "superbugs" or multiresistant microbes.

Moalem was the lead author on the paper that first described the condition hypotrichosis-lymphedema-telangiectasia-renal defect syndrome (HLTRS) that resulted from a heterozygous mutation in the SOX18 gene. The SOX18 gene has a major role in the formation of blood and lymphatic vessels but prior to the description of HLTRS was not understood to be involved in renal function. His clinical research also led to the description of an SRY negative type of XX male sex reversal that resulted from a duplication of the SOX3 gene found on the X chromosome. The SOX3 gene encodes a protein that is similar but distinct to the testis-determining factor (TDF), also known as sex-determining region Y (SRY) protein that is found on the Y chromosome.

He has founded two biotechnology companies, Sideromics LLC and Recognyz System Technology, founded to develop treatments for the health effects experienced by persons with rare diseases. Moalem has also been awarded 25 patents for inventions related to biotechnology and human health.

In March 2014, Moalem and his team won a hackathon at MIT to build a smartphone app that can be used to treat patients by identifying predispositions to certain diseases based on facial structure.

Moalem has been described as a polymath. He is a frequent keynote speaker on the topics of genetics, human sex differentiation and its medical implications, pandemics, evolution, antimicrobial resistance, iron metabolism, botany, entomology, personalized medicine and has appeared and been interviewed by CNN's Christiane Amanpour, NBC's Today Show, BBC Radio 4, Bloomberg Television, Comedy Central's The Daily Show with Jon Stewart, CBS This Morning, Good Morning America and NPR.

== Books ==
=== Survival of the Sickest: A medical maverick discovers why we need disease ===
Dr. Moalem's first book Survival of the Sickest was published in 2007 by William Morrow (HarperCollins). The book, co-written by Jonathan Prince, lays out eight case studies revolving around the argument that common hereditary diseases exist because at one point they were an adaptive advantage for our ancestors. One proposed hypothesis is that water induced wrinkling of skin is an adaptation to improve traction in wet or slippery environments. Research has subsequently shown this to be likely the case.

The book debuted on the New York Times' bestselling book list in hardcover nonfiction and has been translated into 35 languages.

=== How Sex Works: Why We Look, Smell, Taste, Feel, and Act the Way We Do ===
In April 2009, Dr. Moalem's second book How Sex Works: Why We Look, Smell, Taste, Feel, and Act the Way We Do was published by HarperCollins. The book examines the scientific reasons behind why people are attracted to one another. The topics covered include the evolutionary underpinnings of sexual attraction, monogamy, and sexual orientation.

=== Inheritance: How Our Genes Change Our Lives—And Our Lives Change Our Genes ===
In April 2014, Inheritance was published by Grand Central Publishing. The book, co-written by journalist Matthew D. LaPlante, unpacks emerging research into the flexible genome, which is "mediated and orchestrated by how you live, where you live, the stresses you face, and the things you consume," promising a future in which people will make health decisions not based on what is good for most of the people most of the time, but rather what is genetically best for each individual based on their specific genetic and epigenetic profile. Inheritance was named one of Amazon's Best Science Books of 2014.

=== The Better Half: On the Genetic Superiority of Women ===
The Better Half was published in April 2020 by Farrar, Straus and Giroux and by Allen Lane (an imprint of Penguin Books) in the United Kingdom. Prior to publication, The Better Half was named one of the non-fiction books to look out for in 2020 by the Guardian, Evening Standard and the Sunday Times. In the book Moalem proposes the Law of Homogameity as the explanation for the biological survival advantage which occurs across the tree of life when a species inherits two of the same sex chromosomes. According to Moalem, when applied to humans, the Law of Homogameity predicts that from birth, genetic females possess a survival advantage that results from them being the homogametic sex because they have inherited two X chromosomes, as opposed to genetic males who are the heterogametic sex with one X and Y chromosome. Moalem explains that beyond mere redundancy, genetic females not only have more genetic information than males, but that female cells using different X chromosomes can interact and cooperate, which gives them an advantage throughout the life course and especially in times of famine and pandemics. Moalem's assertion regarding the female survival advantage became apparent during the COVID-19 pandemic, where males were found to have a higher mortality rate reported across many age groups. The book also explicates that female immunological superiority is rooted in their being the homogametic sex as well as being aided by the fact that estrogens are thought to be able to stimulate the immune system, while androgens such as testosterone have been found to suppress the immune system of males. Moalem further provides an explanation for the much higher rate of autoimmune disorders observed in females which he attributes to females having cellular heterogeneity due to their two populations of cells using two different X chromosomes combined with their more robust immune system. In the final chapter of the book, Moalem argues why sex chromosomes matter in medicine as he calls for a long-overdue reconsideration of our male-centric, one-size-fits-all view of the body, a view that even today continues to frame women through the lens of men. The Better Half has been translated into 21 languages and made the PEN/E. O. Wilson Literary Science Writing Award longlist for 2021.
