= The Truth (with Jokes) =

2005 book by Al Franken

The Truth (With Jokes)
- First edition
- Author: Al Franken
- Language: English
- Subject: 2004 U.S. presidential election
- Genre: Political satire
- Publisher: Dutton
- Publication date: 2005
- Publication place: United States
- Media type: Hardcover/paperback
- ISBN: 9780452287679
- OCLC: 84839079
- Dewey Decimal: 973.931
- LC Class: JK526 2004 .F73 2005
- Preceded by: Lies and the Lying Liars Who Tell Them: A Fair and Balanced Look at the Right

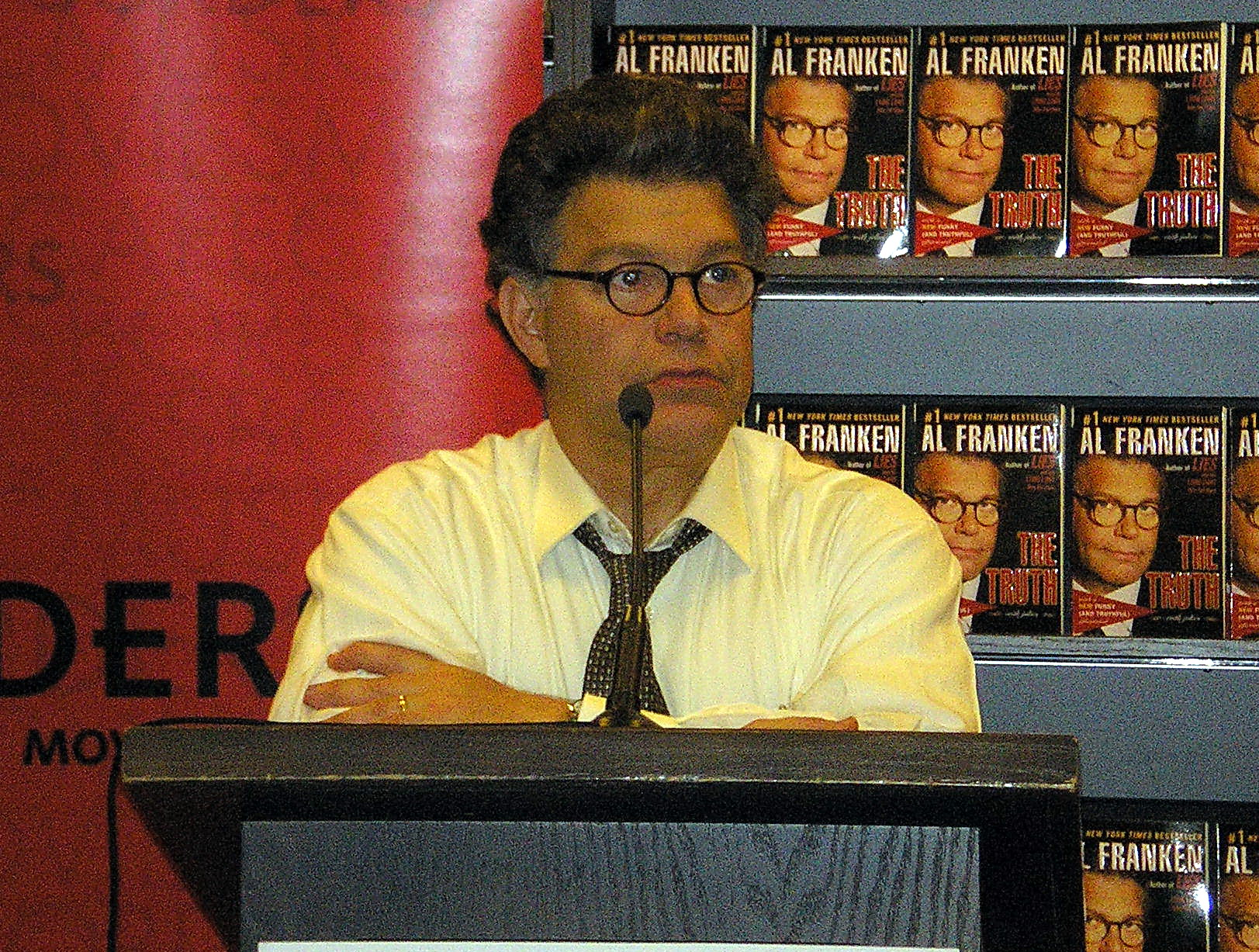
Franken on book tour

The Truth (With Jokes) is an American book of political satire and humor by Al Franken, released in October 2005. The book's main focus is on the 2004 presidential election and Franken's research into the Republicans' strategy in their victory—as well as examples of subsequent political overreach which he predicts will be their downfall. Finally, he makes some predictions.

== Book I: The Triumph of Evil ==
The book opens with a retelling of the aftermath of November 2, 2004, as all the major news stations claim that incumbent U.S. President George W. Bush—reelected with an historically narrow margin over his Democratic opponent, Massachusetts Senator John Kerry, of less than 2.5 percentage points—won an "ideological mandate" in this election. Franken points to the previous low point for incumbent presidents' reelections, Woodrow Wilson's 3.2-point 1916 victory, juxtaposes them with the landslide reelection victories of Franklin D. Roosevelt in 1936, Dwight D. Eisenhower in 1956, Lyndon B. Johnson in 1964, Richard Nixon in 1972, and Ronald Reagan in 1984, and counter-argues that Bush's margin of victory was nowhere close to these lopsided contests; further, Franken points out that Bush's margin was 6 points narrower than that of Bill Clinton in 1996 over Republican challenger Bob Dole, and that nobody considered that victory a "mandate".

Franken then enumerates the reasons he believes Bush won, as summarized in three rhyming words:

- Fear: He used the threat of terrorism to scare voters into believing John Kerry wouldn't be able to protect them;
- Smear: He misrepresented Kerry's record; and
- Queers: He turned gay marriage into a wedge issue.

=== Fear ===
Franken uses several quotes from throughout the 2004 campaign to illustrate the point of "How Bush Won: Fear". In several instances campaigners heavily relied on the events of 9/11 to paint President Bush as a strong military leader and John Kerry as a waffler. Franken counters with direct quotes from the 9/11 Commission that suggest Bush ignored or overlooked several key pieces of intelligence from the CIA that, if acted upon, could have prevented the attacks altogether.

Franken also writes that Bill Clinton received similar intelligence regarding potential attacks on January 1, 2000, and was able to quickly raise the security level and prevent terrorist activity.

He also talks about terror management theory and its relevance to the 2004 campaign, including numerous "conflations" by Republicans, particularly at their national convention, of the Iraq War with the 9/11 terrorist attacks. Almost no mention is made at the 2004 Republican National Convention of Osama bin Laden, whose terrorist group al Qaeda is considered to have perpetrated the events of 9/11; across all the speeches delivered during television prime time, there was only one mention, by then-Governor of New York George Pataki. Meanwhile, the words "terror"/"terrorism"/"terrorist", and mentions of Iraq, Iraqi dictator Saddam Hussein, and 9/11 occurred 178 times in total.

One chapter is devoted to exploring the idea that 9/11 was used, as the wife of blogger Dwight Meredith phrased it, as Bush's "little black dress"—something he could slip on for any occasion, something he could use to justify any action he took.

=== Smear ===
In "How Bush Won: Smear," Franken addresses the accusations of the Swift Boat Veterans for Truth group that alleged during the 2004 election that John Kerry's medals for valor were actually based on an act of cowardice. The incident, involving Kerry's killing of a Viet Cong soldier, was not witnessed by any of the group's members. Moreover, the group dubiously claimed that Kerry shot a potentially unarmed and wounded teenager in the back while he attempted to escape.

Franken surmises, using the testimony of the soldiers who were actually there, that Kerry's original version is the correct version. Franken also quotes a Ted Koppel story from 2004 when Koppel went to Vietnam and spoke personally with the commander of the Vietcong attack, who verified the man killed by Kerry was an adult, and military records that show the man was in possession of a grenade launcher.

The chapter ends with Franken delving into Karl Rove's record of smears. John McCain is mentioned briefly, as the victim of a claim by Rove (during Bush's 2000 search for the Republican presidential nomination) that McCain's adopted Bangladeshi daughter Bridget was actually an illegitimate African-American daughter, a claim which was spread via in infamous push poll. The chapter also contains a detailed account of Alabama Supreme Court justice Mark Kennedy, whose record of advocacy for children was twisted into an accusation of pedophilia.

At this point, Franken writes that he has been hospitalized with "Rove-induced septic shock." The chapter that follows, "A Brief Recuperative Debunk," shifts away from the Bush campaign to debunk a litany of false smears of Kerry consistently repeated by Fox News Channel personality Sean Hannity—to each of which Franken retaliates with an acknowledged-as-false anti-Hannity smear.

The following chapter, "With Friends Like Zell," examines in detail the keynote speech at the 2004 Republican National Convention, delivered by Senator Zell Miller (D–Georgia). In particular, Franken brings to light how the speech misrepresented Kerry's "nay" votes on military budgets as a lack of support of the U.S. military. Franken also talks about how, as recently as March 1, 2001, Miller praised Kerry as one who "has worked to strengthen our military", and contrasts Miller's 2004 keynote convention speech with two other ones: the one he gave at the 1992 Democratic National Convention—in which he denounced Republican politics of "division and diversion"—and with Barack Obama's speech at the 2004 Democratic National Convention.

=== Queers ===
"How Bush Won: Queers" describes ways in which gay marriage was used as a wedge issue to break off certain voters who would have otherwise supported Kerry. It argues that Republicans relied on misrepresenting Kerry's position by saying and implying that he favored gay marriage. Franken lays out John Kerry's exact stance: Kerry supports legally recognized homosexual civil unions, but not full-fledged marriage rights. While Franken disagrees with this view, he says that Kerry has spoken on the record with the same opinion since at least 1996.

Franken shows photos of protesters and pamphlets in red and swing states that say "Support Gay Marriage, Vote John Kerry." Franken implies that these protesters were employed by Republicans trying to sway voters by using the controversial issue of gay marriage.

After summing up how the combined effort of "fear, smears, and queers" won Bush the election, Franken notes the response by the Religious Right, in which they eagerly claimed that his victory was due to their efforts to get out the vote. "They thought the Bible had made them omnipotent. But God had other plans," he concludes—as a segue into the second part of the book, where he talks about subsequent Republican overreach. However, after ending the chapter on this note, Franken takes a break to first write a short chapter about his own religious faith, entitled "Al Franken Talks About God."

== Book II: Seeds of Collapse ==
The second book of The Truth (With Jokes) details various examples of Republican misrule, each chapter being devoted to a different example.

"A Great Political Issue" describes the Terri Schiavo incident, in which Republicans politicized her case—overruling family courts and making dubious claims about her condition—only to offend a large swath of the American public by their intrusion in what even many conservatives saw as a private matter.

"The Tom DeLay Saipan Sex Tour and Jack Abramoff Casino Getaway" describes two primary examples of congressional Republican corruption:

1. First, Franken recounts the findings of a 20/20 episode detailing labor conditions on the island of Saipan in the Marianas Islands. In addition to sub-minimum wages and horrible working conditions, guest workers from China are also forced into performing live sex acts, and forced to have abortions when they become pregnant. Efforts to investigate sweatshops on Saipan are blocked by House Majority Whip Tom DeLay.
2. In the other example, lobbyist Jack Abramoff rips off the Tigua Native American tribe, first by fomenting Religious Right support for shutting down the Speaking Rock casino in El Paso, Texas, a major source of income for the tribe, then by claiming to help them keep their casino open by slipping amendments into bills in the House and Senate to keep the casino open.

"Social Security: Franni vs. Bush" describes Bush's attempt to privatize Social Security. Franken delves into the details as to why Social Security was, as Bush claimed, in financial dire straits, and then debunks all such given reasons. The rest of the chapter describes Bush's attempt to convince the American public to support his plan. It cites a Cato Institute piece, "Achieving a 'Leninist' Strategy", to assert that Bush's strategy for privatizing Social Security was ironically inspired by Russian Soviet Communist leader Vladimir Lenin.

The last three chapters of Book II describe the Iraq War. "Plan of Attack: Attack the Planning" describes the events leading to the war, particularly the Bush administration's refusal to either adequately plan for the war or listen to independent organizations that contradicted the party line that the war would be a quick and easy venture. "Mission Redacted" describes the efforts of corporations and private contractors to profit from the war reconstruction effort. "Werewolves of Washington" touches briefly on the administration's opinion on torture, and the apathy towards the number of people killed, both American troops and Iraqi civilians. It ends with an exhortation to vote out the people responsible in the 2006 elections.

A common thread touched on in the last three chapters is the story of Ahmed Chalabi, who had been hand-picked by Bush's Deputy Secretary of Defense Paul Wolfowitz, to run the new Iraqi regime. His attempt at an anti-Ba'athist uprising failed to gain popular support, and eventually Chalabi decided instead to attempt to gain power as a local warlord.

== Epilogue: The Resurrection of Hope ==
The epilogue takes the form of a letter Franken writes to his grandchildren, dated October 2, 2015. Among the predictions Franken makes (the book was published in 2005) for the coming years:

- Air America, on which Franken was hosting a self-titled talk radio program at the time of writing, has grown from being "just a radio network" to an "international media behemoth". (In reality, Air America, plagued by financial trouble, liquidates in January 2010).
- The Democrats reclaim control of the House of Representatives in the 2006 elections, while the Senate elections that same year end in a 50–50 split. (In reality, the Democrats do take over the House, but also end up with a 51–49 majority in the Senate—including two independents who caucus with the Democrats.)
- Democratic congressional investigations unearth sweeping corruption in Bush's entire cabinet, forcing the ouster of every departmental chief except for Secretary of Transportation Norman Mineta. (In reality, Mineta resigns as Transportation Secretary on July 7, 2006. Several other members of Bush's cabinet at the time the book was published, however, would resign before the end of Bush's term, including Attorney General Alberto Gonzales and Secretary of Defense Donald Rumsfeld.)
- The presidential race in 2008 has unnamed Democrat defeating Senator Bill Frist (R–Tennessee) in a landslide. Karl Rove advises Frist from prison ("Not because of [Valerie] Plame. He punched a cop."). (In reality, Senator Barack Obama (D–Illinois) defeats Senator John McCain (R–Arizona), with 365 electoral votes to McCain's 173.)
- Franken runs for Senate in Minnesota in 2008 and wins. (In reality, Franken does go on to run for Senate against Minnesota's incumbent Republican Norm Coleman, and after a prolonged legal battle and recount process, the election is resolved in Franken's favor on June 30, 2009.)
- George W. Bush is impeached, convicted and begins drinking again "all in the space of a single afternoon," January 18, 2009, two weeks after the new Senators are sworn in and a scant two days before he would have left office under normal circumstances. (In reality, Bush is not impeached, and there have been no prosecutions to date of major members of the Bush administration.)
- Franken mentions working with Congressmen Sherwood Boehlert (R–New York), Jim Leach (R–Iowa), and Senator Ted Kennedy (D–Massachusetts). (In reality, Boehlert does not seek another term in 2006, and Jim Leach is defeated by Democrat Dave Loebsack that year. Franken does serve alongside Kennedy until the latter's death on August 25, 2009, though they do not collaborate on any major bills.)
- Bills to provide universal health care, end dependence on fossil fuels, reform Homeland Security and create a fairer tax code are proposed and passed within the first four days of the new president's term. (In reality, the Patient Protection and Affordable Care Act passes 14 months later, green energy legislation has been stymied, and proposals for tax reform are still being debated.)
- The president is elected to a second term, and then is nominated to the Supreme Court. (In reality, incumbent President Barack Obama wins the 2012 US presidential election, defeating the Republican candidate, former Governor of Massachusetts Mitt Romney, by 332 electoral votes to Romney's 206.)

The paperback edition, released in 2006, features an additional chapter, "You're Welcome," implying that his book had some effect in leading to the conviction of Jack Abramoff. The chapter talks briefly about some of the events that happened since the publishing of the hardcover version, among these Hurricane Katrina, Vice President Dick Cheney shooting Harry Whittington, and the management of American ports by businesses in Dubai.

== Style ==
As the title states and as with his previous work, Franken blends humor with cited fact in an attempt to create a more compelling read.

== Sales ==
The Truth (With Jokes) debuted at #1 on the November 13, 2005 New York Times hardcover nonfiction bestseller list. It remained on the bestseller list for ten weeks. Upon its release in October 2006, the paperback edition appeared at #12 on the paperback nonfiction bestsellers list.
